= Wilmans Peaks =

Mountain in Washington, United States

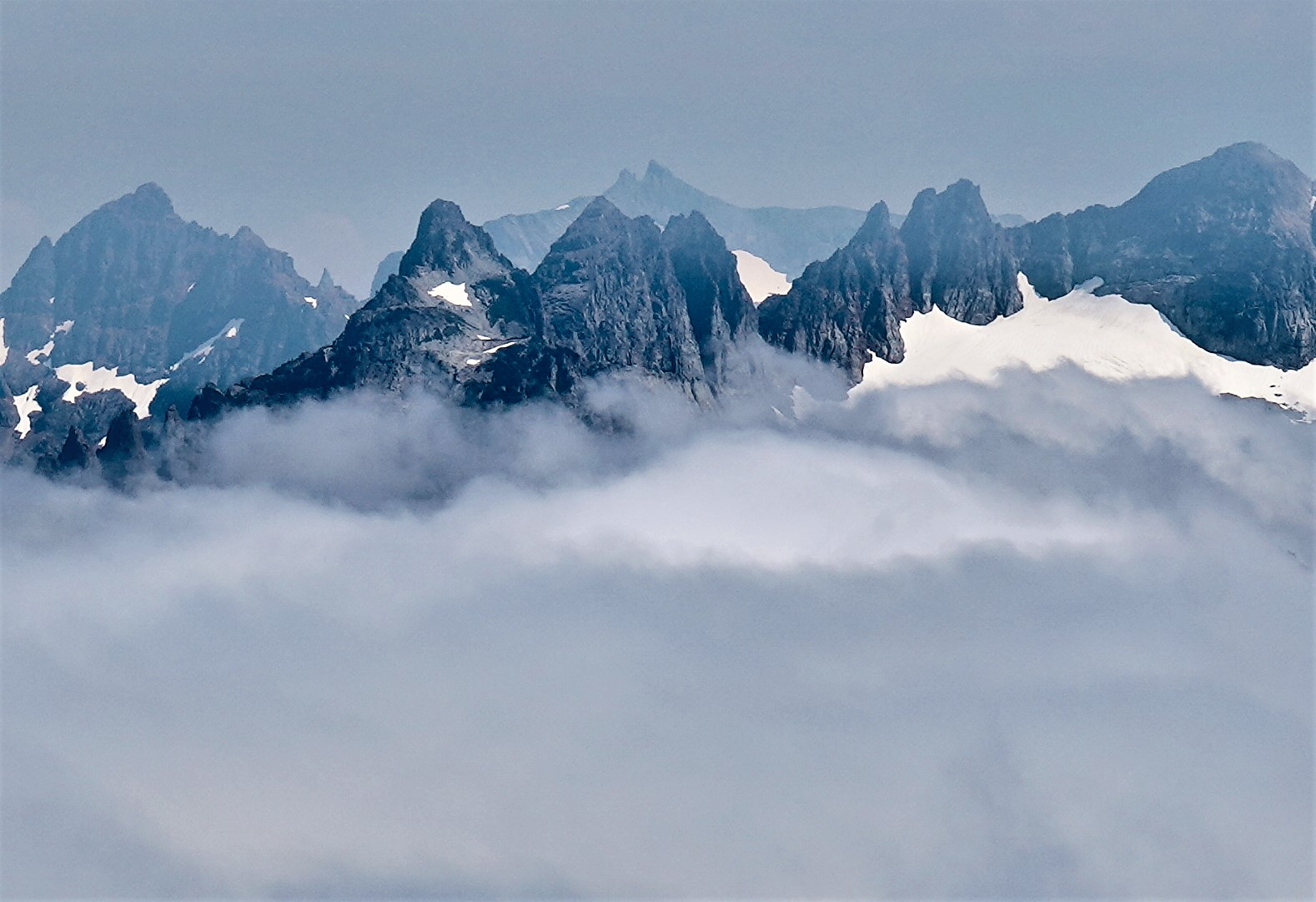
- Northwest aspect

Highest point
- Elevation: 6,880 ft (2,097 m)
- Prominence: 360 ft (110 m)
- Parent peak: Columbia Peak (7,172 ft)
- Isolation: 0.58 mi (0.93 km)
- Coordinates: 47°58′19″N 121°21′54″W

Naming
- Etymology: John McDonald Wilmans

Geography
- Location within Washington (state) Location within the United States
- Interactive map of Wilmans Peaks
- Location: Henry M. Jackson Wilderness
- Country: United States of America
- State: Washington
- County: Snohomish County
- Parent range: Cascade Range
- Topo map: USGS Blanca Lake

Geology
- Rock type: Breccia

Climbing
- First ascent: 1970
- Easiest route: class 4 scrambling

Wilmans Peaks is a 6,880-foot elevation (2,097 m) mountain summit, in Snohomish County of Washington state.

== Description ==
The Wilmans Peaks are located in the North Cascades, six miles southeast of Barlow Pass on the Mountain Loop Highway, and immediately southeast above the historic Monte Cristo area. The mountain is situated within the Henry M. Jackson Wilderness, on land managed by the Mount Baker-Snoqualmie National Forest. Wilmans Peaks has two main peaks and three associated spires. Topographic relief is significant as the summit rises over 4,100 feet (1,200 meters) above Monte Cristo in one mile. Precipitation runoff from the mountain drains into tributaries of the South Fork Sauk River.

== History ==
This landform was originally named Wilmon Peak in 1918, but the toponym was officially revised in 1973 to its present spelling. It was named for John McDonald Wilmans (1858–1916), a Californian who owned one-third interest in the mining claims of the Monte Cristo area around 1890. He also managed and owned controlling interest in the railroad that was built to serve Monte Cristo. The first ascent of the summit was made September 12, 1970, by Dallas Kloke via the northwest ridge and the lower peak was climbed in 1934 by Art Winder and Ben Spellar.

== Climate ==
Wilmans Peaks is located in the marine west coast climate zone of western North America. Most weather fronts originate in the Pacific Ocean, and travel northeast toward the Cascade Mountains. As fronts approach the North Cascades, they are forced upward by the peaks of the Cascade Range (Orographic lift), causing them to drop their moisture in the form of rain or snowfall onto the Cascades. As a result, the west side of the North Cascades experiences high precipitation, especially during the winter months in the form of snowfall, and because of maritime influence, snow tends to be wet and heavy, resulting in high avalanche danger. During winter months, weather is usually cloudy, but, due to high pressure systems over the Pacific Ocean that intensify during summer months, there is often little or no cloud cover during the summer. Due to its temperate climate and proximity to the Pacific Ocean, areas west of the Cascade Crest very rarely experience temperatures below 0 °F (−18 °C) or above 80 °F (27 °C). The months July through September offer favorable weather for viewing or climbing the peaks.

== Geology ==
The North Cascades features some of the most rugged topography in the Cascade Range with craggy peaks, ridges, and deep glacial valleys. Geological events occurring many years ago created the diverse topography and drastic elevation changes over the Cascade Range leading to the various climate differences. These climate differences lead to vegetation variety defining the ecoregions in this area.

The history of the formation of the Cascade Mountains dates back millions of years ago to the late Eocene Epoch. With the North American Plate overriding the Pacific Plate, episodes of volcanic igneous activity persisted. Glacier Peak, a stratovolcano which is 15 mi (24 km) northeast of Wilmans Peaks, began forming in the mid-Pleistocene. In addition, small fragments of the oceanic and continental lithosphere called terranes created the North Cascades about 50 million years ago.

During the Pleistocene period dating back over two million years ago, glaciation advancing and retreating repeatedly scoured the landscape leaving deposits of rock debris. The U-shaped cross sections of the river valleys are a result of recent glaciation. Uplift and faulting in combination with glaciation have been the dominant processes which have created the tall peaks and deep valleys of the North Cascades area.

== See also ==
- Geography of the North Cascades
- Geology of the Pacific Northwest
