= Canyon Falls =

Canyon Falls may refer to:

- Canyon Falls, Kentucky, an unincorporated community in Lee County
- Canyon Falls Bridge, Michigan, in L'Anse Township, Michigan
- Canyon Falls (Washington), on the South Fork Skykomish River
