= Canyon Falls (Washington) =

Waterfall in Washington (state), United States

Coordinates: 47°48′15″N 121°32′09″W

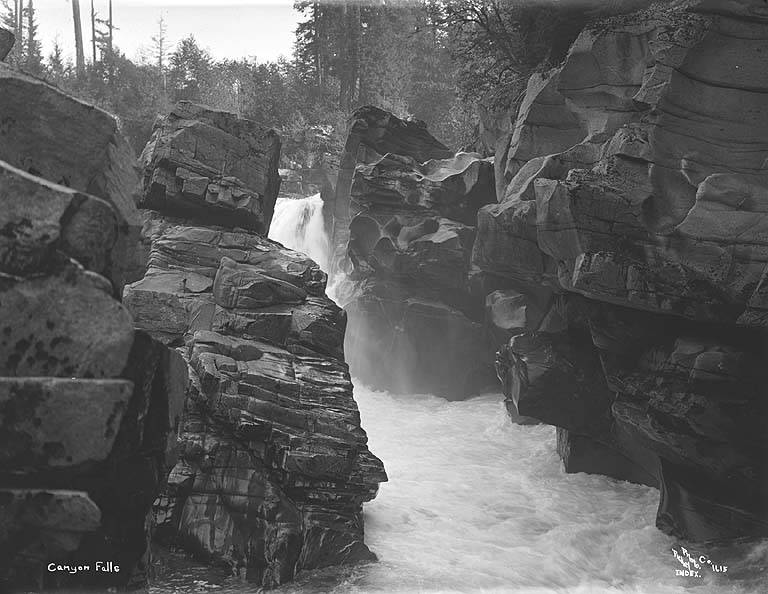
- Interactive map of Canyon Falls
- Location: Between Eagle Falls and Sunset Falls, Snohomish County, Washington
- Type: Tiered
- Total height: 40 ft (12 m)
- Watercourse: South Fork Skykomish River

Canyon Falls is the second of the three waterfalls on the South Fork Skykomish River. The falls occur about halfway between Eagle Falls and Sunset Falls.

The falls drop about 40 feet in three tiers. The first is a powerful 20-foot plunge in which the relatively calm river suddenly attains chaotic state. The next 2 drops are tumultuous cascades. The river is pretty calm both prior to and after dropping over the falls.

== Problems ==
There have been many incidents at Canyon Falls, most of which are deaths that resulted from people being swept over the falls. In the past, numerous people have died because they failed to notice in time that they were approaching the falls simply because the river is so calm above the falls. Many of those deaths were deaths of people who were floating down the river in inner tubes or rafts.

On June 14, 1994, 19-year-old Steven Henderson pleaded guilty of first degree murder back on Feb 1st, when he killed his friend at the falls. The two men had bought beer and headed down to the falls. They soon got drunk and when his friend, Don E. Hood, made a remark about his mother, Henderson lost it. He chucked a football-sized rock at Hood, knocking him out. He then dragged his friend to the edge of the rocks before pushing him into the falls, where he drowned. He was sentenced to 30 years in prison for it.

In the past, there have been disagreements between the people that own the land around and at the falls and the public. The landowners are tired of people trespassing on their land so as a result the land has been posted.
