= Columbia Glacier (Washington) =

Glacier in Washington, United States

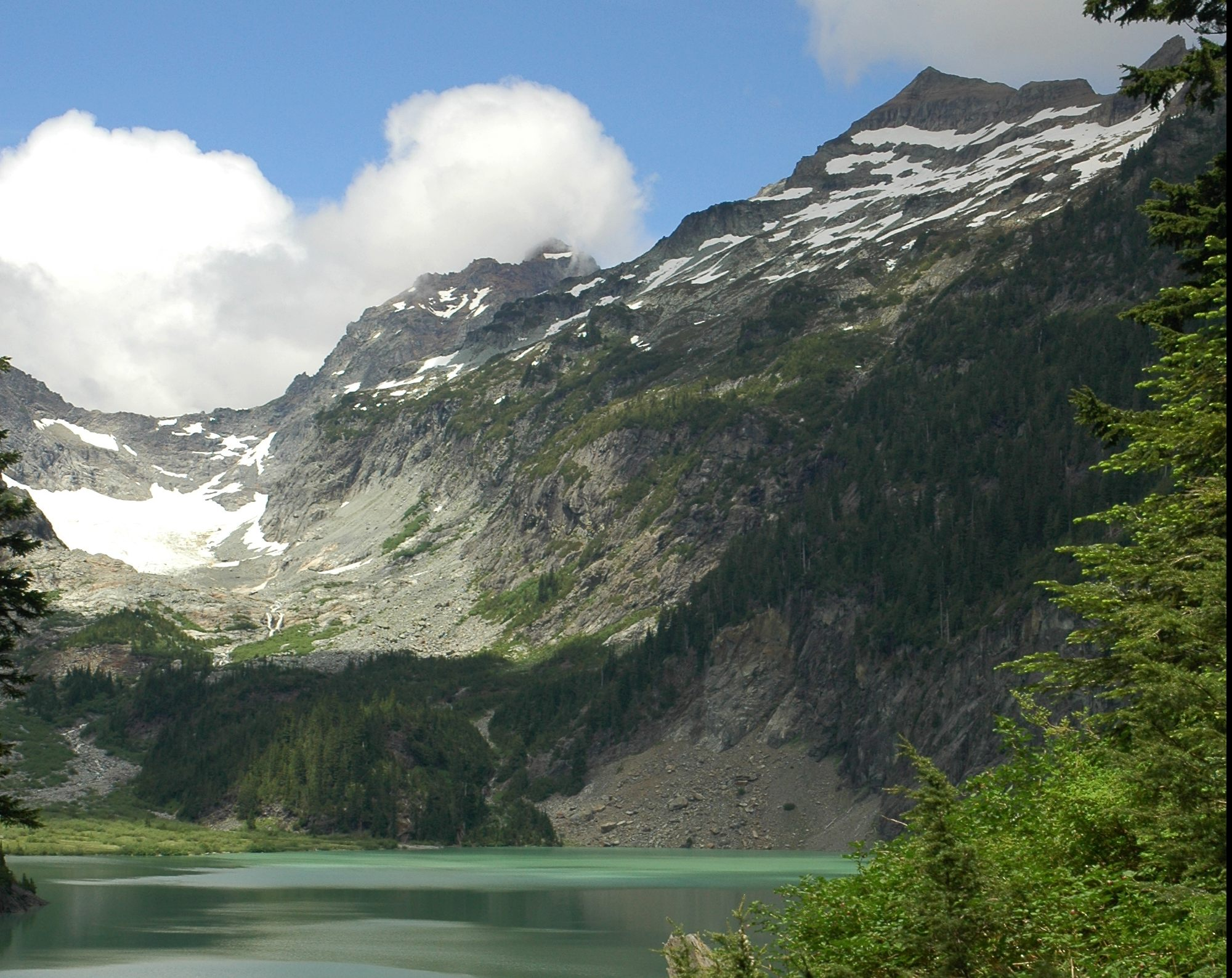
- Columbia Glacier in left background, looking north, in 2005

- Location within Washington (state)
- Interactive map of Columbia Glacier
- Type: Mountain glacier
- Location: Snohomish County, Washington, USA
- Coordinates: 47°57′45″N 121°20′55″W
- Area: .33 sq mi (0.85 km^{2})
- Length: 1 mi (1.6 km)
- Thickness: 246 ft (75 m)
- Terminus: Moraine
- Status: Retreating

Columbia Glacier is a glacier located in the Henry M. Jackson Wilderness in the U.S. state of Washington. It descends from 5,600 ft (1,700 m) to 4,700 ft (1,400 m) above sea level. It is surrounded by Columbia Peak, Monte Cristo Peak, and Kyes Peak and is a source of water for Blanca Lake and Troublesome Creek, a tributary of the North Fork Skykomish River.

The glacier retreated 278 ft (85 m) between 1979 and 2004. The retreat is due to recent reduced winter snowpack and more summer melting leading to negative mass balance. The glacier is in disequilibrium with climate and will continue to thin and retreat.

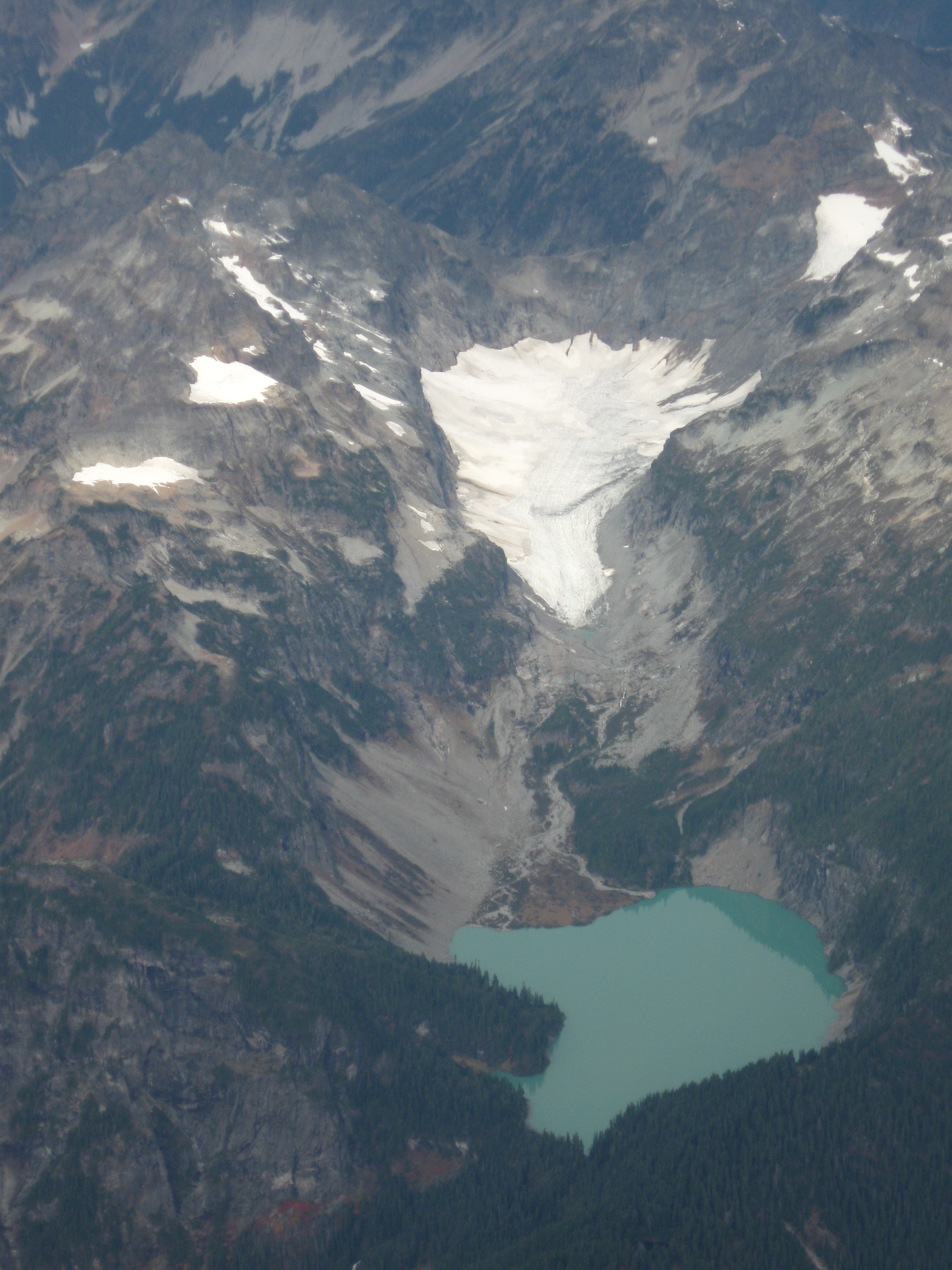
Aerial view of Columbia Glacier in early autumn, 2009

== See also ==
- List of glaciers in the United States
