= Columbia Glacier =

Columbia Glacier may refer to:

- Columbia Glacier (Alaska), a glacier in Alaska, USA
- Columbia Glacier (Washington), a glacier in Washington, USA
- Columbia Icefield, a glacier field in the Canadian Rockies of Alberta and British Columbia, Canada
