= Virgin Lake =

Lake in Washington, U.S.

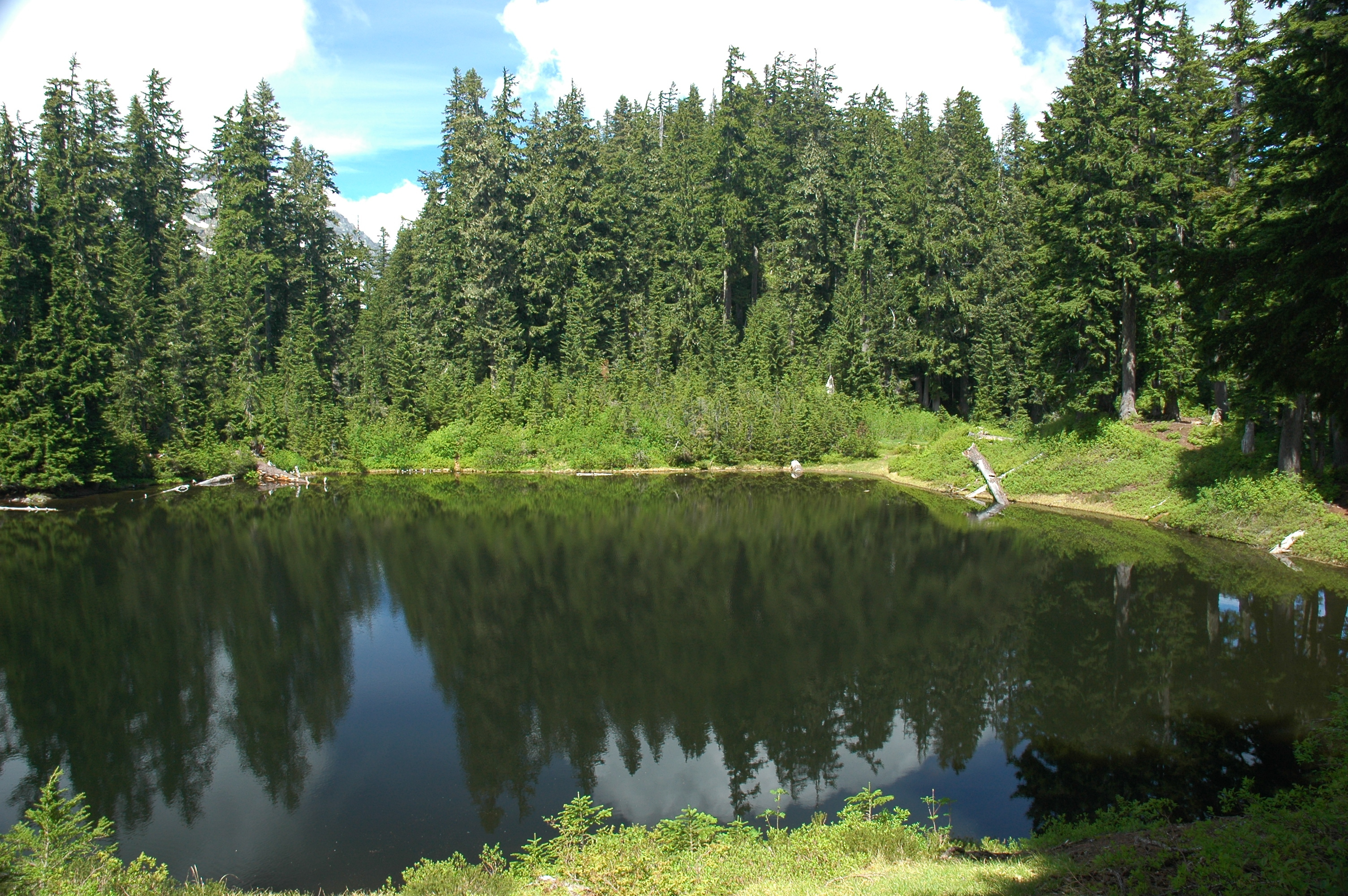
- Virgin Lake 0.5 miles (0.80 km) south of Blanca Lake

- Location within Washington (state) Location within the United States
- Location: Cascade Range, Snohomish County, Washington, U.S.
- Coordinates: 47°55′40″N 121°20′18″W
- Basin countries: United States
- Average depth: 31 feet (9.4 m)
- Surface elevation: 4,577 feet (1,395 m)

Virgin Lake is a small lake with moderately clear water, located at the edge of the Henry M. Jackson Wilderness Area along the Blanca Lake Trail in Washington, United States. The lake is 4,577 ft. (1,395 m) above sea level.

== Fauna ==
The lake contains several species of fish, including muskellunge, panfish, several species of bass, northern pike, and walleye.

== See also ==
- List of lakes in Washington
- List of lakes of the United States
