= Blanca Lake =

Body of water in Washington, USA

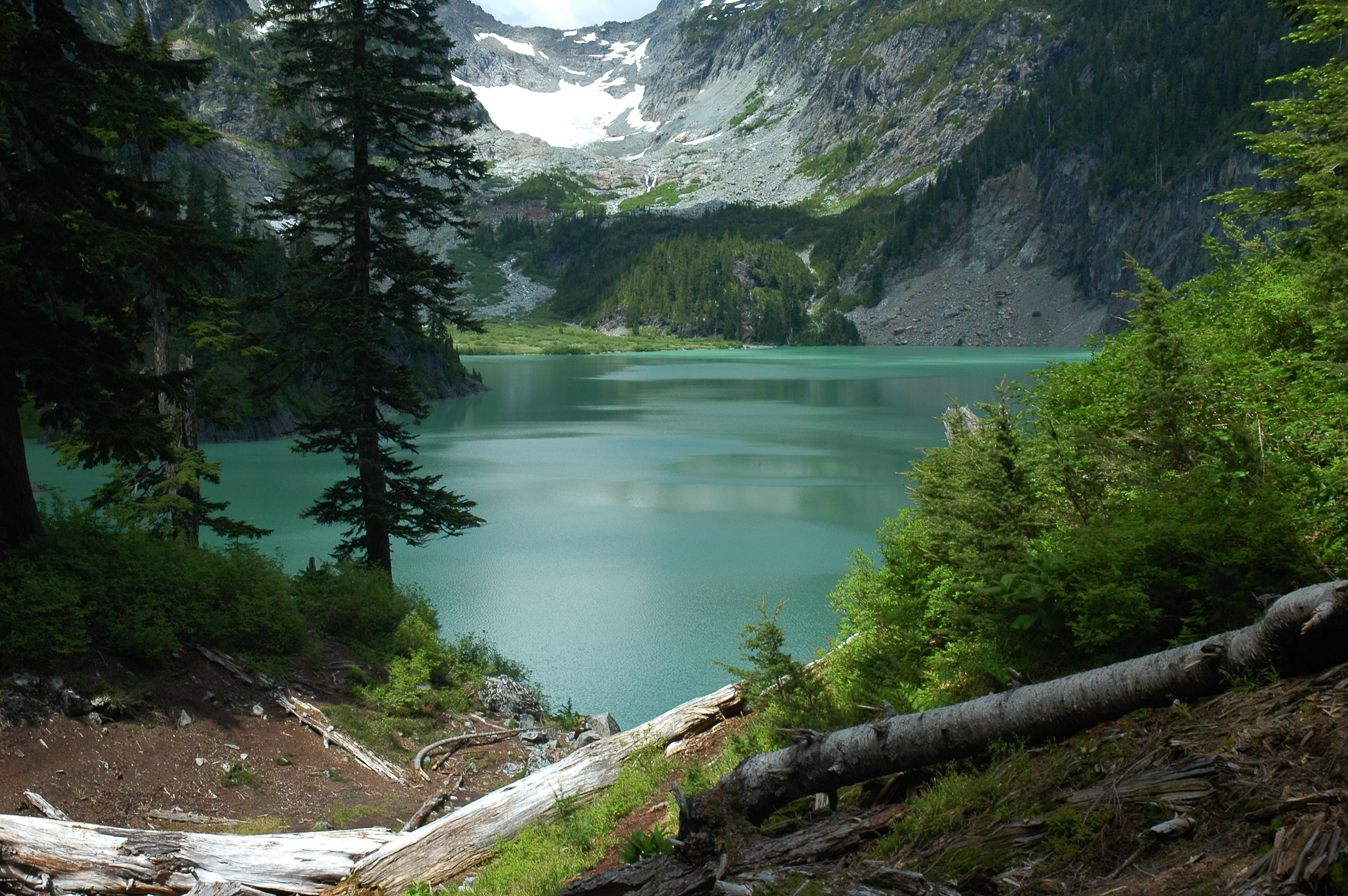
- Blanca Lake with the Columbia Glacier in the background, looking north.

- Location within Washington (state) Location within the United States
- Location: Cascade Range, Snohomish County, Washington
- Coordinates: 47°56′25″N 121°20′24″W
- Primary inflows: Columbia Glacier
- Primary outflows: Troublesome Creek
- Basin countries: United States
- Surface elevation: 3,976 ft (1,212 m)

Blanca Lake is located in the Henry M. Jackson Wilderness Area in the Cascade Mountains of the U.S. state of Washington.

Blanca Lake sits in a basin surrounded by the peaks of Monte Cristo, Kyes, and Columbia. The lake is fed by the Columbia Glacier to the northwest and is drained by Troublesome Creek, a tributary of the North Fork Skykomish River. The glacier's cold, silt-filled melt water is what makes the lake a spectacular turquoise green color making this a prime example of a rock flour lake.

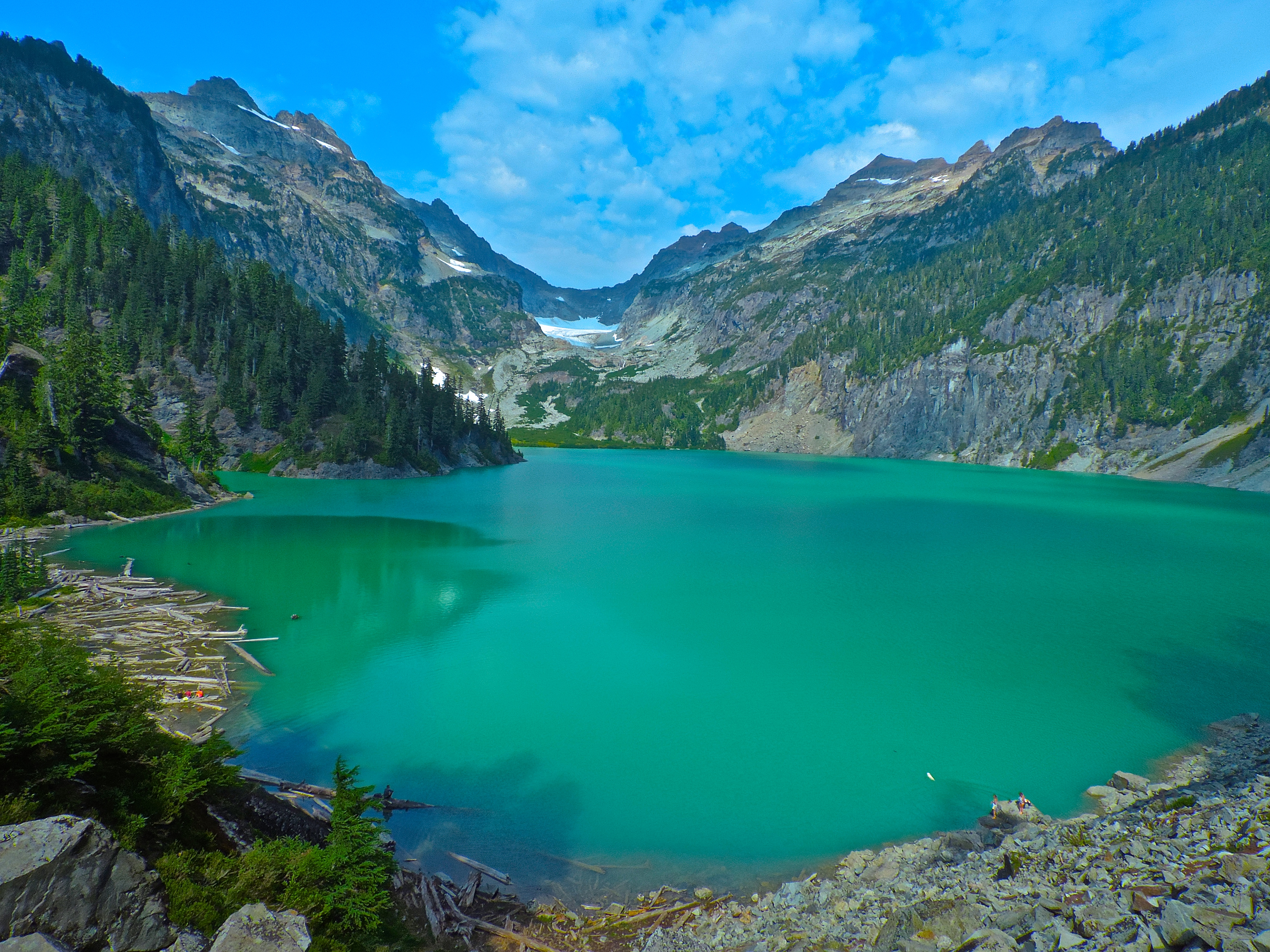
Blanca Lake, Washington, USA

Blanca Lake is accessible only by foot, along the Blanca Lake Trail. The trail begins at 1,900 ft (579 m). The trail climbs quickly from switchback to switchback, gaining 2,700 ft (823 m) elevation over 3 mi (4.8 km), finally arriving at the top of a ridge. From the ridge-top, the trail continues through sub-alpine meadows until you reach Virgin Lake at 4,600 ft (1,402 m). From Virgin Lake, the trail gets rocky, and steeply descends 600 ft (183 m) over 0.5 mi (0.8 km) to Blanca Lake. Due to its elevation, and the heavy snowpack of the Pacific Northwest, Blanca Lake is typically only easily accessible from June until the snows of October or November.

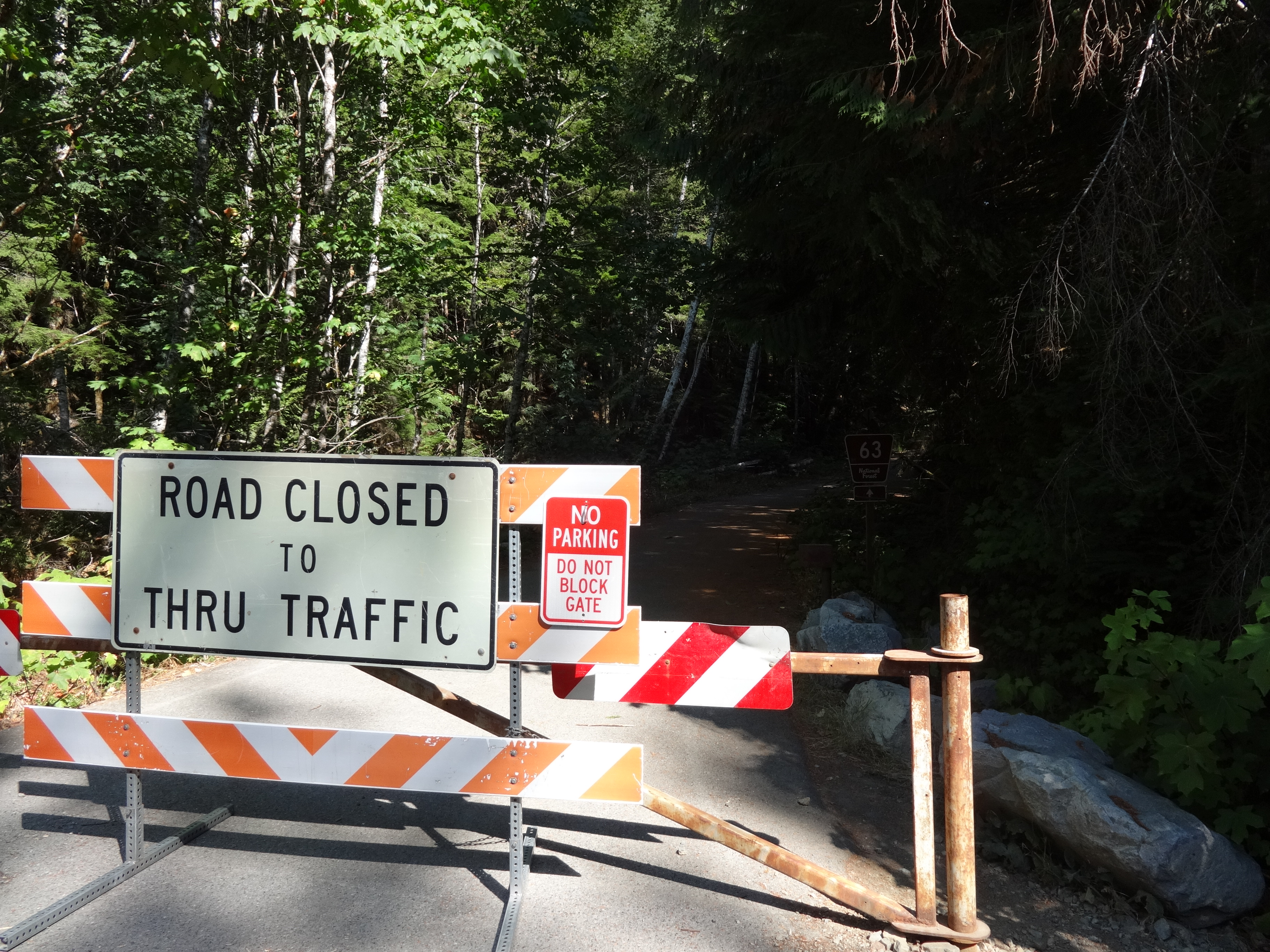
FS63 Road to the Trailhead was inaccessible due to washout in 2017. As of Nov 2019, FS63 is drivable. The parking lot is accessible.

Its beauty makes it a very popular destination for hikers, despite the difficult climb up the mountain trail.

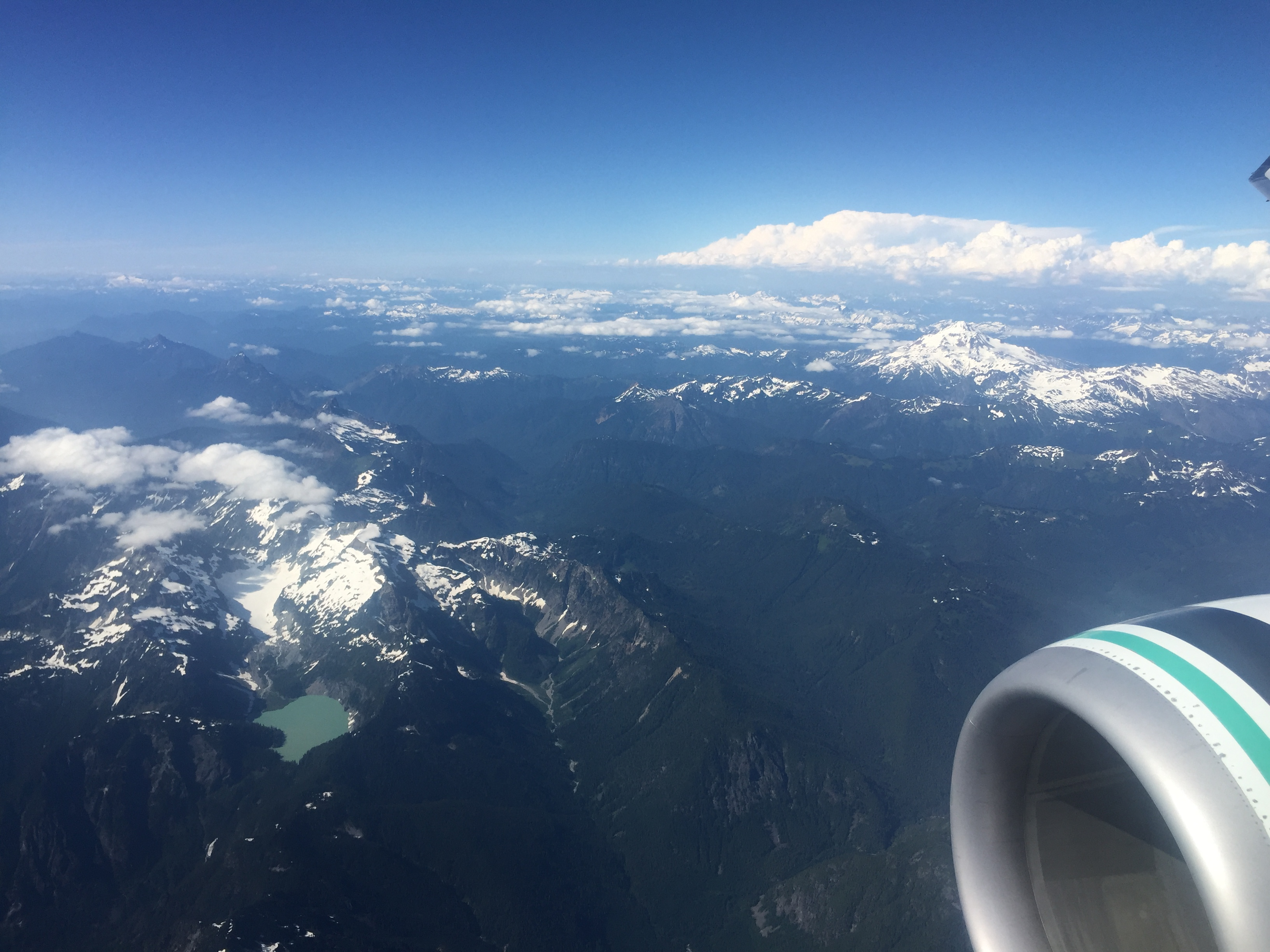
Blanca Lake with Glacier Peak in the distance

To get to the trailhead, take US Forest Road 65/Beckler Road 13.7 mi (22.0 km) near Skykomish, WA to the intersection with US Forest Road 63. Northwest Forest Pass is still required to park and a US Forest Service Daily Fee of $5 per vehicle.
