= Beckler River =

River in the United States of America

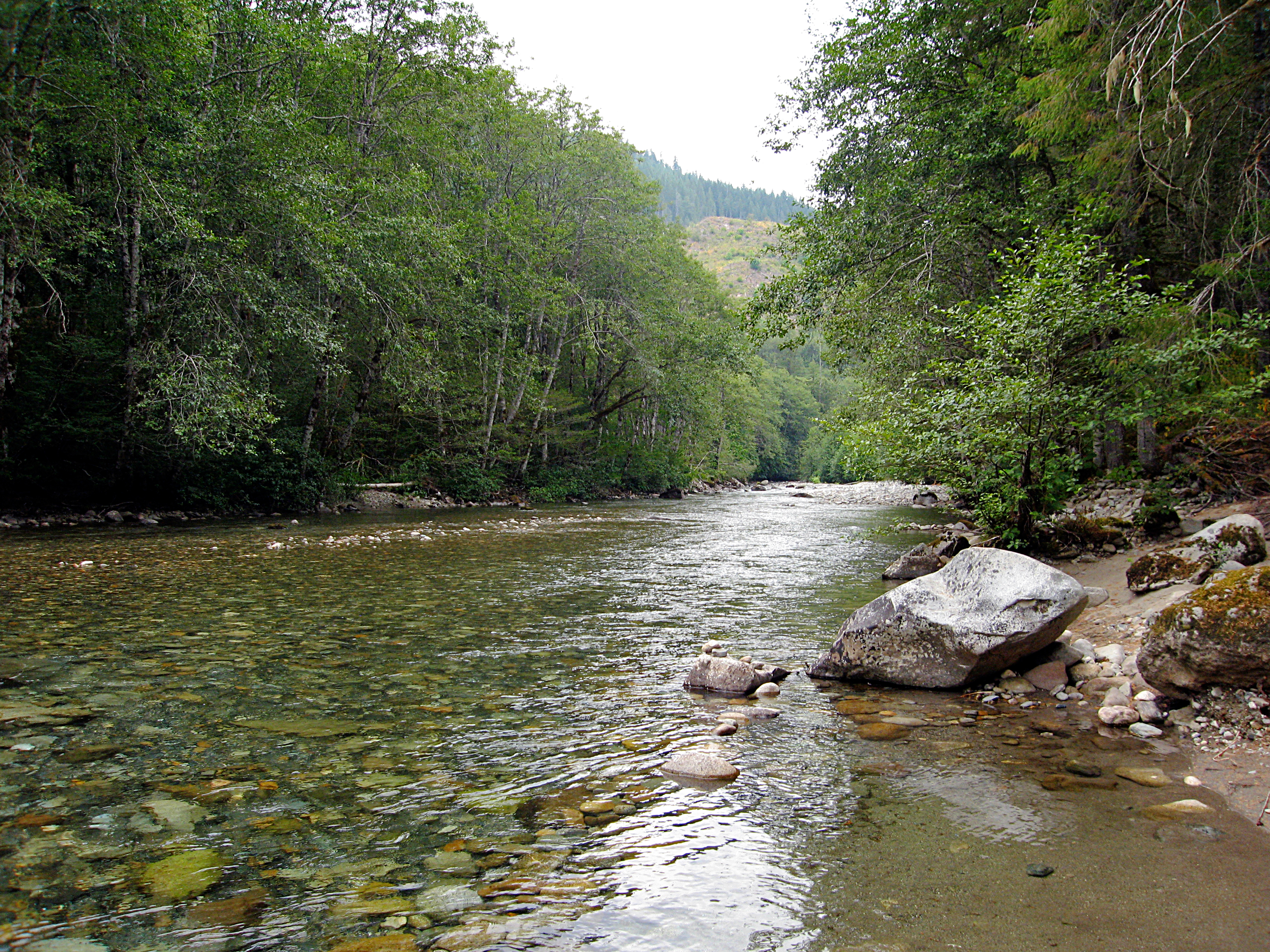
- Beckler River at the Beckler River Campground near Skykomish

- Location of the mouth of the Beckler River in Washington Beckler River (the United States)
- Etymology: Elbridge H. Beckler

Location
- Country: United States
- State: Washington
- Counties: King, Snohomish

Physical characteristics
- Source: Near Jack Pass
  - location: Cascade Range
  - coordinates: 47°52′36″N 121°19′16″W
- Mouth: South Fork Skykomish River
  - coordinates: 47°42′54″N 121°20′21″W
- Length: 13 mi (21 km)
- Basin size: 60 sq mi (160 km^{2})
- Discharge
  - location: near Skykomish
  - average: 605 cu ft/s (17.1 m^{3}/s)
  - minimum: 51 cu ft/s (1.4 m^{3}/s)
  - maximum: 17,100 cu ft/s (480 m^{3}/s)

The Beckler River is a tributary of the South Fork Skykomish River in the U.S. state of Washington in the United States.

The Beckler River originates near Jack Pass and flows southeast about 5 miles (8.0 km) where it is joined by the Rapid River, its principal tributary. The Beckler then flows generally south for about 8 miles (13 km) to empty into the South Fork Skykomish River.

The upper portion of the Beckler River flows through a narrow, steep, and densely forested valley with slopes rising 4,000 feet (1,200 m) and higher over the valley floor. Over its lower course the river valley widens slightly. In its last half-mile the valley opens out into the South Fork Skykomish valley. The only community in the region is Skykomish.

Nearly all the Beckler River's tributaries, with the notable exception of Rapid River, exhibit steep mountain character with numerous cascades and rapids in narrow channels, boulders, and rocky bottoms. The Rapid River is similar in its upper portion, but moderates in its final 3 to 4 miles (4.8 to 6.4 km). Much of the Rapid River's drainage basin has been logged.

Much of the Beckler River's drainage basin is within the Wild Sky Wilderness, although the main river itself is not. The Rapid River's basin is within the Wild Sky Wilderness and the Henry M. Jackson Wilderness. Parts of the main Rapid River itself are in both wildernesses. Both wildernesses are part of Mount Baker-Snoqualmie National Forest. Forest Service Road 65, the Beckler River Road, runs north from U.S. Route 2 following the river to Jack Pass and connecting to Forest Service Road 63, the North Fork Skykomish Road.

== Course ==
The Beckler River originates south of Jack Pass, west of Frog Mountain and east of Bear Mountain, in the central North Cascades. It flows generally south, picking up the tributary Evergreen Creek from the east and passing San Juan Hill on the west. Boulder Creek, flowing from Boulder Lake, joins from the west. Bullbucker Creek joins from the east. A longer tributary, Fourth of July Creek, joins from the west, having comes many miles from Fourth of July Lake near Townsend Mountain and Burley Mountain. Shortly downstream from the Fourth of July confluence the Beckler is joined from the east by its main tributary, the Rapid River. Below that the Beckler River is joined by Johnson Creek then Harlan Creek from the east. The river passes by Eagle Rock to the west and Beckler Peak to the east. Eagle Creek joins from the west. Eagle Creek flows for many miles from its source near Eagle Lake, just upstream from Paradise Meadow. Eagle Lake and Paradise Meadow are separated by a fairly low but rough pass from Barclay Lake, a popular hiking destination near Mount Baring. Below Eagle Creek the Beckler River valley broadens. Beckler River Campground is on the banks of the lower river. Shortly below that the Beckler River empties into the South Fork Skykomish River near the town of Skykomish.

== History ==
The Beckler River is named for Elbridge H. Beckler, who was the chief engineer of the Pacific extension of the Great Northern Railway from 1889 to 1893. Nearby Beckler Peak is also named for him.

In the late 19th and early 20th centuries USGS undertook a massive mapping project in the Cascade Mountains north of Snoqualmie Pass. The Beckler River area was surveyed for this project in 1902 by W.C. Guerin. Prospectors had already thoroughly explored the region by the 1890s. Mineral discoveries prompted booms in the late 19th century, especially at Monte Cristo. The main route to Monte Cristo, before alternate routes were found, was north from Index via the North Fork Skykomish River. The Beckler River offered another route, over Jack Pass to the North Fork Skykomish River. Prospectors explored the Beckler River region during the early 1890s.

== Natural history ==
The Beckler River supports Chinook and coho salmon. Chinook spawning takes places mainly in the Beckler and lower Rapid River. Coho use shallower side channels of the Beckler River and a few small tributaries. Adult salmon benefit from a trap-and-haul operation that transports them over a barrier on the lower South Fork Skykomish River.

== Tributaries ==
From down to upstream, hierarchically listed, not exhaustive:

- Bolt Creek
- Eagle Creek
  - Eagle Lake
- Johnson Creek
  - Bertha Lake
- Rapid River
  - Meadow Creek
  - North Fork Rapid River
- Fourth of July Creek
- Bullbucker Creek
- Boulder Creek
  - Boulder Lake
- Evergreen Creek

== See also ==
- List of rivers of Washington (state)
