= Scorpion Mountain (Washington) =

Mountain in Washington, United States

- Location within Washington (state)

Highest point
- Elevation: 5,535 ft (1,687 m)
- Coordinates: 47°47′31″N 121°11′49″W

Geography
- Country: United States
- State: Washington
- Parent range: Cascade Range
- Topo map: USGS Captain Point

Climbing
- Easiest route: Johnson Ridge Trail

Scorpion Mountain is a mountain in the U.S state of Washington located in Snohomish County near Skykomish.

== Hazards ==
The trail is a ridge trail with steep slopes on either side.

== Recreation ==
The summit affords a 360 degree view of the area, which includes Glacier Peak to the North.

== See also ==
- List of mountain peaks of North America
- List of mountain peaks of the United States
- Beckler Peak
