= Kyes Peak =

Mountain in Washington (state), United States

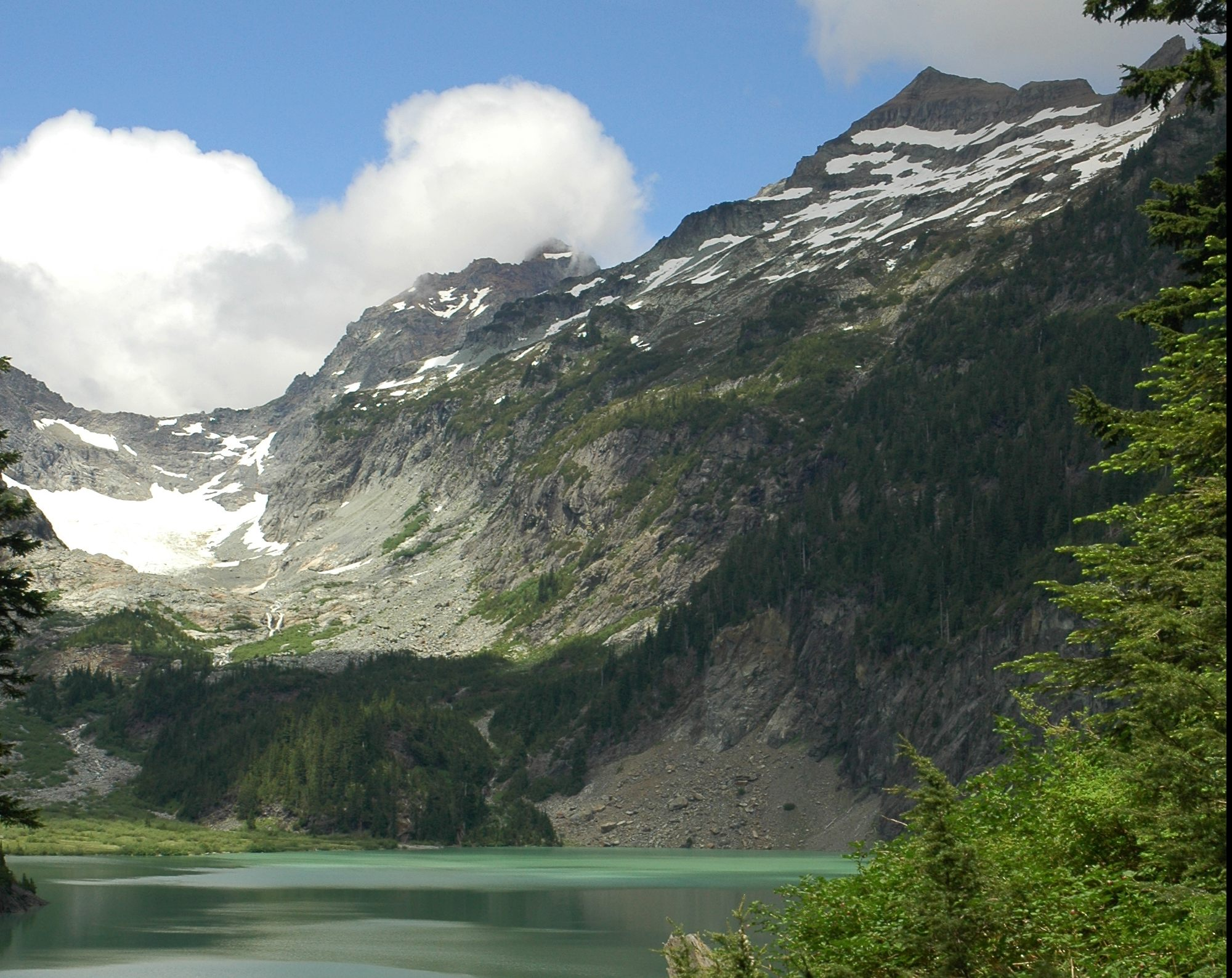
- Blanca Lake with Columbia Glacier in the left background, Monte Cristo Peak in the middle background, and Kyes Peak in the right background, looking North.

Highest point
- Elevation: 7,280+ ft (2,220+ m) NGVD 29
- Prominence: 1,720 ft (520 m)
- Coordinates: 47°57′52.8″N 121°19′59.9″W

Geography
- Location within Washington (state)
- Location: Snohomish County, Washington, U.S.
- Parent range: Cascade Range
- Topo map: United States Geological Survey Blanca Lake

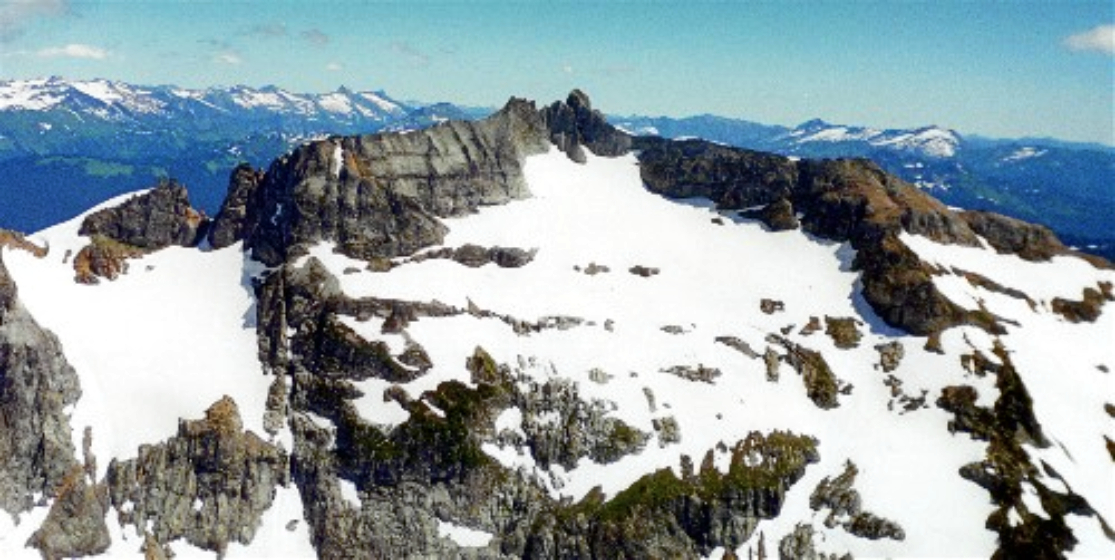
Kyes Peak seen from Columbia Peak

Kyes Peak, which is also known as "Goblin Peak", is a mountain peak located in the Henry M. Jackson Wilderness in Washington, United States. Kyes Peak rises to over 7,280 feet (2,220 m). Together with Columbia Peak and Monte Cristo Peak it forms a basin that contains Columbia Glacier and Blanca Lake. It is the highest summit in the Monte Cristo group of peaks.

Kyes Peak was once mapped as Goblin Peak, and in earlier times was known by miners and the United States Forest Service as Mount Michigan. The name Kyes comes from a member of the first climbing party, Commander James Ellsworth Kyes. Along with Reginald Bachelder, Kyes climbed the mountain on August 15, 1920. Both were members of the Everett Boy Scouts at the time.

It is uncommon for a Washington Cascades mountain to be named after a person who climbed it. The USGS agreed to posthumously rename the mountain in recognition for Kyes' sacrifice commanding a destroyer in the Battle of the Atlantic. An earlier ascent of the peak was probably made by Thomas Gerdine of the USGS in 1897.

== Climate ==
Kyes Peak is located in the marine west coast climate zone of western North America. Most weather fronts originate in the Pacific Ocean, and travel northeast toward the Cascade Mountains. As fronts approach the North Cascades, they are forced upward by the peaks of the Cascade Range, causing them to drop their moisture in the form of rain or snowfall onto the Cascades (Orographic lift). As a result, the west side of the North Cascades experiences high precipitation, especially during the winter months in the form of snowfall. During winter months, weather is usually cloudy, but, due to high pressure systems over the Pacific Ocean that intensify during summer months, there is often little or no cloud cover during the summer. Because of maritime influence, snow tends to be wet and heavy, resulting in high avalanche danger.

== Geology ==
The North Cascades features some of the most rugged topography in the Cascade Range with craggy peaks, spires, ridges, and deep glacial valleys. Geological events occurring many years ago created the diverse topography and drastic elevation changes over the Cascade Range leading to the various climate differences.

The history of the formation of the Cascade Mountains dates back millions of years ago to the late Eocene Epoch. With the North American Plate overriding the Pacific Plate, episodes of volcanic igneous activity persisted. In addition, small fragments of the oceanic and continental lithosphere called terranes created the North Cascades about 50 million years ago.

During the Pleistocene period dating back over two million years ago, glaciation advancing and retreating repeatedly scoured the landscape leaving deposits of rock debris. The U-shaped cross section of the river valleys is a result of recent glaciation. Uplift and faulting in combination with glaciation have been the dominant processes which have created the tall peaks and deep valleys of the North Cascades area.

== See also ==
- List of mountains of the United States
