= Skykomish Peak =

Mountain in Washington (state), United States

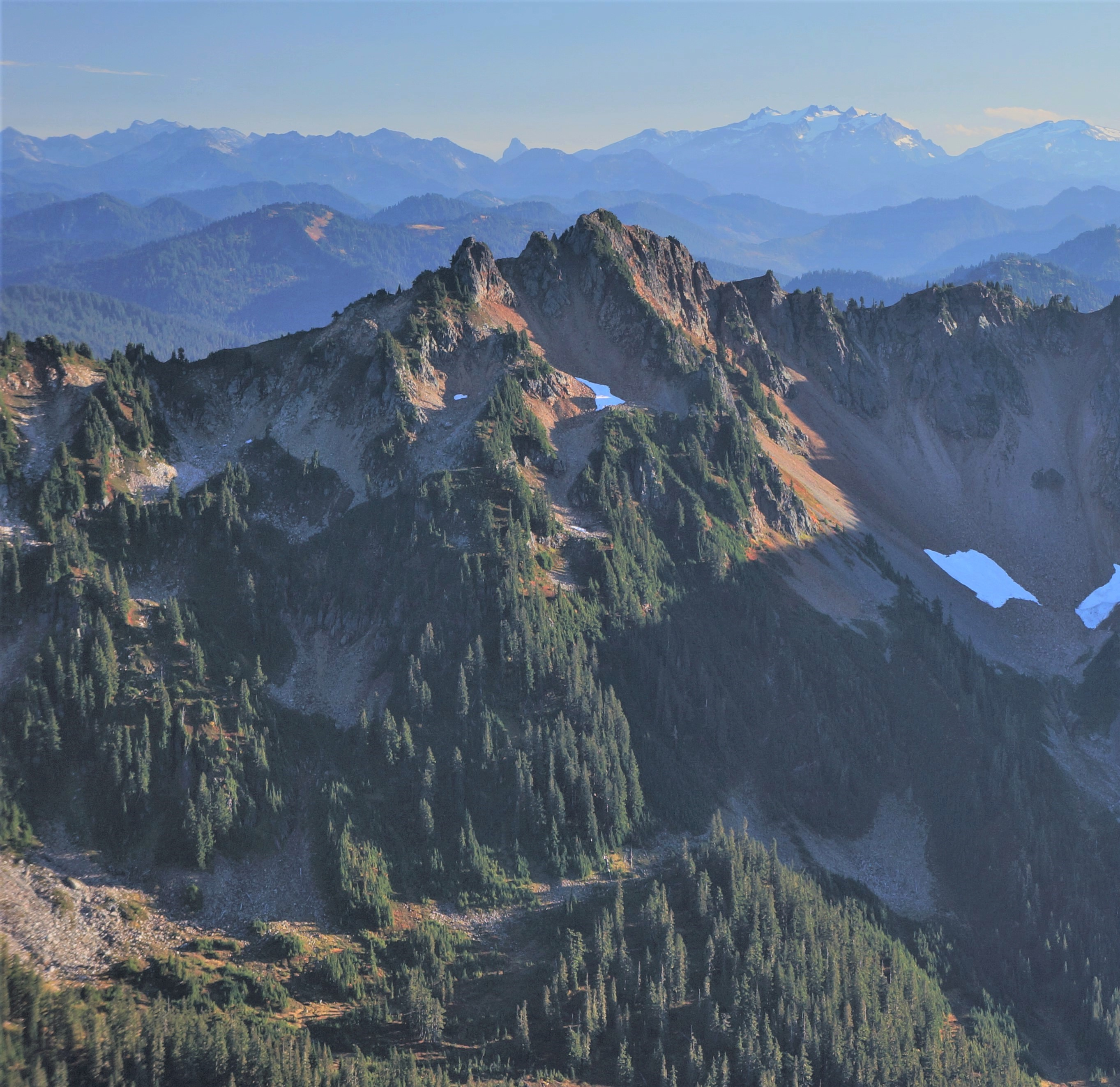
- Skykomish Peak, north aspect

Highest point
- Elevation: 6,368 ft (1,941 m)
- Prominence: 768 ft (234 m)
- Parent peak: Johnson Mountain (6,721 ft)
- Isolation: 2.03 mi (3.27 km)
- Coordinates: 47°57′25″N 121°09′52″W

Geography
- Location within Washington (state) Location within the United States
- Country: United States
- State: Washington
- County: Snohomish / Chelan
- Protected area: Henry M. Jackson Wilderness
- Parent range: North Cascades; Cascade Range
- Topo map: USGS Benchmark Mountain

Geology
- Rock age: Late Cretaceous
- Rock type: Migmatitic Gneiss

Climbing
- Easiest route: class 2 Hiking Southeast Ridge

Skykomish Peak is a 6,368-foot (1,941-metre) mountain summit located in the Henry M. Jackson Wilderness in the North Cascades of Washington state. The mountain is situated on the crest of the Cascade Range, on the shared border of Snohomish County with Chelan County, and also straddling the boundary between Mount Baker-Snoqualmie National Forest and Okanogan-Wenatchee National Forest. Skykomish Peak is located 15 mi (24 km) to the north of Stevens Pass, and the Pacific Crest Trail traverses the east slope of this peak. Precipitation runoff from the peak drains west into the Skykomish River, or east into Cady Creek which is a tributary of Little Wenatchee River. This mountain's name derives from its position at the head of the North Fork Skykomish River, and "Skykomish" comes from the Lushootseed word for the Skykomish people, sq̓ixʷəbš, meaning "upriver people".

== Geology ==
The North Cascades feature some of the most rugged topography in the Cascade Range with craggy peaks, spires, ridges, and deep glacial valleys. Geological events occurring many years ago created the diverse topography and drastic elevation changes over the Cascade Range leading to various climate differences.

The history of the formation of the Cascade Mountains dates back millions of years ago to the late Eocene Epoch. With the North American Plate overriding the Pacific Plate, episodes of volcanic igneous activity persisted. Glacier Peak, a stratovolcano that is 11 mi (18 km) north-northeast of Skykomish Peak, began forming in the mid-Pleistocene. Due to Glacier Peak's proximity to Skykomish Peak, volcanic ash is common in the area and provides fertile soil for an abundance of wildflowers in its meadow-covered slopes.

During the Pleistocene period dating back over two million years ago, glaciation advancing and retreating repeatedly scoured the landscape leaving deposits of rock debris. The U-shaped cross section of the river valleys is a result of recent glaciation. Uplift and faulting in combination with glaciation have been the dominant processes which have created the tall peaks and deep valleys of the North Cascades area.

== Climate ==
Skykomish Peak is located in the marine west coast climate zone of western North America. Most weather fronts originating in the Pacific Ocean travel northeast toward the Cascade Mountains. As fronts approach the North Cascades, they are forced upward by the peaks of the Cascade Range (orographic lift), causing them to drop their moisture in the form of rain or snowfall onto the Cascades. As a result, the west side of the North Cascades experiences high precipitation, especially during the winter months in the form of snowfall. Because of maritime influence, snow tends to be wet and heavy, resulting in high avalanche danger. During winter months, weather is usually cloudy, but due to high pressure systems over the Pacific Ocean that intensify during summer months, there is often little or no cloud cover during the summer. Due to its temperate climate and proximity to the Pacific Ocean, areas west of the Cascade Crest very rarely experience temperatures below 0 °F (−18 °C) or above 80 °F (27 °C). The months of July through September offer the most favorable weather for viewing or climbing this peak.

== Gallery ==
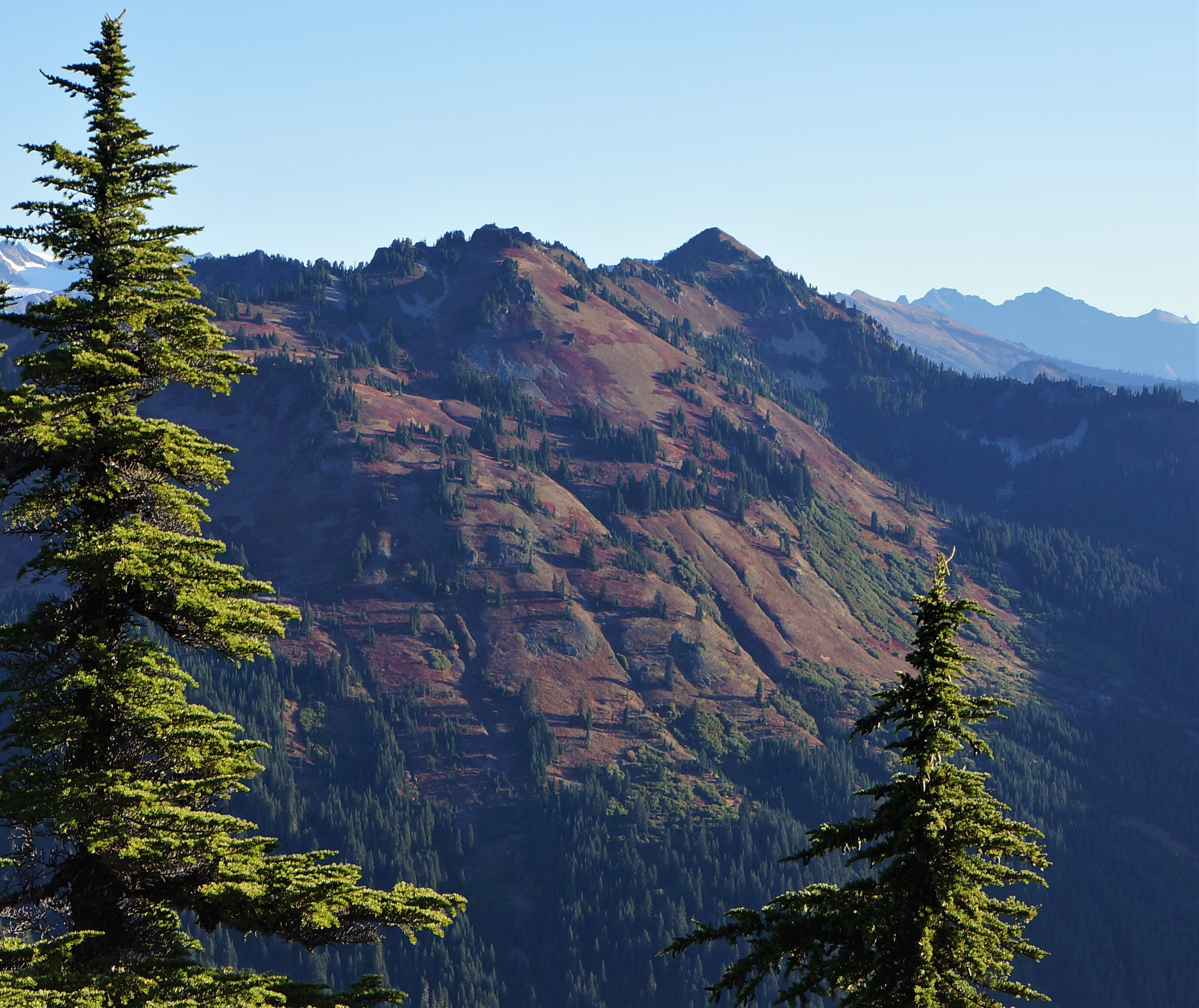
West aspect

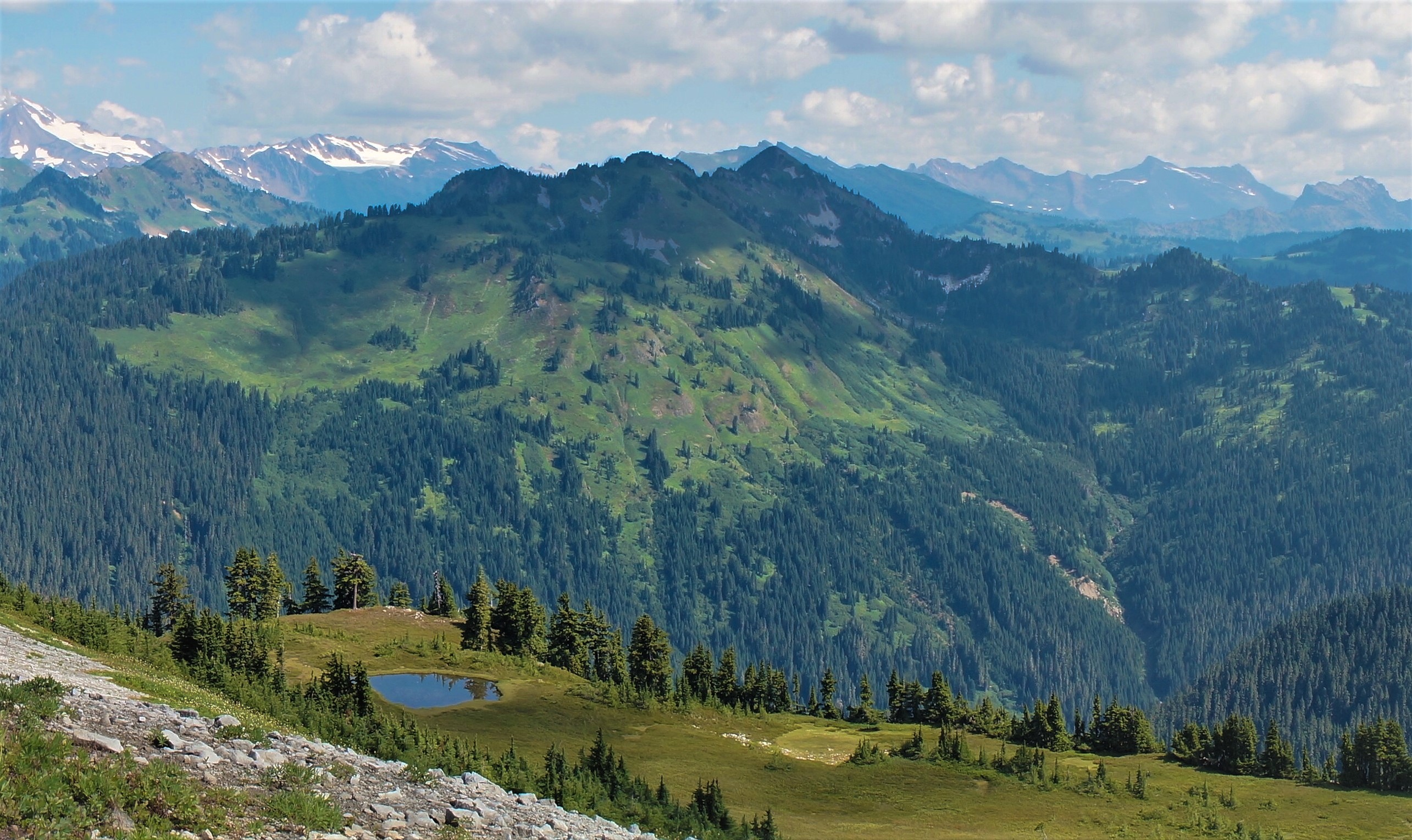
Skykomish Peak from southwest

== See also ==
- Geography of the North Cascades
