= Deer Falls =

Waterfall in Washington (state), United States

Coordinates: 47°55′17″N 121°17′52″W

- Interactive map of Deer Falls
- Location: Snohomish County, Washington, U.S.
- Type: Horsetail
- Total height: 90 ft (27 m)
- Number of drops: 1
- Average width: 25 ft (7.6 m)
- Watercourse: North Fork Skykomish River

Deer Falls is the uppermost waterfall on the North Fork Skykomish River. The falls occur within a short but impressive canyon just above the mouth of Goblin Creek.

The falls are the second largest waterfall on either of the river's two forks, the largest on the North Fork and is said to be the best on either fork. At this point the river hurtles 90 feet (27 m) in one drop into a deep, blue pool.

== Access ==
Access to Deer Falls is anything but easy to access. The falls do lie in the vicinity of a major road; however, are about 300 feet (91 m) below it. You have to climb down about 100–150 feet from the road to the canyon edge. From this point, you can see the falls but at the same time you are sitting 150-200 above the raging North Fork.
