= Sunset Falls =

Waterfall in Washington (state), United States

Coordinates: 47°48′14″N 121°32′59″W

- Interactive map of Sunset Falls
- Location: Near Index, Snohomish County, Washington
- Type: Slide
- Total height: 104 ft (32 m)
- Number of drops: 1
- Average width: 40 ft (12 m)
- Run: 275 ft (91 m)
- Watercourse: South Fork Skykomish River

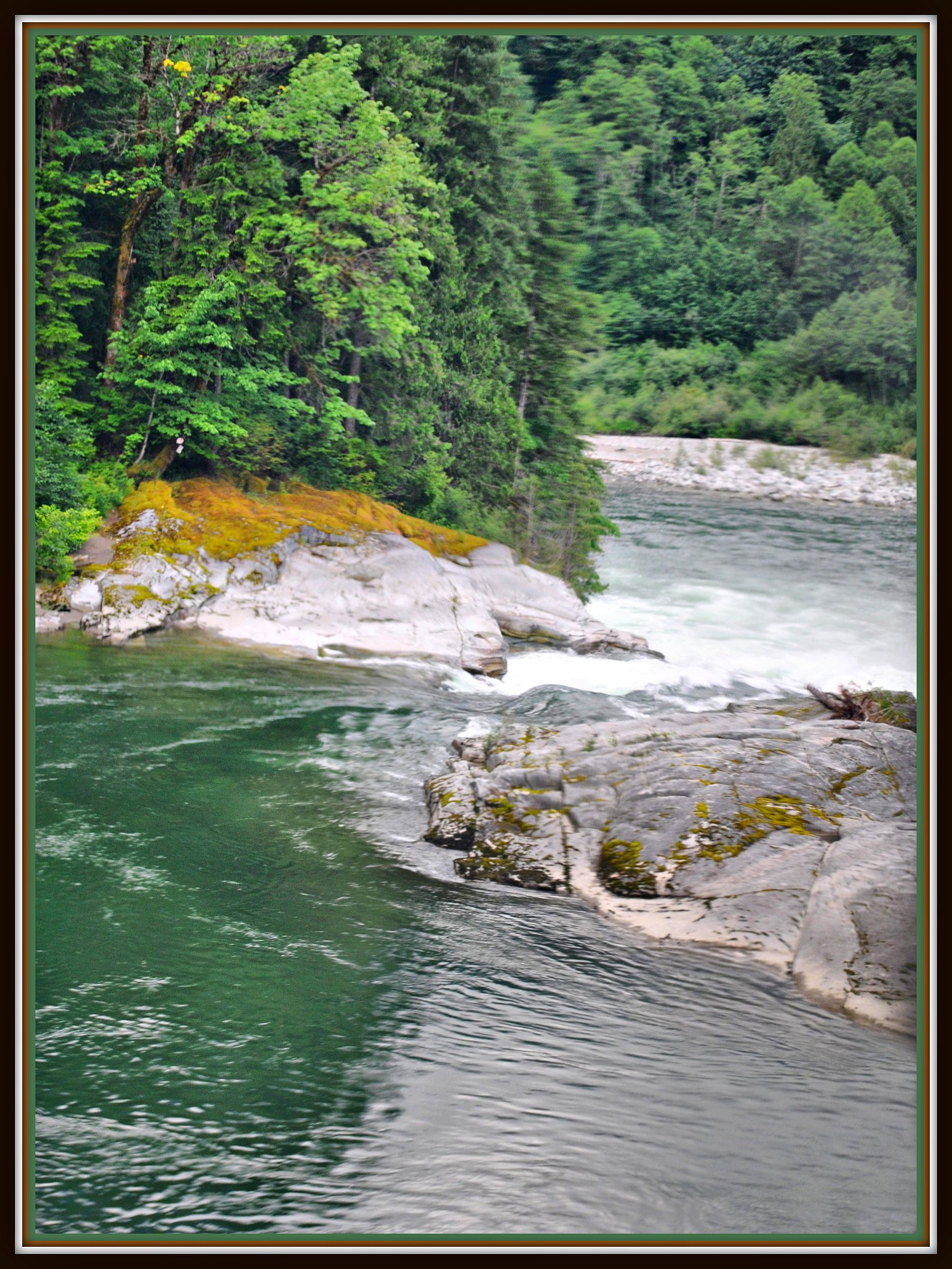
Sunset Falls, Washington From "Amtrak Empire Builder" - panoramio

Rescue boat descending down Sunset Falls during high flow.

Sunset Falls is the final of the three waterfalls on the South Fork Skykomish River. The falls drop 104 feet (32 m) in a long, narrow, powerful chute. The river is thought to attain speeds of 60 kilometres (37 mi) an hour and the chute is nearly 300 feet (91 m) long. In high water, because of several potholes in the falls, water can sometimes shoot out as much as 30 feet.

== Access ==
There is currently no public access to Sunset Falls.

== Running of Sunset Falls ==
On May 30, 1926, daredevil stunt performer Al Faussett ran the falls in a canoe with hundreds of people watching from the rocks beside the falls. He escaped with only brief and minor inner pains. He later went on to run Eagle Falls as well as many other falls in Oregon and Idaho.

Several local kayakers, most notably Rob McKibbin and Sam Grafton have run Sunset Falls successfully. It is considered a class 6 rapid, with unavoidable and potentially deadly hazards.
