= Bear Creek Falls =

Waterfall in Washington (state), United States

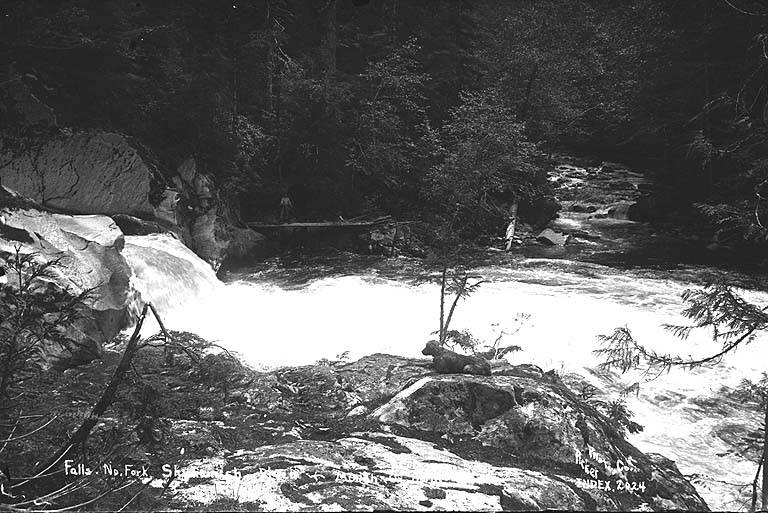
- Interactive map of Bear Creek Falls
- Location: Upstream of Bear Creek
- Coordinates: 47°53′32″N 121°22′57″W
- Type: Tiered
- Total height: 25 ft (7.6 m)
- Watercourse: North Fork Skykomish River

Bear Creek Falls is the final of the two waterfalls on the North Fork Skykomish River in the U.S. state of Washington. The falls are located within a short, narrow canyon.

The falls, at just 25 feet high, are quite insignificant, however are quite significant in terms of how much water is flowing over them. They drop about 8 meters in a series of cascades and punchbowls. Because the gorge is rather twisted, it is hard to see portions of the falls, let alone photograph them.
