= Skykomish River =

River in northwest Washington, United States

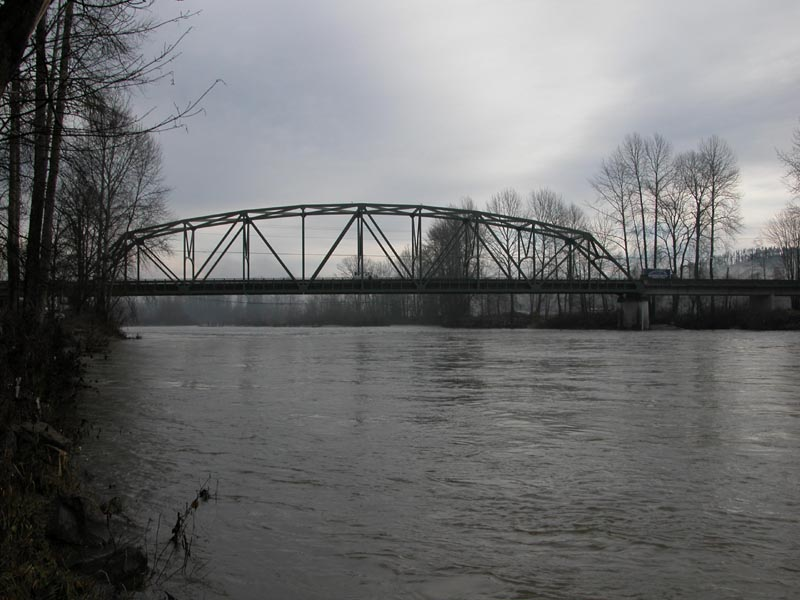
- Skykomish River at Monroe, near flood stage

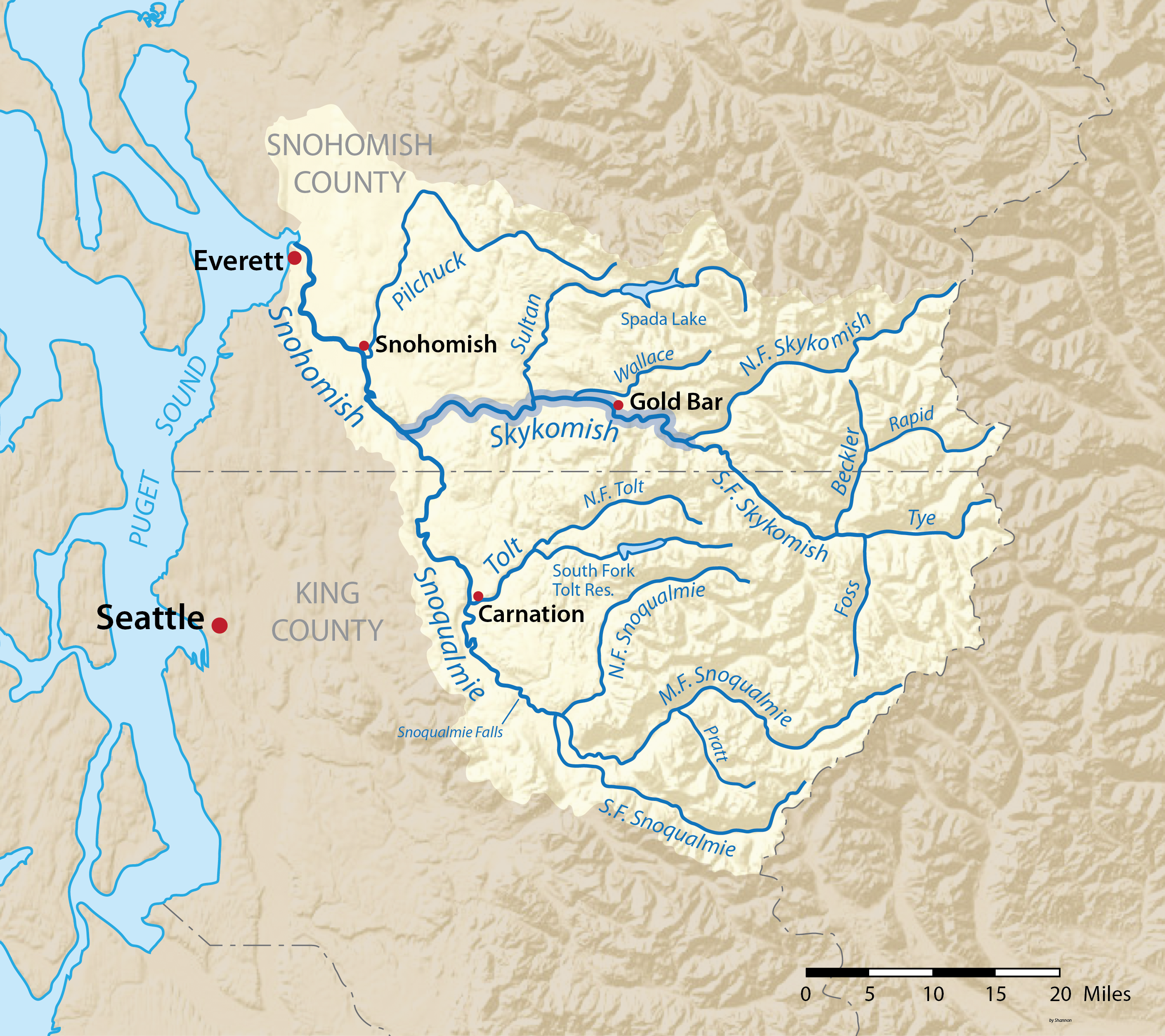
- Map of the Skykomish River highlighted in the Snohomish River watershed

- Mouth of the Skykomish River in Washington Skykomish River (the United States)

Location
- Country: United States
- State: Washington
- County: Snohomish County, King County

Physical characteristics
- Source: Confluence of the North and South Forks
  - coordinates: 47°48′47″N 121°34′41″W
- Mouth: Snohomish River
  - location: Monroe
  - coordinates: 47°49′49″N 122°2′48″W
- Length: 29 mi (47 km)
- Basin size: 834 sq mi (2,160 km^{2})
- Discharge
  - location: Gold Bar
  - average: 3,973 cu ft/s (112.5 m^{3}/s)
  - minimum: 298 cu ft/s (8.4 m^{3}/s)
  - maximum: 129,000 cu ft/s (3,700 m^{3}/s)

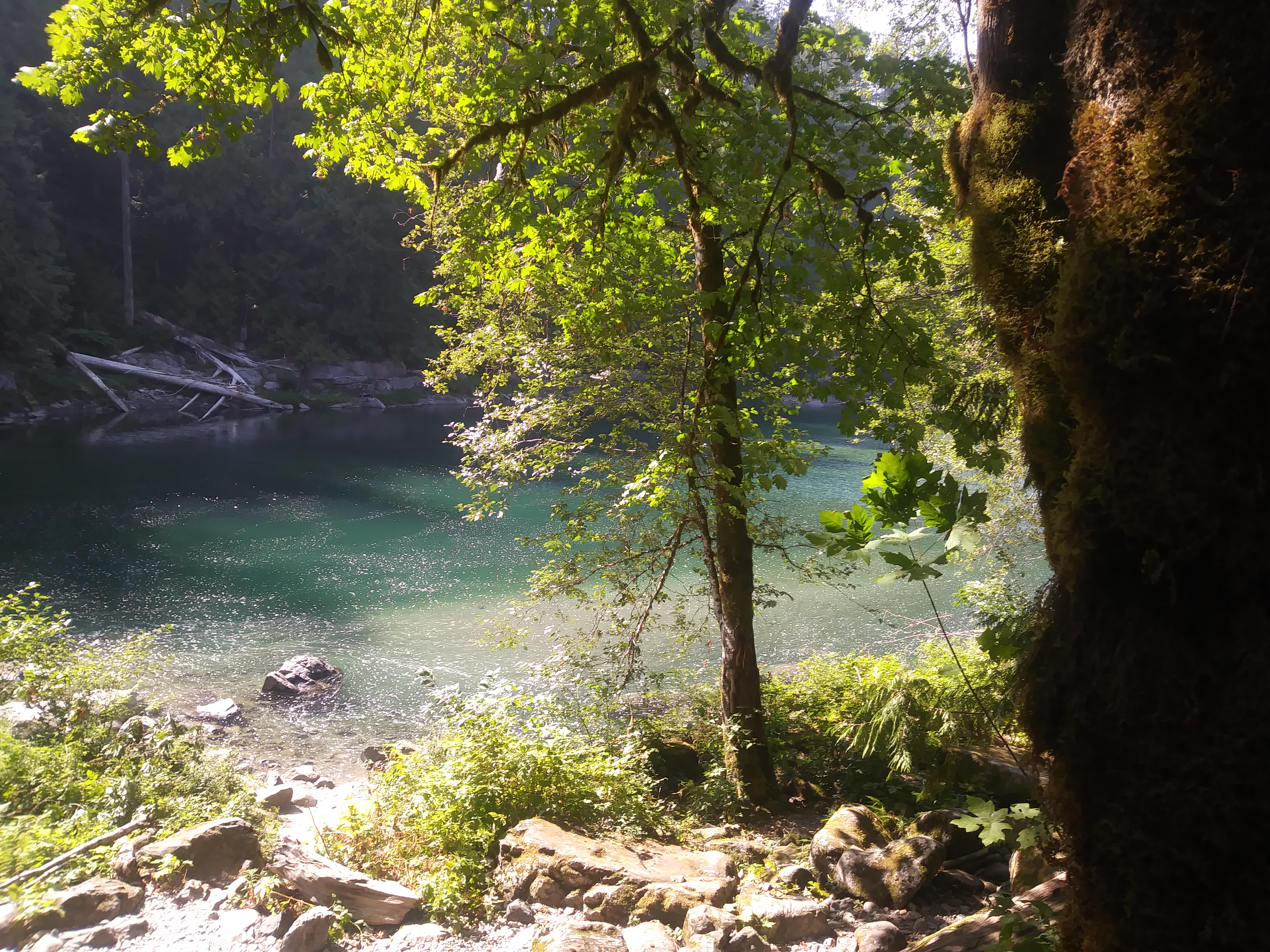
Skykomish River

The Skykomish River is a 29-mile (47 km) long river in the U.S. state of Washington which drains the west side of the Cascade Mountains in the southeast section of Snohomish County and the northeast corner of King County. The river starts with the confluence of the North Fork Skykomish River and South Fork Skykomish River approximately one mile west of Index, then flowing northwesterly towards Puget Sound. It is joined by the Sultan River and the Wallace River at Sultan. It then meets the Snoqualmie River to form the Snohomish River at Monroe. The Snohomish River continues along the river valley eventually dumping into Port Gardner Bay on Possession Sound (part of Puget Sound).

The name "Skykomish" comes from the Lushootseed name of the Skykomish people, sq̓ixʷəbš, meaning "upriver people." It is sometimes referred to by the nickname "Sky River" or "The Sky".

== Course ==
The Skykomish River's main stem is 29 miles (47 km) long, from the confluence of its North and South fork, until it and the Snoqualmie forms the Snohomish River. Adding the longest headwater tributaries, South Fork Skykomish and Tye River, the length is 62.4 miles (100 km). The Skykomish's drainage basin is 834 square miles (2,160 km^{2}) in area. U.S. Highway 2 and the BNSF Railway are routed to follow the Skykomish River, South Fork Skykomish, and Tye River to Stevens Pass and the Cascade Tunnel.

=== North Fork ===
The headwaters of the North Fork Skykomish River are located in the Henry M. Jackson Wilderness near Dishpan Gap along the Pacific Crest Trail. It flows as a small stream off the north slope of Skykomish Peak. The Wild Sky Wilderness protects tributaries and forests adjacent to the North Fork Skykomish, although not the river itself. The river flows generally in a southwestern direction from its source to its mouth. Just before picking up Goblin Creek, the river flows through a short but impressive canyon and within that canyon the river drops over Deer Falls. A short ways down from that, the river flows through an even shorter but very twisted and unusually shaped canyon at Bear Creek Falls.

- Pass Creek: Leads to Cady Pass.
- Quartz Creek: Flows from Monte Cristo Peak, leads to Curry Gap.
- Goblin Creek: Flows from Monte Cristo Peak.
- West Cady Creek
- Troublesome Creek: Flows from Monte Cristo Peak, through Blanca Lake, to join the North Fork just below Bear Creek Falls.
- Silver Creek: Rises near Silvertip Mountain and Poodle Dog Pass, flows by Mineral City, joins North Fork just above Galena (early route to Monte Cristo mining district; both Mineral City and Galena former mining towns).
- Salmon Creek: Joins North Fork just below Galena.
- Trout Creek: Upstream of the town of Index, just downstream of the Index-Galena Road washout. Trout Creek road is currently blocked (as of 2015).

=== South Fork ===
The South Fork Skykomish River begins at the confluence of the Tye River and the Foss River, to the east of Skykomish. From the confluence the South Fork flows northwest. Near the eastern boundary of the city of Skykomish, the Beckler River joins it. To the west of the city of Skykomish, the Miller River joins it. Shortly before converging with the North Fork the river drops over Eagle Falls, followed by Canyon Falls and then, finally, Sunset Falls before its confluence with the North Fork.

- Beckler River: Joins just below the river's source.
  - Rapid River
- Miller River: Joins at Miller River.
- Money Creek: Joins the South Fork near Grotto.
- Lowe Creek: Joins the South Fork between Baring and Grotto.
- Pinecone Creek: Joins the South Fork between Baring and Grotto.
- Index Creek: Joins the South Fork near Baring.
- Barclay Creek

== Discharge ==
According to the U.S. Geological Survey, the South Fork is about twice the size of the North Fork in terms of both discharge and watershed area above their confluence at Index, making it the true hydrologic source of the Skykomish River. The South Fork average flow of 2,431 cu ft/s (68.8 m^{3}/s) is sourced from a drainage area of 355 square miles (920 km^{2}), compared to the North Fork which has an average flow of 1,216 cu ft/s (34.4 m^{3}/s) from a drainage area of 146 square miles (380 km^{2}). In turn the source of the South Fork – in terms of streamflow – is the Rapid River, a tributary of the Beckler River, which in turn is a tributary of the South Fork Skykomish.

Glacial loss in the higher portion of the watershed in the Cascades has led to declining streamflow, especially during the late summer. In 2022, researchers determined that Hinman Glacier, which as recently as 1971 was the largest glacier in the river's watershed, had completely retreated as a result of climate change. As a whole, the area of the Skykomish watershed that was covered by glacial ice decreased from 3.8 km^{2} (1.5 mi^{2}) in 1958 to 1.7 km^{2} (0.66 mi^{2}) in 2022 - a 55% loss. Consequently, days with streamflow below the threshold necessary to maintain short-term survival of fish in the river has increased. Annual precipitation values had not been observed as declining.

== History ==
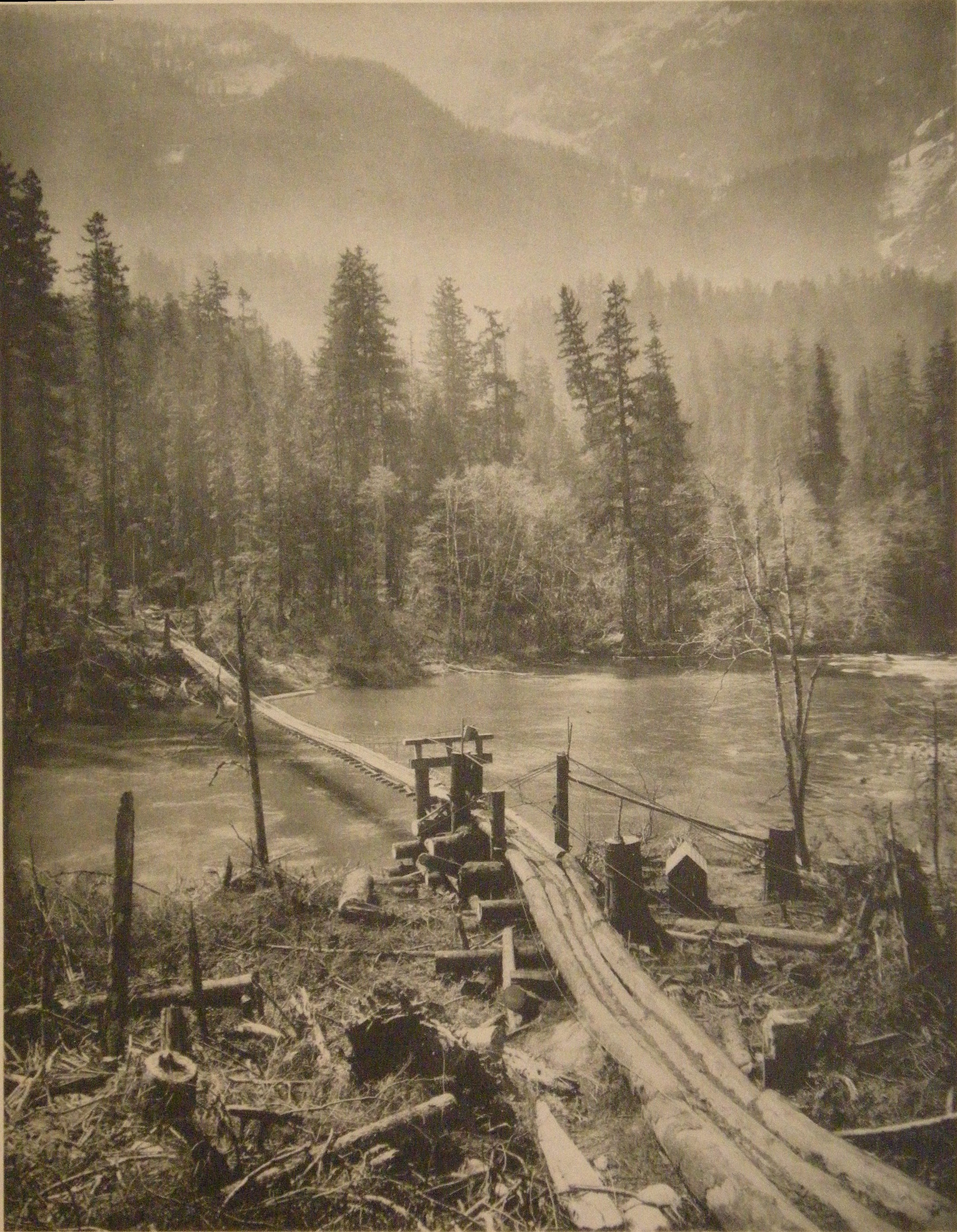
Loggers' bridge on the Skykomish (1910). Photo by Asahel Curtis.

In the 1890s the Great Northern Railway was built along the Skykomish, South Fork Skykomish, and Tye Rivers, crossing the crest of the Cascades at Stevens Pass. Today the track is owned by BNSF Railway, known as the Burlington Northern Railroad from 1970 to 1995. Stevens Pass is named after the Great Northern surveyor John Frank Stevens. Two railroad tunnels, both called Cascade Tunnel, were built at Stevens Pass. The first one was built slightly north of the pass. It was replaced in 1929 with the New Cascade Tunnel, which at 7.8 miles (12.6 km) long was for nearly 60 years the longest railroad tunnel in North America and is still the longest in the United States. The New Cascade Tunnel is a few miles south of Stevens Pass. Its western entrance is near the confluence of Tunnel Creek and the Tye River. A small amount of the water flows out of both tunnels into the Tye River. An interpretive center for the Iron Goat Trail, located at Scenic on the upper Tye River, describes the history of the area including the old railroad and new trail. The interpretive center was built near the site of one of the greatest railroad tragedies in American history, the Wellington Disaster.

One of the Native American trails crossing the Cascades followed the Skykomish and North Fork Skykomish to Cady Pass.

== Recreation ==
The Skykomish River is used for rafting and kayaking, especially around the Index, WA area during the summer months. The Skykomish River is mostly ranked between Class III and Class III+ rapids, depending on the circumstances and season, but includes Boulder Drop, a class IV+ rapids. Skykomish and its tributaries also popular place for recreational fishing. River is a home for chinook, coho and pink salmon, steelhead and bull trout.

== Waterfalls ==
North Fork

- Deer Falls
- Bear Creek Falls

South Fork

- Eagle Falls
- Canyon Falls
- Sunset Falls

== See also ==
- List of Washington rivers
