= Frog Mountain =

Mountain in Alabama, United States

- Location within Alabama

Highest point
- Elevation: 1,201 ft (366 m)
- Listing: List of mountains of the United States
- Coordinates: 34°00′22″N 85°34′01″W

Geography
- Location: Alabama, U.S.
- Topo map: USGS Center Grove

Frog Mountain is a summit in Cherokee County, Alabama, in the United States. With an elevation of 1,201 feet (366 m), Frog Mountain is the 214th highest summit in the state of Alabama.

Frog Mountain was named after Chief Frog, of the Cherokee.
