= Beckler Peak =

Mountain in Washington (state), United States

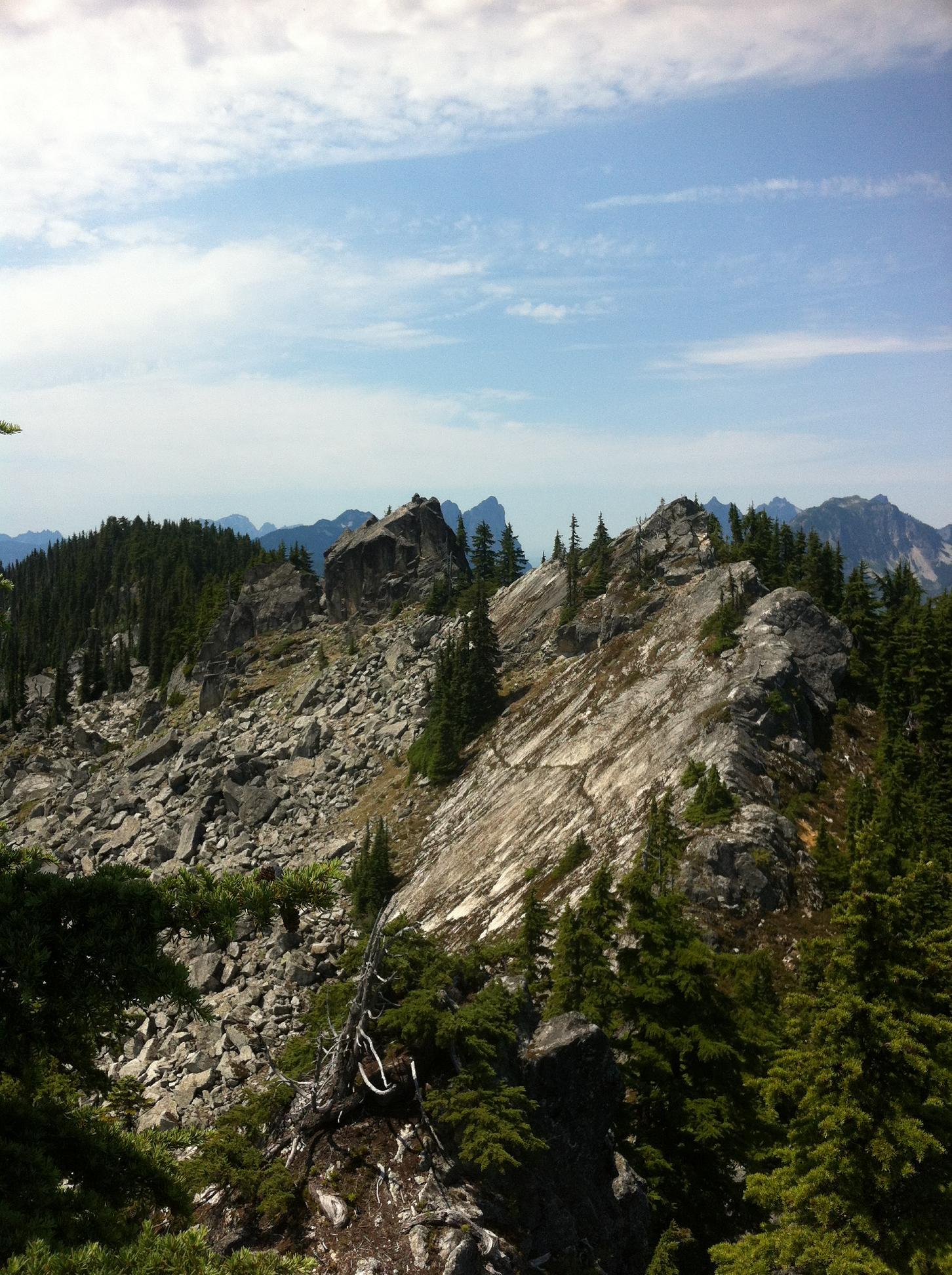
- West peak viewed from summit

Highest point
- Elevation: 5,026 ft (1,532 m)
- Coordinates: 47°44′11″N 121°17′21″W

Geography
- Location within Washington (state)
- Parent range: Cascade Range
- Topo map: USGS Skykomish

Climbing
- Easiest route: Beckler Peak Trail

Beckler Peak is a mountain in the U.S state of Washington located in the Mt. Baker-Snoqualmie National Forest near Skykomish.

== Hazards ==
The Northern slope is a sheer cliff.

== Recreation ==
The Beckler Peak Trail rises from the Jennifer Dunn trailhead to the summit, a rise of 2,263 ft (690 m). From the trailhead to the peak itself is a hike of approximately eight miles roundtrip. The summit affords a 360 degree view of the area, which includes Glacier Peak to the North.

== See also ==
- Mount Baker-Snoqualmie National Forest
- Mountain peaks of North America
- Mountain peaks of the United States
- Beckler River
