= Eagle Falls (Washington) =

Waterfall in Washington (state), United States

Coordinates: 47°47′44″N 121°30′51″W

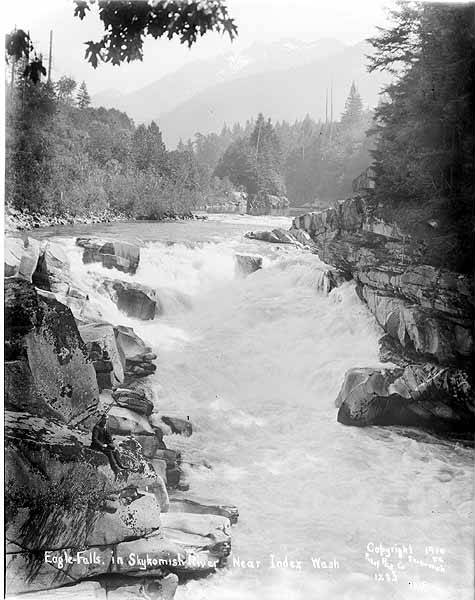
- The falls circa 1910
- Interactive map of Eagle Falls
- Location: Snohomish County, Washington, U.S.
- Type: Cascade
- Total height: 25 ft (7.6 m)
- Number of drops: 1
- Average width: 50 ft (15 m)
- Watercourse: South Fork Skykomish River

Eagle Falls is the uppermost waterfall on the South Fork Skykomish River in Washington. The falls are located downstream from the town of Baring and drop about 25 feet in a high volume cascade.

== Recreation ==
A lot of recreational activities happen at and near Eagle Falls, usually in the summer. Shortly after the falls, the river flows into a huge, deep, green pool. People often swim here on a hot day. The fact that cliffs up to 60 feet high rise above the pool and a rope swing is also there only makes the area more popular.

This waterfall is also occasionally run by expert kayakers. It is considered a class 5+ rapid and should only be attempted by extremely experienced paddlers. It has been the site of a fatal attempt.
