= Rapid River (Washington) =

The Rapid River is a tributary of the Beckler River in the U.S. state of Washington in the United States. It is 13 miles (21 km) long, with a drainage basin of 41 square miles (106 km^{2}).

The Rapid River originates at 47°49′19″N 121°7′28″W, at Grouse Lake and at 47°49′40″N 121°04′24″W on the west slopes of Jove Peak on the crest of the Cascades, 6 and 9 miles (10 and 14 km) east of the Beckler River. The latter source flows through Lake Janus—at 4,146 feet (1,264 m)—before meeting the Grouse Lake source creek, whereafter the river continues southwest. An early tributary comes from 4,742-foot (1,445 m) high Dow Lake, southwest of Union Pass and Union Peak, also on the Cascade crest. The Pacific Crest Trail follows the crest and parts of the high Rapid River basin. Both Jove and Union peaks are on the high crest of the Cascade Range, separating the Rapid River's drainage basin from the Little Wenatchee River drainage to the east. While the waters of the Rapid River ultimately empty into Puget Sound those of the Little Wenatchee enter the Columbia River via the Wenatchee River.

From its source near the crest of the Cascades the Rapid River flows southwest and west, collecting numerous headwater tributaries. The Rapid River makes a northward bend. Near the northernmost part of this bend a tributary stream originating in Cup Lake and Saucer Lake and Margaret Lake on the Cascade Crest joins. Soon the North Fork Rapid River joins as well, followed by Meadow Creek. The North Fork rises four miles to the north, its headwaters flowing from Pear Lake, Peach Lake, and Grass Lake, close to Wenatchee Pass on the Cascade crest. Some of the larger mountains in the Rapid River's basin include Valhalla Mountain, Scrabble Mountain, Scorpion Mountain, Sunrise Mountain, Evergreen Mountain, Grizzly Peak, and Fortune Mountain.

In terms of river size and streamflow, the true source of the South Fork Skykomish River is the Rapid River and Beckler River, even though the South Fork keeps its name above the Beckler confluence.

== See also ==
- List of rivers of Washington (state)
