= Henry M. Jackson Wilderness =

Protected area in the United States

- IUCN category Ib (wilderness area)
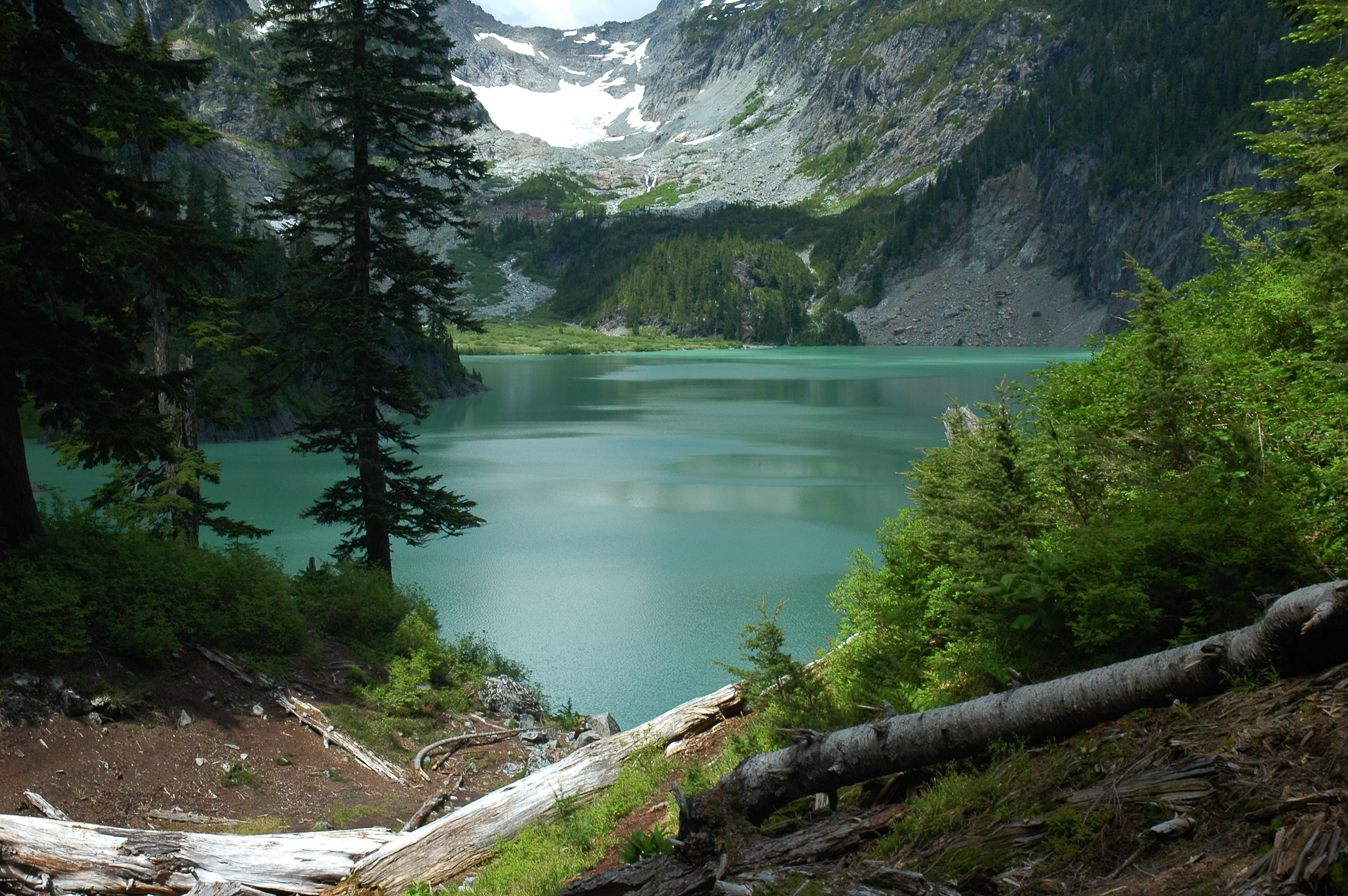
- Blanca Lake

- Location within the United States
- Location: Snohomish / Chelan / King counties, Washington, USA
- Nearest city: Seattle, WA
- Coordinates: 47°58′17″N 121°20′30″W
- Area: 103,297 acres (418.03 km^{2})
- Established: 1984
- Governing body: U.S. Forest Service

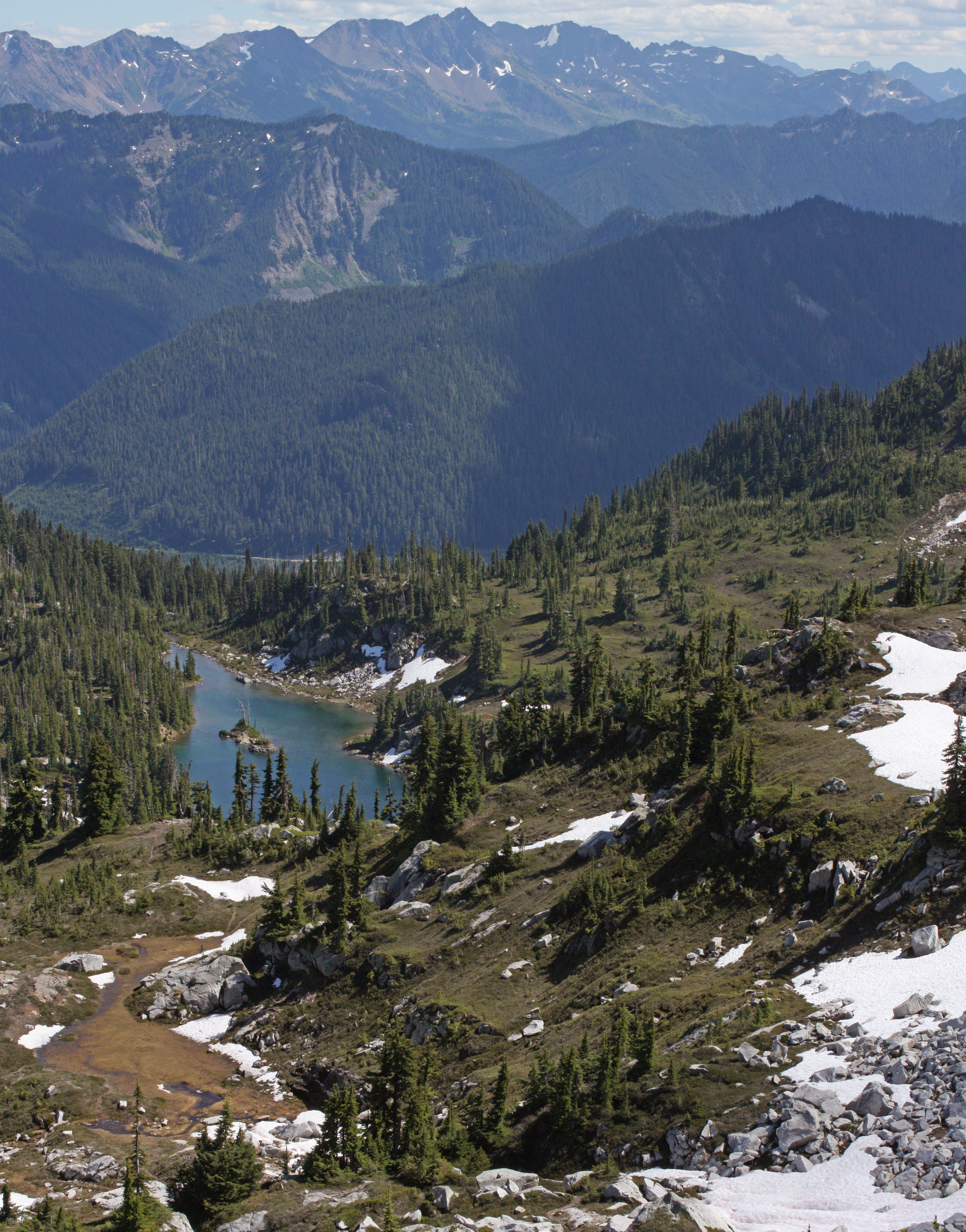
Minotaur Lake, 5,550 feet (1,690 m)

The Henry M. Jackson Wilderness is a 103,297-acre (41,803 ha) designated wilderness area in the state of Washington, United States. The area lies adjacent to the southwest corner of the Glacier Peak Wilderness, northwest of Stevens Pass on U.S. Highway 2 and northeast of the town of Skykomish, Washington. Wild Sky Wilderness is located immediately southwest of the Henry M. Jackson Wilderness. While the wilderness straddles the Cascade Mountain Range, most of it is in the westside ecotype. The wilderness lies in parts of Snoqualmie, Mount Baker, and Wenatchee national forests.

== History ==
The Henry M. Jackson Wilderness was created by the 1984 Washington Wilderness Act and named after former U.S. Senator Henry M. Jackson of Washington. Senator Jackson was instrumental in the designation of many of the state's wildernesses, and this "forest" of fabled peaks recalls his efforts.

Cross-Cascade Indian trails paralleled the Little Wenatchee River and provided routes for later exploring parties such as the 1860 E.F. Cady party for whom Cady Pass and Cady Creek were named. The area is rich in mining history with several acres of patented mining claims within its borders.

== Geographic features ==
The terrain is rugged, with steep slopes, and finger ridges dissected by small intermittent or permanent drainages. Streams in the northern portion of this area drain into the Sauk River, while the southern portion drains into the Skykomish River. Main features of this area include Skykomish Peak, Cady Creek Ridge and Cady Creek, as well as the Beckler River's tributary the Rapid River, the true source of the South Fork Skykomish River. The Pacific Crest National Scenic Trail traverses the southern portion of the wilderness.

The Pacific Crest National Scenic Trail winds down the high heart of the area for about 32 miles. Other trails snake up from the east and west to join the PCT. The Blanca Lake Trail leads 3.5 miles to Blanca Lake, and five short pathways approach the center of the northwest section and fade to bushwhacking terrain.

The wilderness area contains approximately 30 lakes which receive moderate fishing. One of the most popular of these lakes is Blanca Lake due to its beautiful turquoise green color.

== Flora and fauna ==
A tall forest covers the lower elevations, then thins out and changes in species to eventually open into broad meadows on many ridge tops. The vegetation includes western redcedar, Douglas fir, true firs, Engelmann spruce, western hemlock, mountain hemlock, sub-alpine meadows, and at higher elevations, alpine meadows.

== See also ==
- Ecology of the North Cascades
- Wilderness
