= Deception Falls =

Waterfall

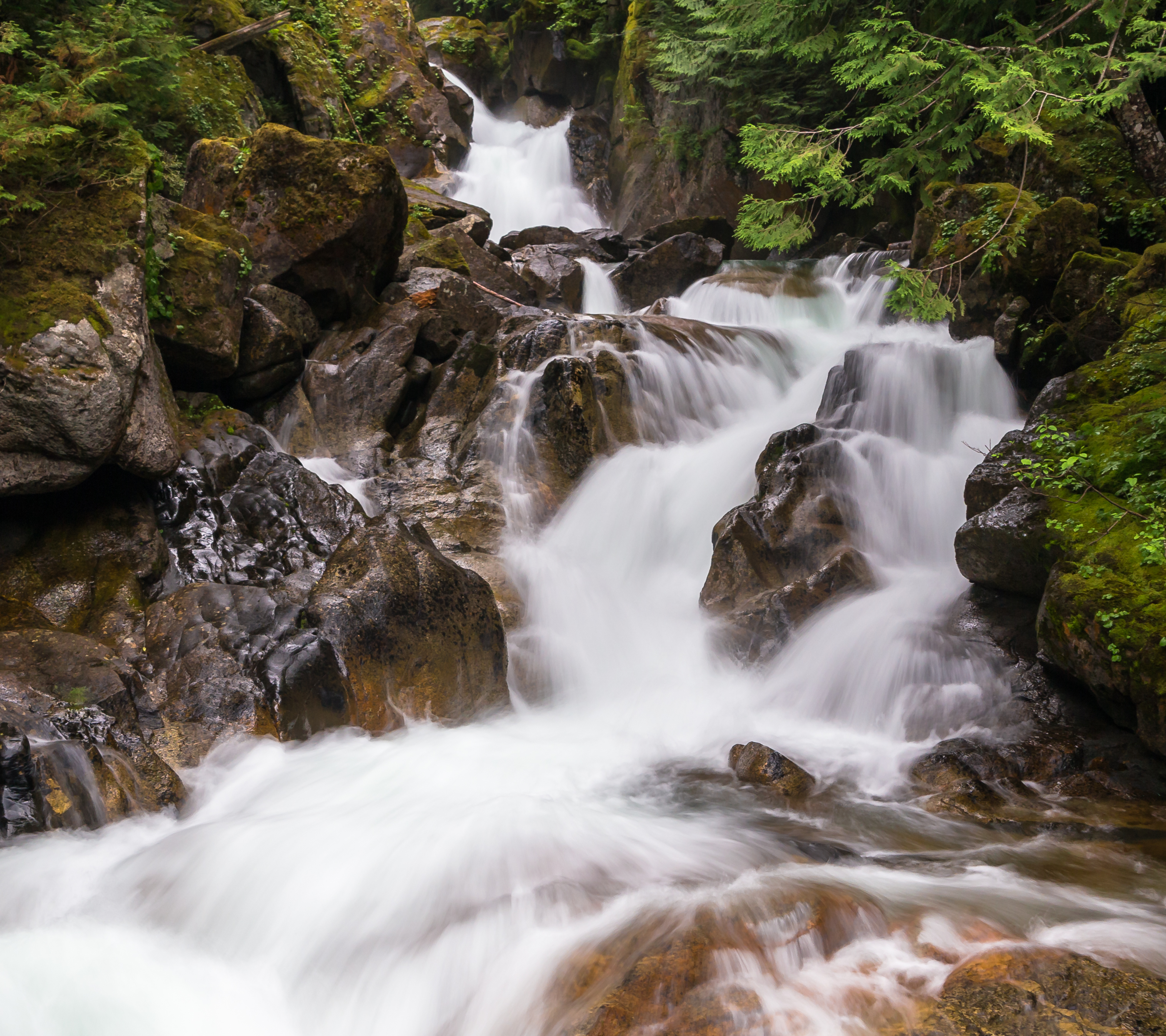
- Deception Falls flow in the Summer
- Interactive map of Deception Falls
- Location: King County, Washington
- Coordinates: 47.71444°N 121.19438°W
- Type: Steep Cascade
- Total height: 1,856 ft (566 m)
- Number of drops: 3
- Longest drop: 86 ft (26 m)
- Watercourse: Deception creek
- Average flow rate: 200 cu ft/s (5.7 m^{3}/s)

Deception Falls is a 94-foot (29 m) waterfall that flows from Deception Creek just over Stevens Pass, approximately 1856 feet above sea level, located in the U.S. state of Washington. Shortly downstream Deception Creek empties into Tye River. While flow may run dry in the late season, Deception Falls trail remains open in the Summer and Falls seasons. Deception Falls is located north of Interstate 90 in the Mount Baker–Snoqualmie National Forest. A hiking trail leads from a parking area to the falls.

== Location ==
Deception Falls is located in the Stevens Pass, a short distance from the Pacific Crest Trail, Northwest Washington. Two unnamed waterfalls are found upstream and Alpine Falls, Log Choke Falls, and Monkey Cage Falls are just downstream towards Tye River. The waterfalls are located along highway 2 and 8.5 miles east of the community of Skykomish, Washington and the same distance West of Stevens Pass ski resort. Access is found through the Deception Creek Trailhead off Forest Road 6088, which connects to U.S. Route 2.

== See also ==
- List of waterfalls in Washington
