= Deception Creek (Washington) =

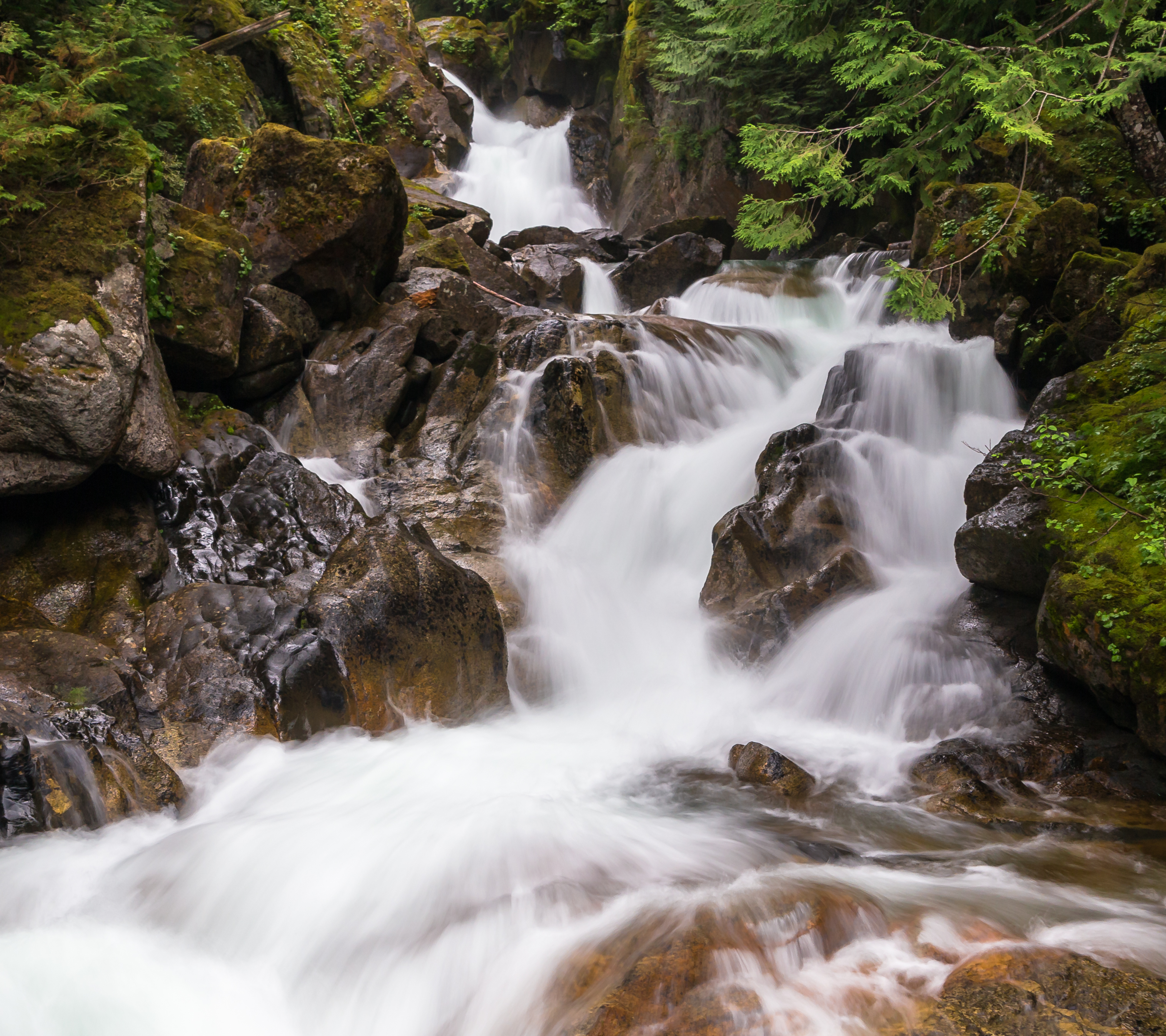
- Deception Falls on Deception Creek

Location
- Country: United States
- State: Washington
- County: King
- Town: Stevens Pass

Physical characteristics
- Source: Trico Lake
  - location: West of Stevens Pass
  - coordinates: 47°43′01″N 121°11′36″W
  - elevation: 1,855 ft (565 m)
- Length: 9 m (30 ft)

Deception Creek is a river that is located in Northwestern King County, Washington. The river starts at the outlet of Trico Lake on Trico Mountain and flows north before flowing into Tye River east of Skykomish. The last stretch of Deception Creek before joining the Tye River forms a cliff that houses the Deception Falls, an 86 feet waterfall.

== Course ==
White Creek rises in the southwestern quarter of the Alpine Lakes Wilderness boundary. The river starts at the north shore of Trico Lake on the west skirt of Trico Mountain. A handful of additional creeks from Trico Lake as well as a creek from Talus Lake from the east, Marmot Lake and Lake Clarice from the west hills join Deception Creek about a mile downstream. The creek runs generally north-northwest for approximately 4.5 miles, at the western slopes of Surprise Mountain and later Spark Plug Mountain. Half way its course it meets Fisher Creek arriving from Fisher Lake.

It then picks up Sawyer Creek east of Forest Road 6830. Deception Creek keeps a fairly straight course north, creates an 86 waterfall, Deception Falls less than half a mile before flowing into the Tye River just south of the Old Cascade Highway.

== Trail ==
Deception Creek trail starts at Deception Falls and travels along Deception Creek up to about half its course where Fisher Creek joins Deception Creek from Fisher Lake on the West. The trail at this point forks to the west as Fisher Lake trail and meets spur trail 1059.1, the Tonga-Ridge trail 1058 south of Mount Sawyer. There are approximately 2 miles from the Deception Creek trail to Fisher Lake. Approximately 2.5 miles south the trail reaches spur trail 1059.2, which connects to the Pacific Crest National Trail 2000. Spark Plug Mountain is 6277 feet high and located to the East of the fork between Fisher Creek and Deception Creek. At the Eastern slope of Spark Plug Mountain is Glacier Lake and to the south is Surprise Mountain at 6247 feet high.

== See also ==
- List of peaks of the Alpine Lakes Wilderness
- List of waterfalls in Washington
