= List of waterfalls in Washington =

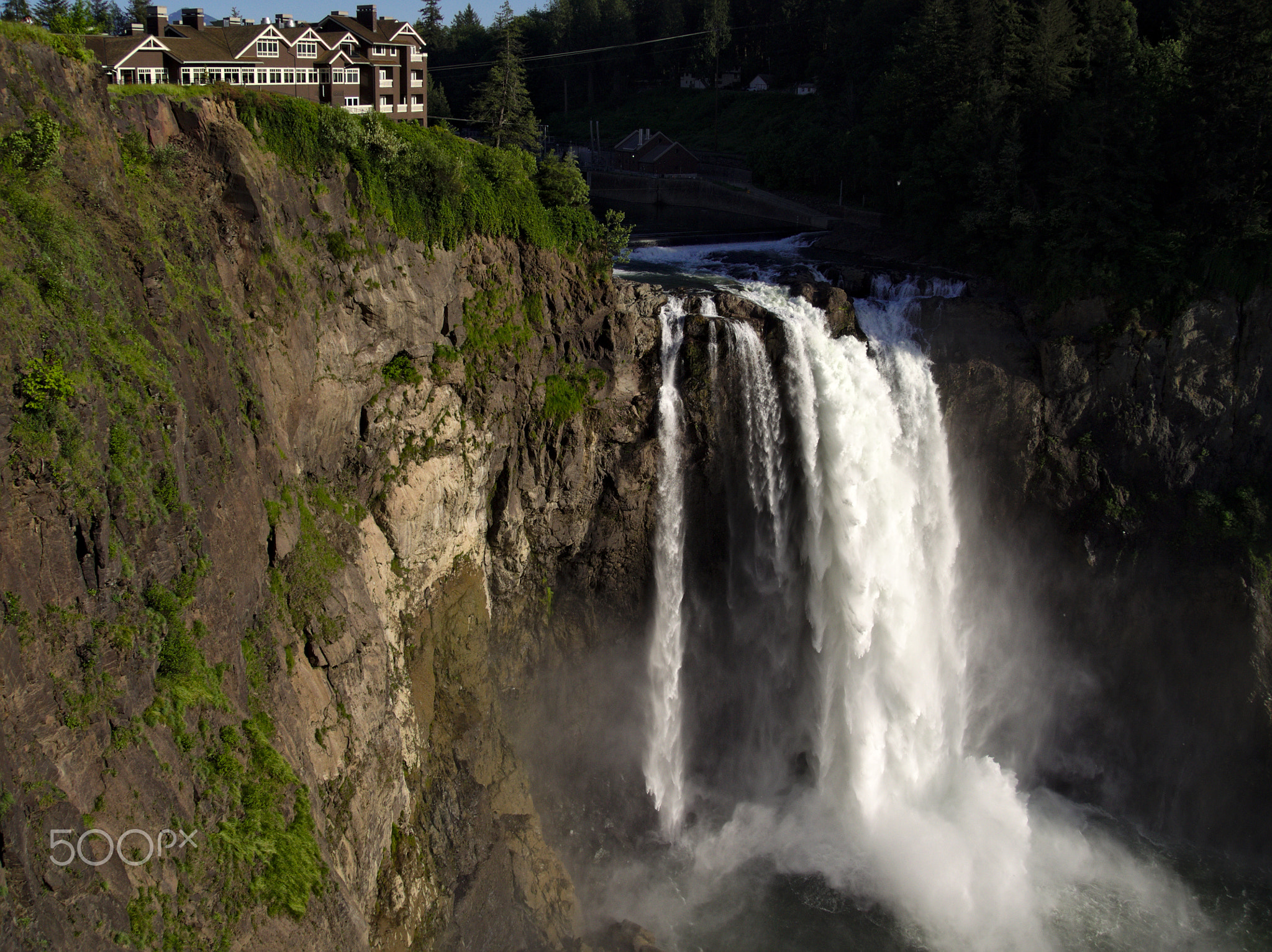
Snoqualmie Falls along the Snoqualmie River

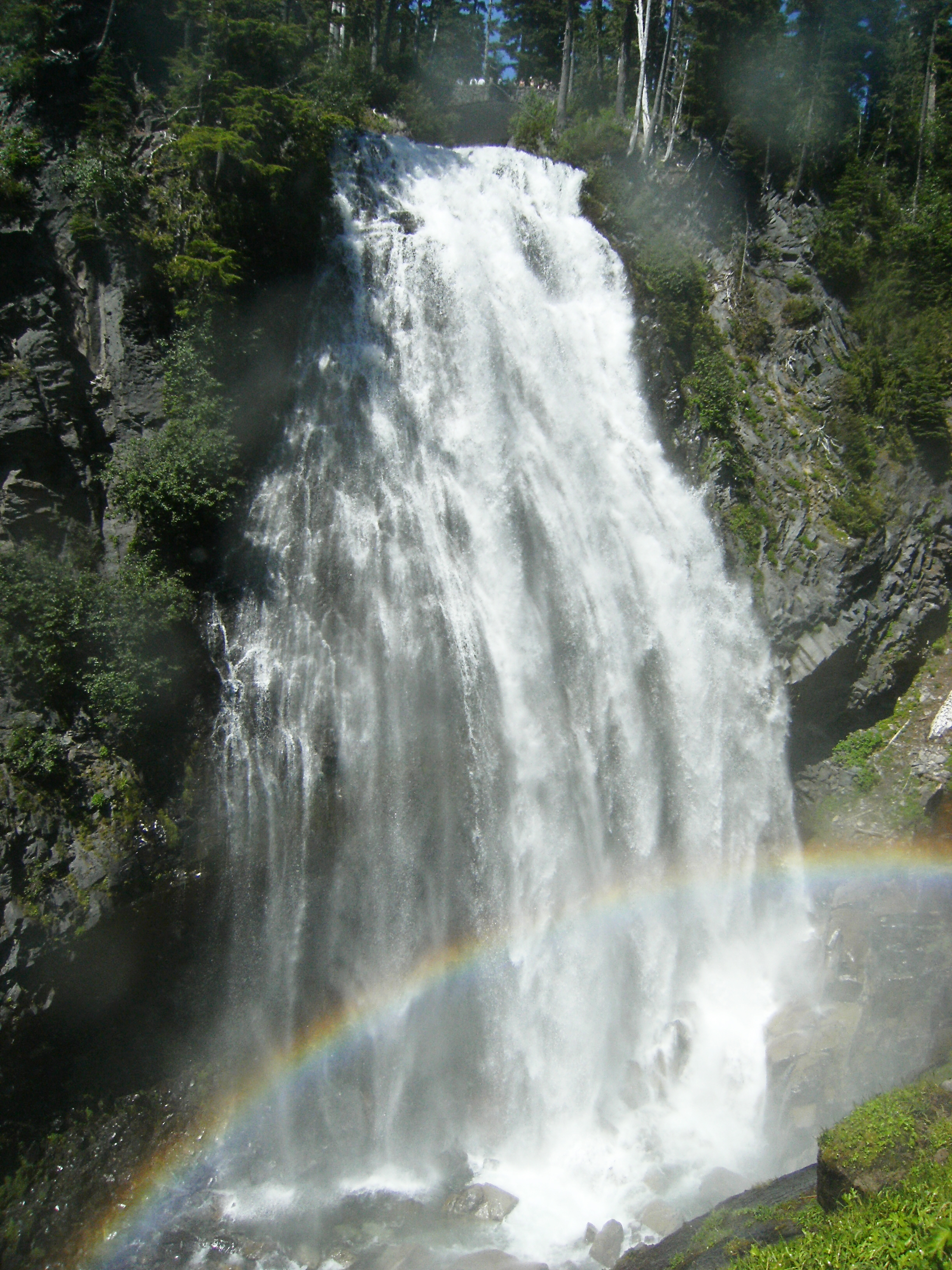
Narada Falls within the Mount Rainier National Park

There are over 3,000 catalogued waterfalls in the U.S. state of Washington, according to the World Waterfall Data Base This is more than any other U.S. State and includes Colonial Creek Falls, the tallest waterfall in the continental United States and the tallest in any U.S. National Park, at 2,568 feet in height. The second tallest is Johannesburg falls (not named after the South Africa City, but after the names of historical settlers.) Its total height is 2,465 feet. Both waterfalls are in North Cascades National Park.

name	elevation	coordinate	USGS Map	GNIS ID
Bridal Veil Falls	1,601 ft (488 m)	47°47′21.38″N 121°34′4.39″W	Bridal Veil Falls	1516944
Camp Creek Falls	1,320 ft (400 m)	46°26′55.3″N 121°50′7.8″W		
Christine Falls	69 ft (21 m)	46°46′51″N 121°46′47″W		
Colonial Creek Falls		48.67023°N 121.14044°W		
Comet Falls	5,545 ft (1,690 m)	46°47′45.4″N 121°46′38.3″W	Comet Falls	1517992
Curly Creek Falls	1,270 ft (390 m)	46°3′29.4″N 121°58′19.3″W	Curly Creek Falls	1529581
Deception Falls	1,890 ft (580 m)	47°2′52.4″N 121°11′36.4″W	Deception Falls	1518564
Eightmile Creek Falls	870 ft (270 m)	45°39′31.5″N 121°5′14.2″W	Eightmile Creek	1519205
Falls Creek Falls	2,178 ft (664 m)	45°54′36.4″N 121°54′48.3″W	Fall Creek Falls	1529516
Franklin Falls	2,589 ft (789 m)	49°25′29.4″N 121°25′58.3″W	Franklin Falls	1519768
Hompegg Falls	3,031 ft (924 m)	46°9′53.9″N 117°48′39.9″W	Hompegg Falls	1505586
Johannesburg Falls		48.47655 N 121.09132 W		
Lewis River Falls	1,483 ft (452 m)	46°9′16.4″N 121°52′46.3″W	Lower Falls	1522538
Little Klickitat Falls	79 ft (24 m)	45°49′4.4″N 121°7′26.2″W	Klickitat River	1521728
Log Choke Falls	1,625 ft (495 m)	48°2′58.3″N 123°47′20.11″W		
Marymere Falls	5,545 ft (1,690 m)	48°2′58.3″N 123°47′20.11″W	Marymere Falls	1522788
Monkey Cage Falls	1,767 ft (539 m)	47°43′1″N 121°11′41.2″W		
Myrtle Falls	5,545 ft (1,690 m)	46°47′28.5″N 121°43′55.9″W		
Narada Falls	5,545 ft (1,690 m)	46°46′30.4″N 121°44′47.3″W	Narada Falls	1533594
Palouse Falls	725 ft (221 m)	46°39′48.5″N 118°13′24.9″W	Palouse Falls	1510548
Panther Creek Falls	906 ft (276 m)	45°52′2.4″N 121°49′39.2″W	Panther Creek Campground	1529310
Rainbow Falls	1,647 ft (502 m)	48°20′36.9″N 120°41′56.1″W	Rainbow Creek	1524818
Outlet Falls	1,604 ft (489 m)	46°1′4.4″N 121°10′25.3″W	Outlet Falls	1507227
Rock Creek Falls	1,700 ft (520 m)	47°6′31.9″N 117°45′58.5″W	Rock Creek Creek	1507852
Rocky Brook Falls	585 ft (178 m)	47°43′14.8″N 122°56′30″W		
Sheep Creek Falls	3,853 ft (1,174 m)	46°11′44.5″N 117°37′27.2″W	Sheep Creek	1508269
Silver Falls	5,545 ft (1,690 m)	46°45′8.3″N 121°33′33.7″W	Silver Falls	1525772
Siouxson Falls	1,275 ft (389 m)	45°57′35.8″N 122°9′5.1″W		
Snoqualmie Falls	259 ft (79 m)	47°32′29.4″N 121°50′14.3″W	Snoqualmie Creek	1526015
Snoquera Falls	3,730 ft (1,140 m)	47°2′23.9″N 121°33′9.2″W		
Sol Duc Falls	1,952 ft (595 m)	47°57′2.3″N 123°48′54.7″W	Sol Duc Falls	1526098
Spirit Falls	5,545 ft (1,690 m)	45°43′36.2″N 121°37′59.1″W		
Spray Falls	1,555 ft (474 m)	48°7′58.7″N 119°0′22.7″W	Spray Creek	1508617
Sweeny Falls	5,545 ft (1,690 m)	45°42′33.6″N 121°50′39.9″W		
Tumwater Falls	82 ft (25 m)	47.0147°N 122.9046°W		
Wallace Falls	5,545 ft (1,690 m)	47°52′23.4″N 121°38′56.4″W	Wallace Falls	1527774
Whinnimic Falls	1,322 ft (403 m)	47°29′1.3″N 121°16′58.1″W		
Wonder Falls	1,322 ft (403 m)	46°2′16.4″N 121°10′34.3″W	Wonder Falls	1509608

== See also ==
- List of waterfalls
- List of lakes of the Alpine Lakes Wilderness
- Waterfalls of the West Fork Foss River Valley
