= Monkey Cage Falls =

Waterfall

Deception Falls
- Interactive map of Deception Falls
- Location: King County, Washington
- Coordinates: 47.71695°N 121.19477°W
- Type: Sliding Punchbowl
- Total height: 1,767 ft (539 m)
- Number of drops: 1
- Longest drop: 16 ft (4.9 m)
- Watercourse: Tye River
- Average flow rate: 400 cu ft/s (11 m^{3}/s)

Monkey Cage Falls is a 16-foot (4.9 m) waterfall that flows from Tye River just over Stevens Pass, approximately 1767 feet above sea level, located in the U.S. state of Washington. Access is usually approached with kayaks, a hiking trail leads from a parking area to Deception Falls upstream from which improvised trails lead to the edge of the Tye River with angled views of the waterfall.

== Location ==
Monkey Cage Falls is located in the Stevens Pass area, a short distance from the Pacific Crest Trail, Northwest Washington. Two unnamed waterfalls are found downstream and Alpine Falls, Log Choke Falls, and Deception Falls are just upstream the Tye River. The waterfalls are located along highway 2 and 8.5 miles east of the community of Skykomish, Washington and the same distance West of Stevens Pass ski resort. Access is found through the Deception Creek Trailhead off of Forest Road 6088 that spins off Hwy 2.

== See also ==
- List of waterfalls in Washington
