= Spark plug (disambiguation) =

A spark plug is an electrical device in some internal combustion engines and ignites fuel by means of an electric spark.

Spark plug may also refer to:

- Spark plug, a rod of uranium or plutonium in a hydrogen bomb used to heat the fusion fuel to the point of nuclear fusion
- Bob "Spark Plug" Holly, an American professional wrestler
- Spark Plug, Barney Google's race horse from the Barney Google and Snuffy Smith comic strip
- Spark Plug (album), a 1971 album by jazz soul guitarist Melvin Sparks
- "Spark Plug", a song by Stereolab from their 1996 album Emperor Tomato Ketchup
- "Spark Plug", a song by Idiot Pilot from their 2005 album Strange We Should Meet Here
- Spark Plug Mountain, in Washington, United States

Sparkplug may also refer to:

- Sparkplug Witwicky, a Transformers G1 human character
- Sparkplug lighthouse, a type of lighthouse named for its shape
- Sparkplug Comics, a comics publisher
- "Eclipse Sparkplug", an open specification for controlling industrial devices over the MQTT protocol
