= Mowich Lake =

Lake in Pierce County, Washington, United States

- Crater Lake (former)
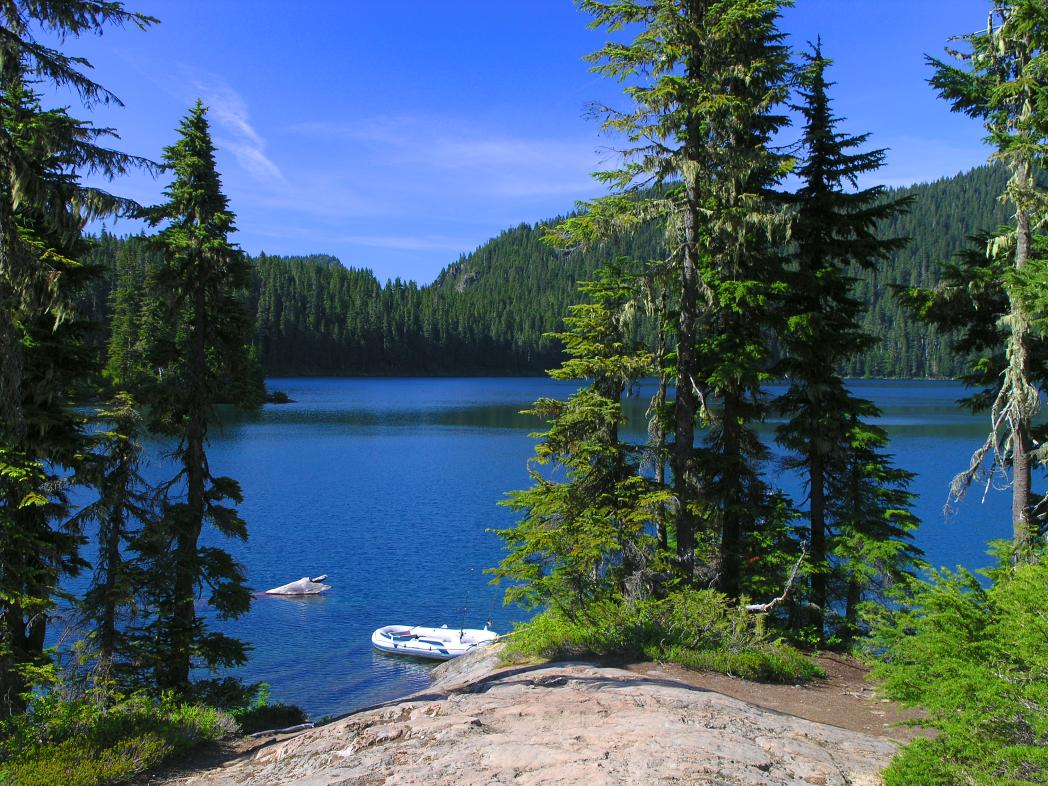

- Location within Washington (state) Location within the United States
- Location: Mount Rainier National Park, Pierce County, Washington
- Coordinates: 46.93872°N 121.86149°W
- Primary outflows: Crater Creek
- Basin countries: United States
- Surface area: 118 acres (0.5 km^{2})
- Surface elevation: 4,929 ft (1,502 m)

Mowich Lake is a lake located in the northwestern corner of Mount Rainier National Park in Washington state at an elevation of 4,929 feet (1,502 m). The name "Mowich" derives from the Chinook Jargon word for deer.

Access to the lake is provided by a 17 miles (27 km) long unpaved road which opens to vehicles in mid June to early July. Mowich Lake is also a busy campground during the summer with 30 walk-in tent camping spots. Bathrooms, tables, and trash bins are provided.

From the Mowich campground, hikers can reach the Wonderland Trail, Eunice Lake, Tolmie Peak, Spray Park, and Spray Falls. Old-growth trees, waterfalls, creeks, cliffs, and wildflower meadows are also located in and around the area.

Fishing is generally poor at Mowich Lake because the area is not stocked with fish and no habitat is provided for natural spawning.

This body of water was named Crater Lake in 1883 by the geologist Bailey Willis under the belief that it was formed in a volcanic crater, however I. C. Russell later wrote that the land was shaped instead by ice erosion. Willis concurred. Correspondents to the U.S. Board on Geographic Names (BGN) proposed Mowich to avoid ambiguity with the well-known Crater Lake to the south in Oregon. Mowich Lake was designated the official name by the BGN in 1919. The name of its outflow Crater Creek remained unchanged.
