= Eunice Lake (Pierce County, Washington) =

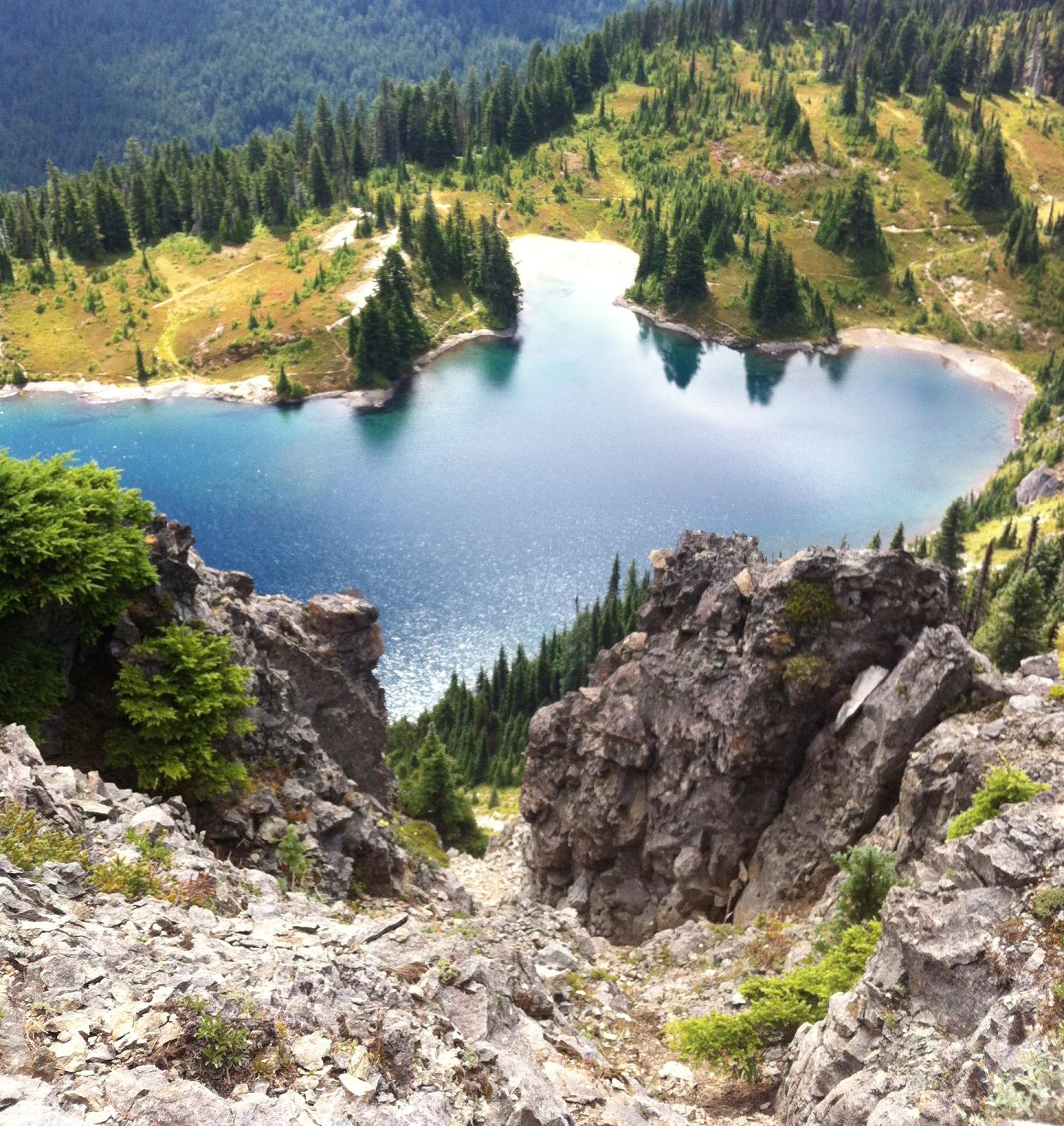
- Looking down on the lake from Tolmie Peak

- Location within Washington (state) Location within the United States
- Location: Pierce County, Washington
- Coordinates: 46°57′19″N 121°52′41″W
- Lake type: Glacial lake
- Basin countries: United States
- Surface elevation: 5,358 ft (1,633 m)
- Islands: 0

Eunice Lake is a glacial lake located in Pierce County, Washington and in the northwest part of Mount Rainier National Park. The lake was named after Eunice Sargent Roth by her husband Andy (Adolph) Roth who grew up in Washogal and was active in the forest service for many years. The lake is a popular area for hiking.

== Gallery ==
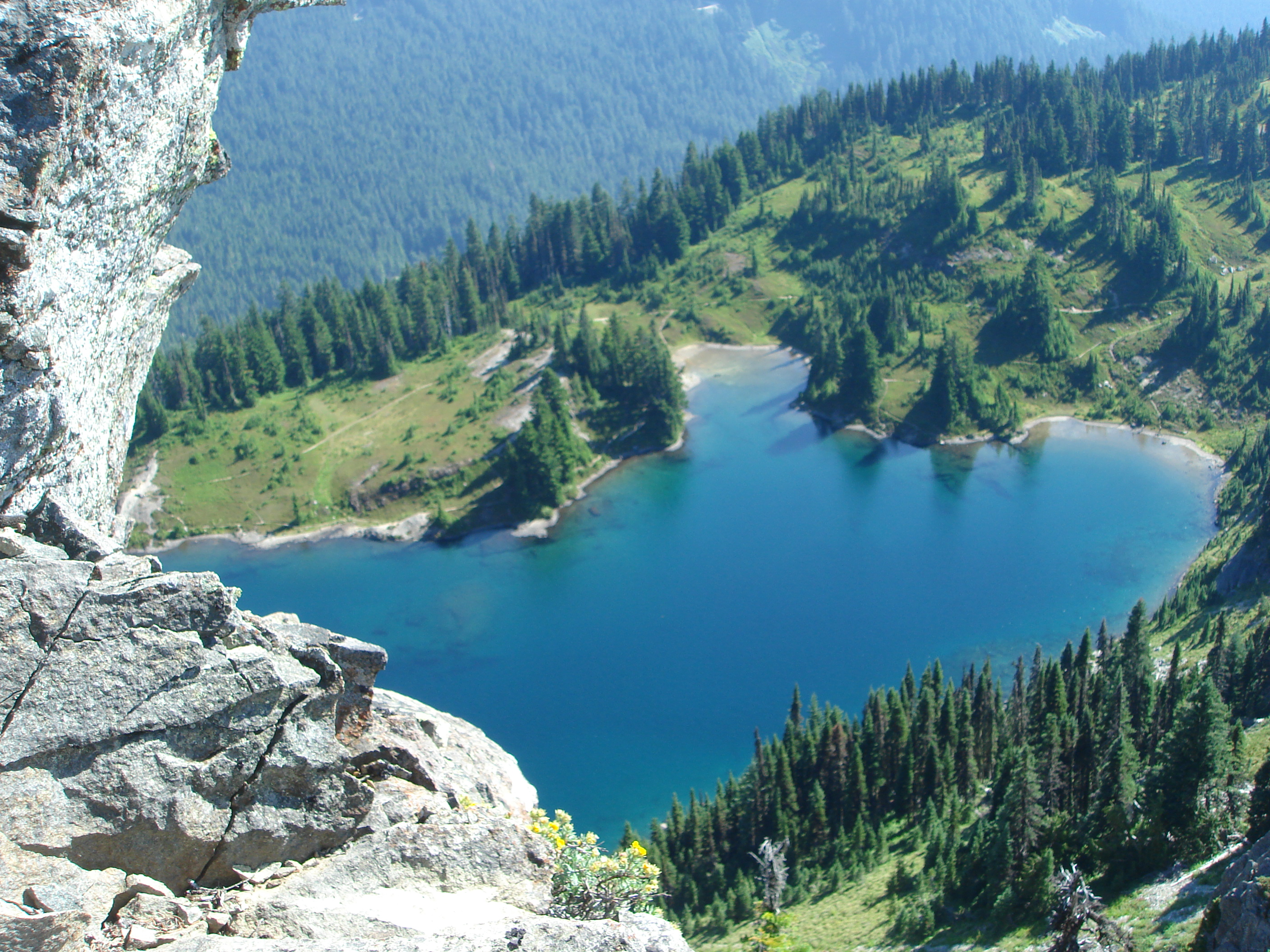
Taken in 2006

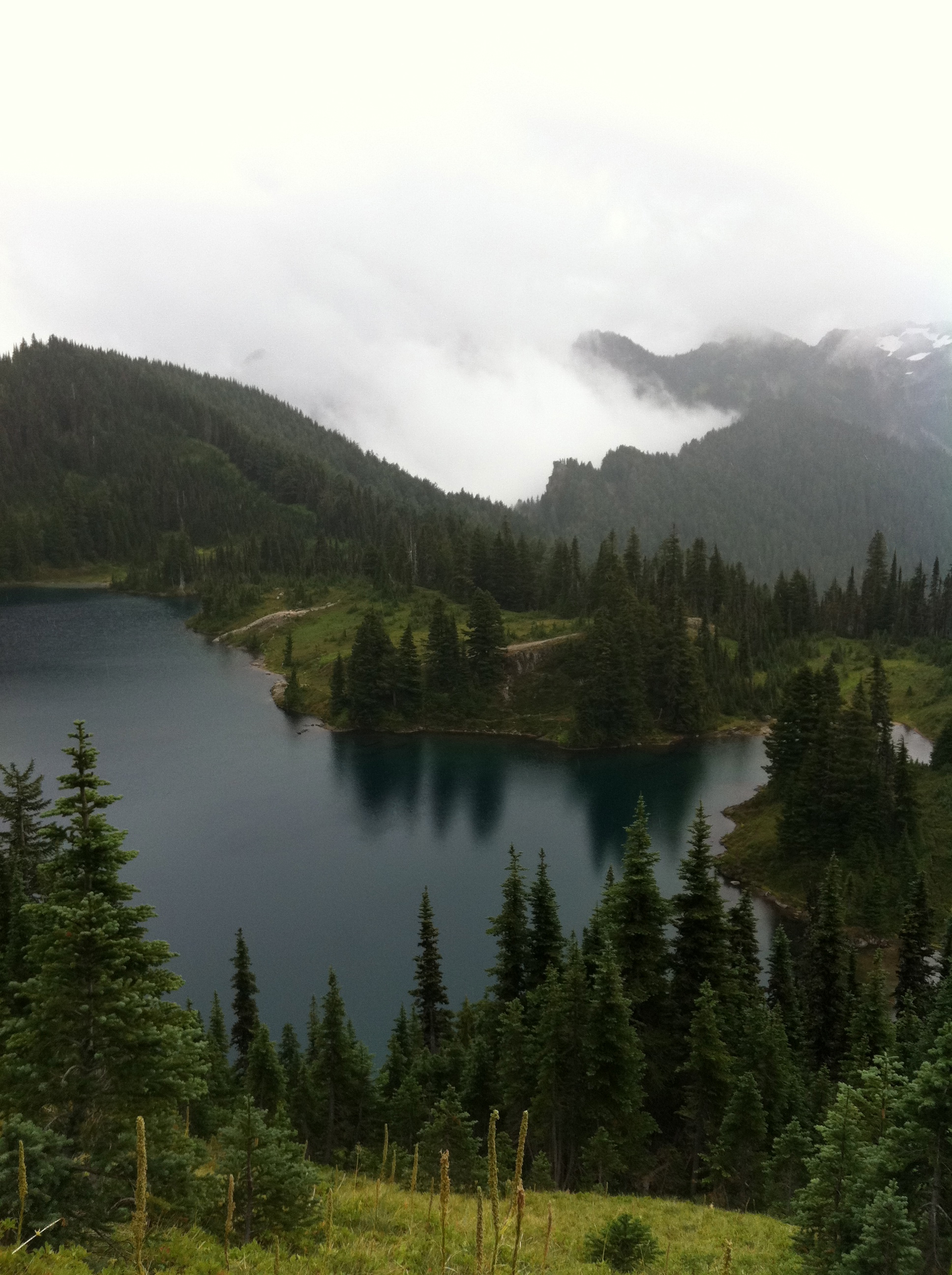
Taken in 2011.

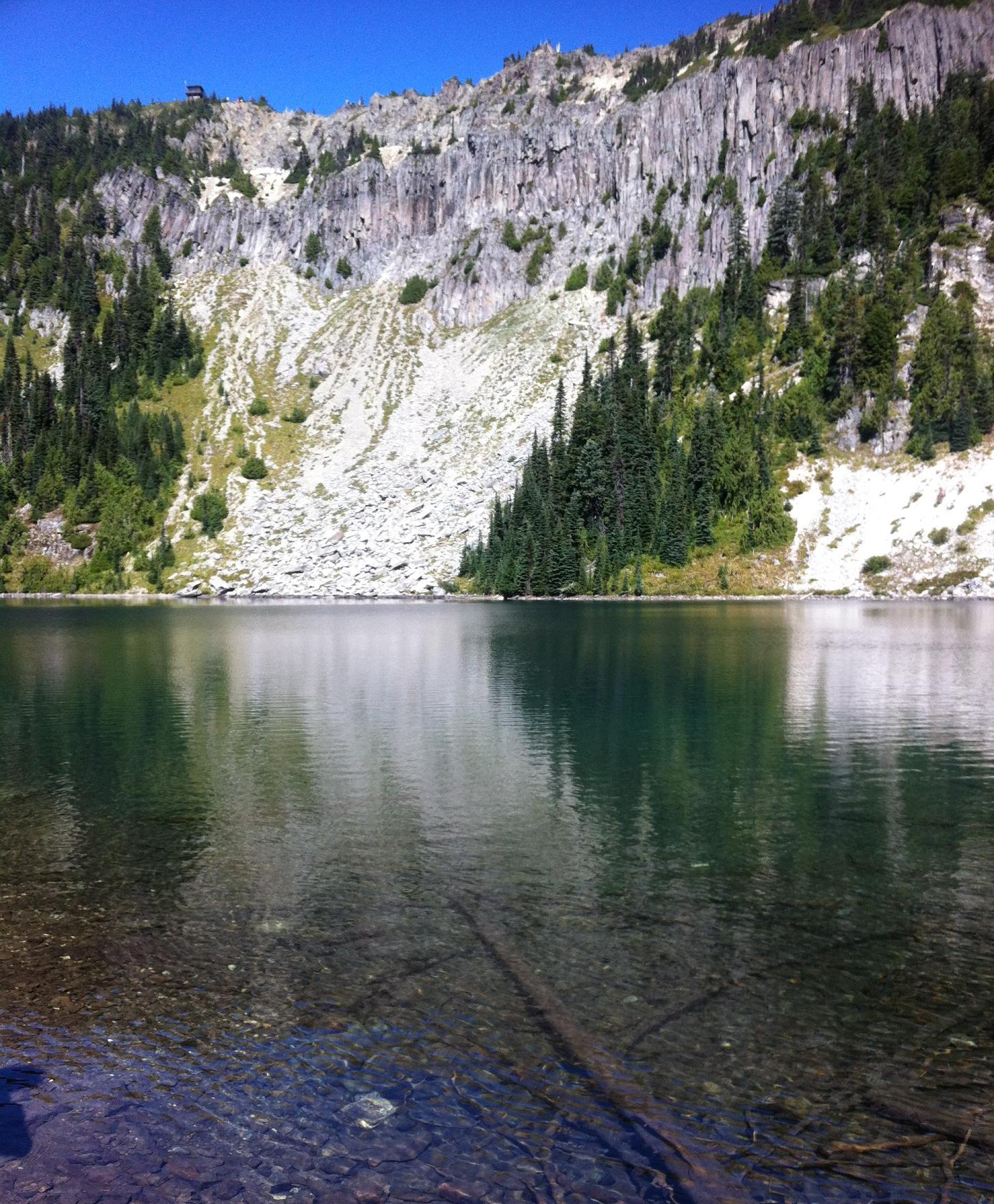
Eunice Lake, looking toward the Tolmie Peak Lookout. Taken in 2015.

== See also ==
- Mowich Lake
- Tolmie Peak
