= Cowboy Mountain =

Mountain in King County, Washington, United States

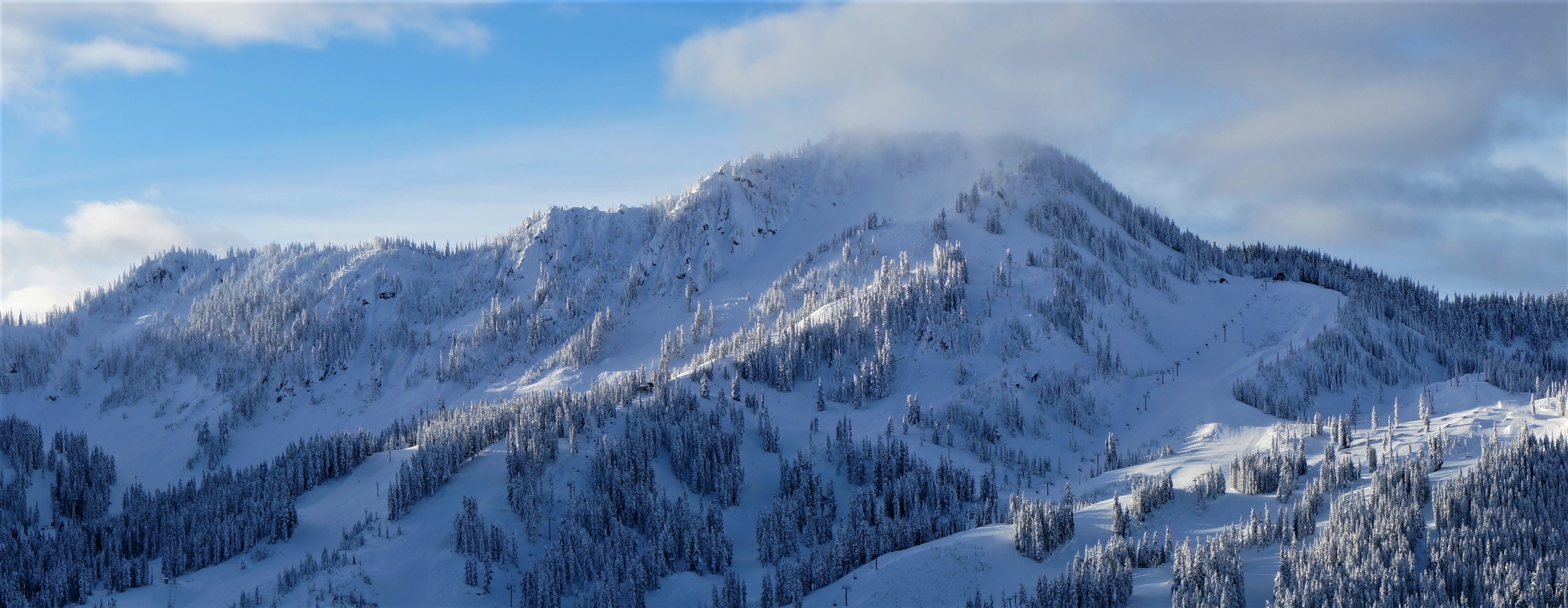
- Cowboy Mountain, north aspect

Highest point
- Elevation: 5,853 ft (1,784 m)
- Prominence: 773 ft (236 m)
- Parent peak: Big Chief Mountain (5,858 ft)
- Isolation: 1.9 mi (3.1 km)
- Coordinates: 47°43′56″N 121°06′09″W

Geography
- Location within Washington (state) Location within the United States
- Country: United States
- State: Washington
- County: King
- Parent range: Chiwaukum Mountains; Wenatchee Mountains; Cascade Range
- Topo map: USGS Stevens Pass

Climbing
- Easiest route: class 2 Scrambling

Cowboy Mountain is a 5,853-foot-elevation (1,784-meter) mountain summit located in northeast King County of Washington state. It is situated at Stevens Pass, on land managed by Mount Baker-Snoqualmie National Forest. This mountain is best known for ski runs on its north slopes which are part of the Stevens Pass Ski Area. Cowboy Mountain is part of the Chiwaukum Mountains, which are a subset of the Cascade Range. Its nearest higher neighbor is Big Chief Mountain, 1.9 mi (3.1 km) to the northeast, and the Pacific Crest Trail passes through the saddle between these two mountains. Precipitation runoff from the peak drains into headwaters of the Tye River, which in turn is a tributary of the Skykomish River. The longest railroad tunnel in the United States, the Cascade Tunnel, was bored directly under Cowboy Mountain, as a response to deadly avalanches that threatened trains of the Great Northern Railway. The deadliest avalanche in the history of the United States, the 1910 Wellington avalanche, occurred approximately two miles west of Cowboy Mountain.

== Climate ==
Cowboy Mountain is located in the marine west coast climate zone of western North America. Weather fronts originating in the Pacific Ocean travel northeast toward the Cascade Mountains. As fronts approach, they are forced upward by the peaks of the Cascade Range, causing them to drop their moisture in the form of rain or snow onto the Cascades (Orographic lift). As a result, the west side of the Cascades experiences high precipitation, especially during the winter months in the form of snowfall. Because of maritime influence, snow tends to be wet and heavy, resulting in high avalanche danger. During winter months, weather is usually cloudy, but, due to high pressure systems over the Pacific Ocean that intensify during summer months, there is often little or no cloud cover during the summer.

== See also ==
- List of mountains of Washington (state)
- Stevens Pass Ski Area
- Jim Hill Mountain
