= Little Klickitat Falls =

Waterfall

- Interactive map of Little Klickitat Falls
- Location: Klickitat County, Washington
- Coordinates: 45.817889°N 121.123944°W
- Type: Wide Steep Cascade
- Total height: 1,095 ft (334 m)
- Number of drops: 1
- Longest drop: 16 ft (4.9 m)
- Watercourse: Little Klickitat River
- Average flow rate: 400 cu ft/s (11 m^{3}/s) avg high vol

Little Klickitat Falls is a 16-foot (4.9 m) waterfall that flows from Little Klickitat River, a tributary of Klickitat River, approximately 1095 feet above sea level, located in the U.S. state of Washington. Shortly downstream Little Klickitat River joins the Blockhouse Creek on the basalt tabletop of Horseshoe Bend canyon. While flow runs dry in the early season, Little Klickitat Falls may reach up to 100 feet wide in the flood seasons. Little Klickitat Falls is located north of Interstate 84 in the heart of steep canyons in central Klickitat County.

== Location ==
Little Klickitat Falls is located south of State Route 142 as it runs a west–east route towards Goldendale. The waterfall is west of U.S. Route 97, which runs along the eastern boundary of Goldendale while Interstate 84 and State Route 14 are approximately 30 km (19 mi) south.

Little Klickitat Falls is found on private land along the course of Little Klickitat River a few yards before it makes tributary with Blockhouse Creek and Blockhouse Falls. Klickitat River runs through a high desert canyon that can be reached by way of Patch Lane from the East or Tupper Road from the West. The waterfall is wide at high flow and is runnable by Kayak down Little Klickitat River at flood flow levels down the far right or far left of the waterfall. The middle of the falls have several shallow spots on the bedrock for middle approaches. Several white water spots are found upstream leading to the waterfall. Access can be found upstream of Little Klickitat River on Olson Rd off Hwy 142. Further East there is a parking area downstream a bridge off Hill Rd/Esteb Rd, approximately 10 miles upstream from the waterfall.

== See also ==
- List of waterfalls in Washington
