= Tolmie Peak =

Mountain in Washington (state), United States

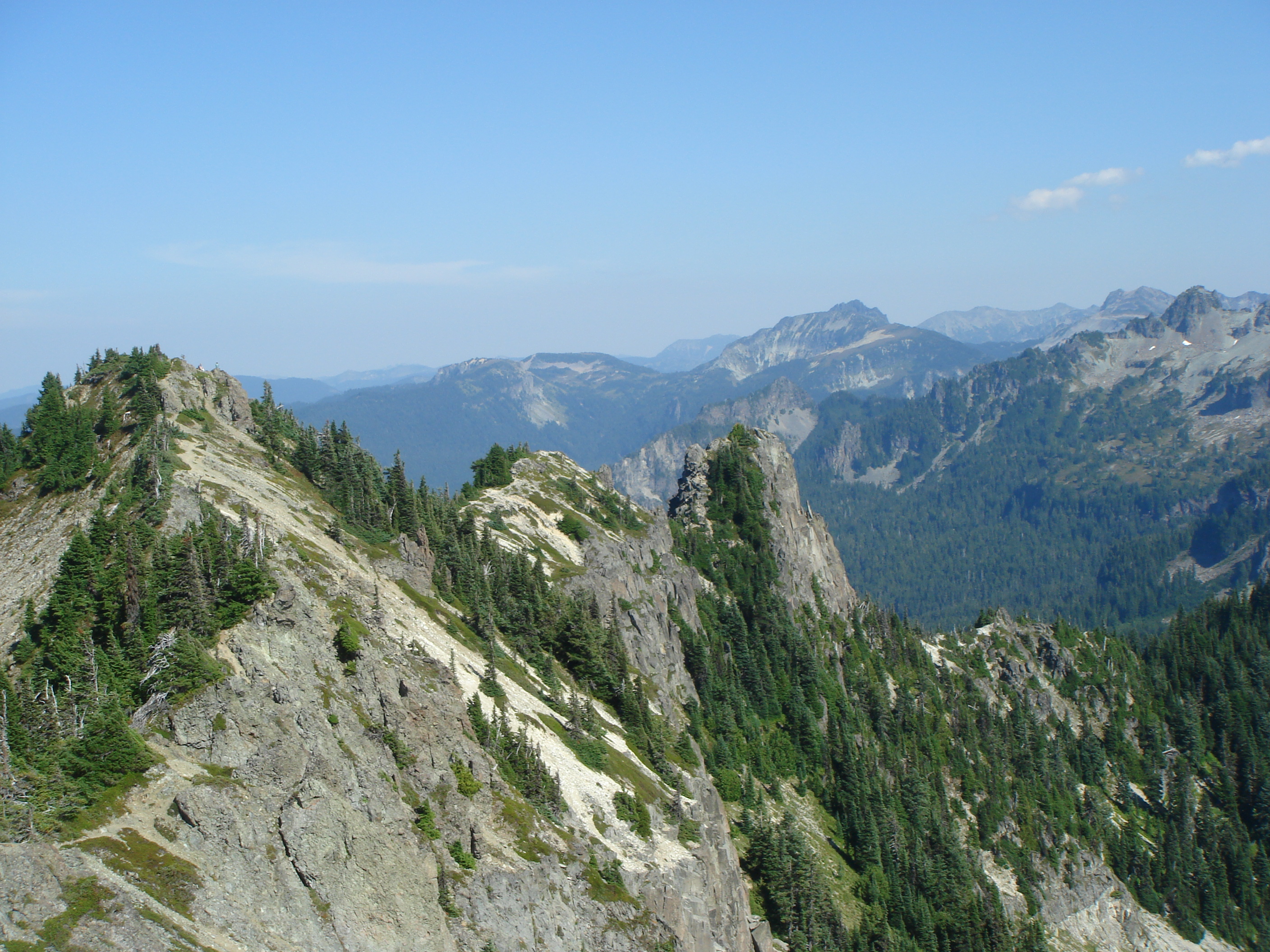
- View along ridgeline from summit

Highest point
- Elevation: 5,920+ ft (1,800+ m) NGVD 29
- Prominence: 760 ft (230 m)
- Coordinates: 46°57′29″N 121°52′38″W

Geography
- Location: Mount Rainier National Park, Pierce County, Washington, U.S.
- Parent range: Cascade Range
- Topo map: USGS Golden Lakes

Tolmie Peak is a 5,920+ -foot (1,800+ m) peak in the Mount Rainier area of the Cascade Range, in the U.S. state of Washington. It is located 2 miles (3.2 km) northwest of Mowich Lake, in the northwest part of Mount Rainier National Park.

Streams that drain the slopes of Tolmie Peak, including Tolmie Creek and Ranger Creek, join the Carbon River, which flows into the Puyallup River and Puget Sound. Just south of Tolmie Peak, in a basin carved by glaciers, lies Eunice Lake. To the northwest is Howard Peak.

Tolmie Peak is named for William Fraser Tolmie. In August 1833, employed by Hudson's Bay Company and stationed at the newly built Fort Nisqually, Tolmie made the first recorded exploration of the Mount Rainier area. Unable to summit Rainier itself, Tolmie and two Indian guides, Lachalet and Nuckalkat, summited one of the snowy peaks near the Mowich River headwaters. Although Tolmie Peak is named for this event, it is not known exactly which peak was climbed.

== See also ==
- Eunice Lake
