= Stevens Pass Ski Area =

Ski area in Washington, United States

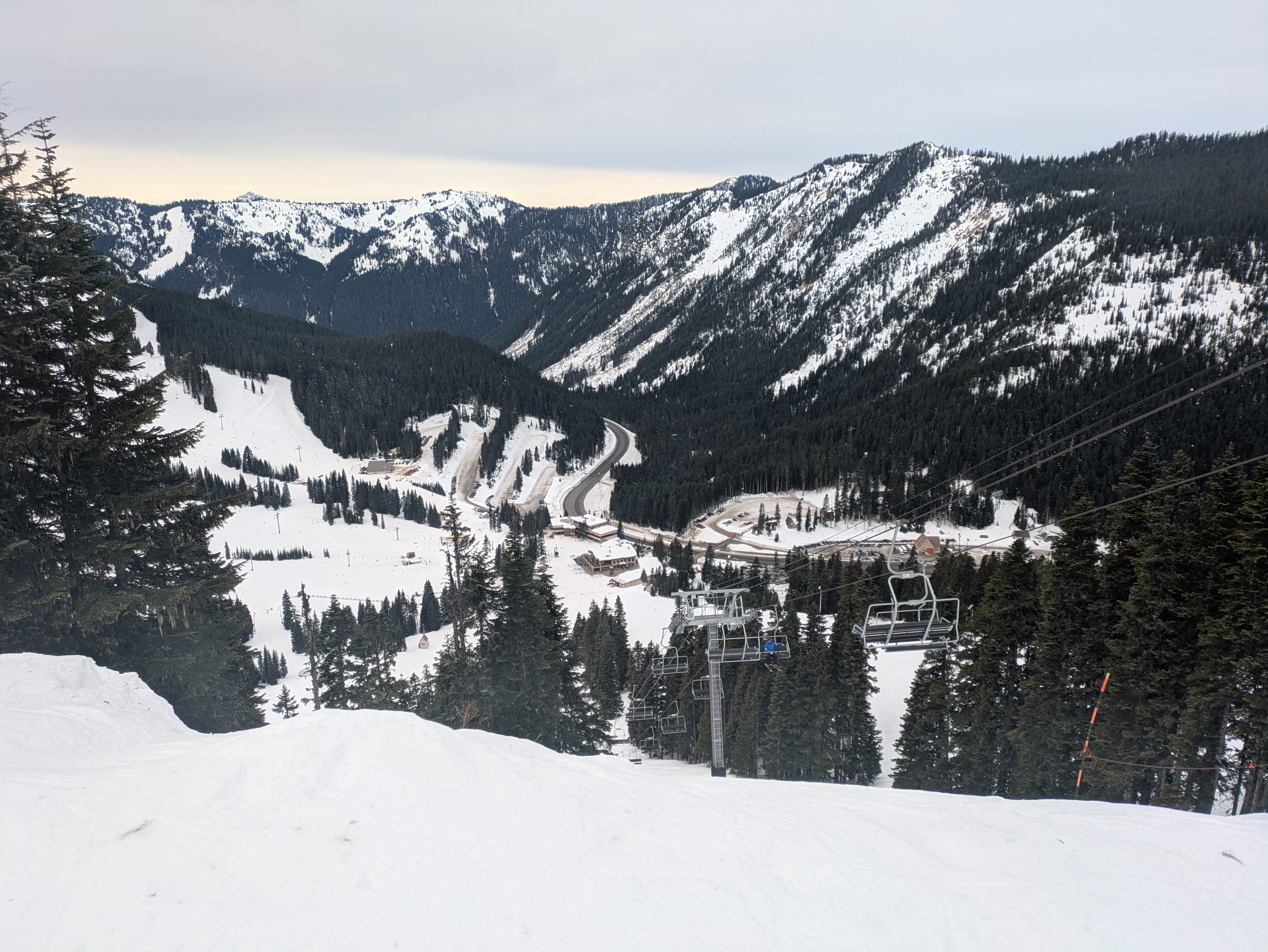
- View of the base area from the top of a chairlift

- Location in Washington Location in the United States
- Location: King County, near Skykomish, Washington, U.S.
- Nearest city: Leavenworth; 37 mi (60 km) east
- Coordinates: 47°44′41″N 121°5′20″W
- Status: Operating
- Opened: 1937
- Owner: Vail Resorts
- Vertical: 1,800 ft (549 m)
- Top elevation: 5,845 ft (1,782 m); Cowboy Mountain; 5,600 ft (1,700 m); Big Chief Mountain
- Base elevation: 4,061 ft (1,238 m) main base area 3,821 ft (1,165 m); Mill Valley
- Skiable area: 1,125 acres (4.55 km^{2})
- Trails: 37: 11% easiest; 54% more difficult; 35% most difficult
- Lift system: 10 chairs
- Lift capacity: 15,763 per hour
- Terrain parks: Yes, 3
- Snowfall: 450 in (38 ft; 1,100 cm)
- Snowmaking: Yes
- Night skiing: Yes
- Website: stevenspass.com

The Stevens Pass Ski Area is a ski area in the Cascade Range of Washington in the United States. It is located at the crest of Stevens Pass at a base elevation of 4,061 feet (1,238 m) above sea level and peak elevation at 5,845 feet (1,782 m). The Mill Valley "backside" of the resort drops to a minimum elevation of 3,821 feet (1,165 m). Total skiable terrain includes 37 major runs covering 1,125 acres (4.55 km^{2}). The ski area opened in 1937 and is accessed via U.S. Route 2, which connects to nearby Leavenworth as well as the Seattle metropolitan area.

== Alpine skiing ==
Stevens Pass offers a variety of alpine ski runs ranging from beginner to advanced. Without lodging at its base, Stevens is a day resort, drawing heavily from the Seattle-Everett metropolitan area, via U.S. Route 2. Night skiing is offered until 10 pm most days (except Mondays and Tuesdays) during mid-season.

The area is divided into front (north and east facing) and back (south facing) sides.

=== Front side ===
From the base area, there is direct access to the chairlifts Daisy, Hogsback, Brooks, Skyline, and Kehr's:

- Kehr's (formerly Big Chief) was upgraded in summer 2023 from a fixed double to a fixed quad, sitting below Big Chief Mountain, providing access to a very consistent cruiser with small bumps on the left side and an ungroomed steep bump slope leading to a valley on the right side. This chair provides access to the backside via an upper lift called Double Diamond.
- Daisy is a beginner's quad lift that offers access to beginner terrain directly in the middle of the ski area. (There is also a conveyor belt (aka "magic carpet") lift in the beginner area at the base of Daisy.)
- Hogsback is a high-speed quad providing access to intermediate runs and some more advanced tree runs, along with the terrain parks.
- Skyline is a high-speed quad that offers the longest intermediate and advanced runs on the front side of the mountain. It is the most difficult front side lift from the base and has much steeper intermediate and black runs.
- Brooks is a high-speed quad lift that primarily provides access to beginner-intermediate terrain with rolling hills, as well as large jumps as part of the advanced terrain park.

There are also 3 higher chairlifts on the front side:

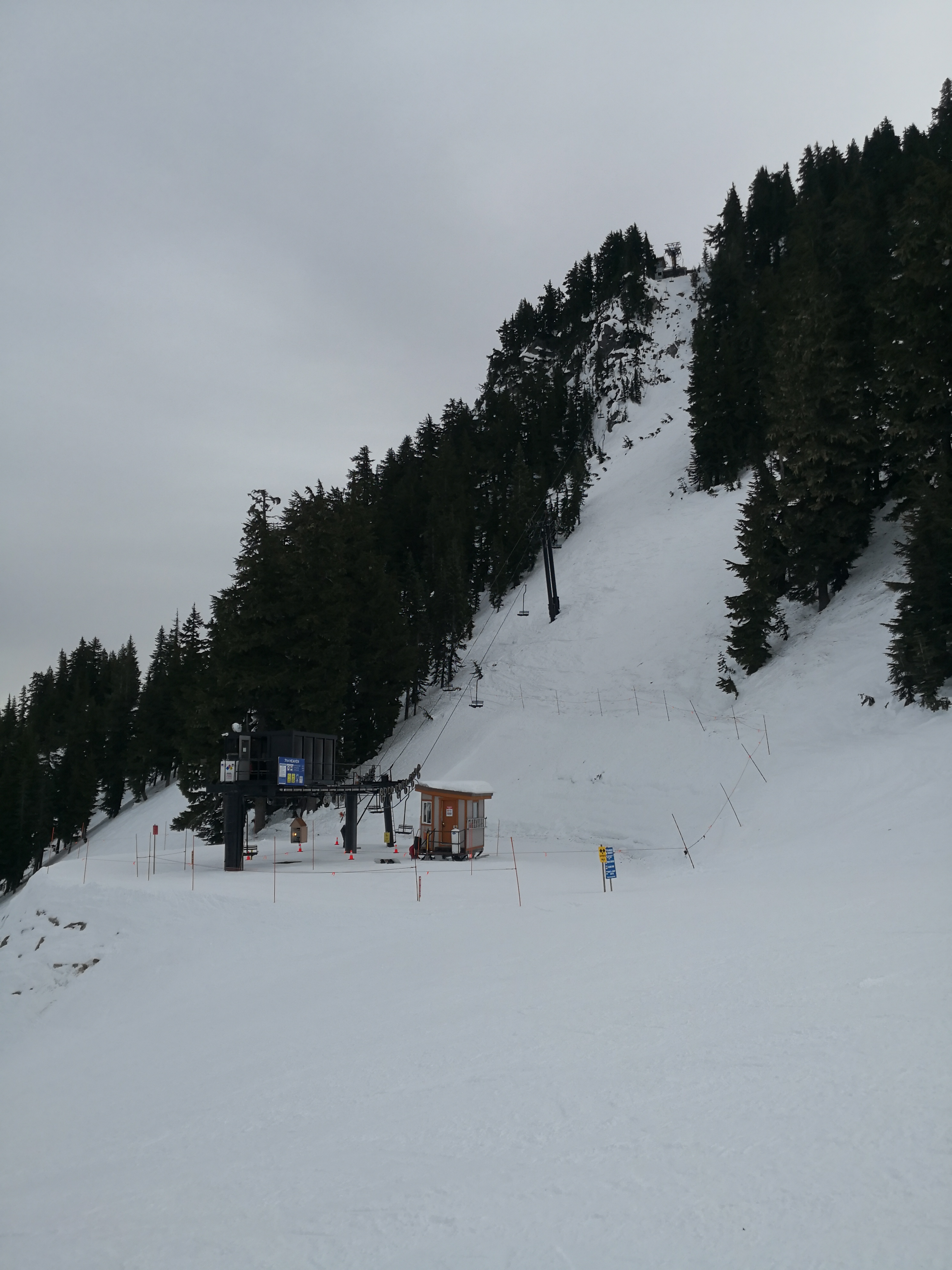
View of the Seventh Heaven lift from its base

- Seventh Heaven is a fixed double experts-only lift that accesses double-black diamond runs and backcountry access near the top of Cowboy Mountain. It is accessed by the Skyline lift and is the steepest lift in North America.
- Tye Mill is a fixed triple that provides access to the backside and to intermediate and advanced runs and is accessed by the Hogsback lift or Seventh Heaven chair.
- Double Diamond is a fixed triple that provides access to the backside and also to Double Diamond, Big Chief Bowl, and Wild Katz, all experts-only extra-steep ungroomed runs. It is accessed by Kehr's Chair.

=== Back side ===
The backside (named Mill Valley) provides a more natural environment with many sparsely treed runs. The backside features two lifts loading from the same immediate area:

- Jupiter Express - a high-speed quad that unloads next to the top of Tye Mill. This lift accesses the most intermediate terrain on the backside, as well as black and double black diamond terrain and tree skiing. It offers the second longest vertical drop of a single chair (about 1350 ft) and the fastest vertical per minute on the mountain.
- Southern Cross - a fixed triple that is the same physical lift as Double Diamond on the frontside. This lift accesses much more steep and advanced terrain and unloads at the top of Double Diamond chair. Southern Cross features the longest vertical drop of Stevens Pass, over 1850 ft. Not recommended for intermediate skiers.

== Cross-country skiing ==
The Stevens Pass Nordic Center located 5 miles east of the pass provides access to 28 km of groomed cross-country ski trails of varying difficulty. The Nordic Center also offers rentals, lessons, and dining.

== History ==
The ski resort was started in the winter of 1937–38 by Don Adams and Bruce Kehr, both passionate skiers who had acquired rights to develop a ski area on Big Chief Mountain. The chambers of commerce for Everett and Wenatchee, who sought to promote the use of the Stevens Pass Highway, also purchased land owned by the Northern Pacific Railroad near the pass and transferred it to the U.S. Forest Service for use by a ski resort. The original lodge was constructed in 1937, burned down in 1939, and was rebuilt the next year by the Civilian Conservation Corps (CCC), a federal New Deal jobs program. By 1963, the Stevens Pass Ski Area had expanded to three chairlifts and twelve rope tows with a ski lodge and ski shop. The Big Chief chairlift was renamed for Kehr in 2009, a year after his death.

In 2011, Harbor Resorts after 35 years of ownership sold Stevens Pass to CNL Lifestyle; operations were turned over to the operator of Mountain High in California. In 2016, CNL sold Stevens Pass to Och-Ziff Capital Management. On August 15, 2018, Vail Resorts completed its acquisition of Stevens Pass. The acquisition had been announced two months prior; Vail planned to include Stevens Pass in its Epic Pass program as well as opening access to Whistler Blackcomb Edge Card holders.

Amid the COVID-19 pandemic, Vail Resorts implemented a pre-reservation requirement to control crowds at Stevens Pass and mandated the use of face coverings and social distancing for the 2020–21 season. The ski area's employee accommodations were also reduced in half to a capacity of 65 people. Several lifts were inoperable for part of the season, which drew criticism from patrons alongside the shortened hours and overcrowding. The restrictions were lifted for the following season, but staffing shortages and high avalanche risk caused only five lifts and 40 percent of terrain to be open, leading to longer lines. An online petition was started on Change.org, which garnered nearly 40,000 signatures in two weeks, and over 80 consumer complaints were submitted to the Washington Attorney General's office. Vail announced discounts for renewing passholders in response to the criticism and the ski area later opened more backside terrain areas.

A new general manager was hired from the Heavenly Mountain Resort in California ahead of the 2022–23 season, which opened with full staffing and additional capacity in employee housing, as well as pay raises.

== Avalanches ==
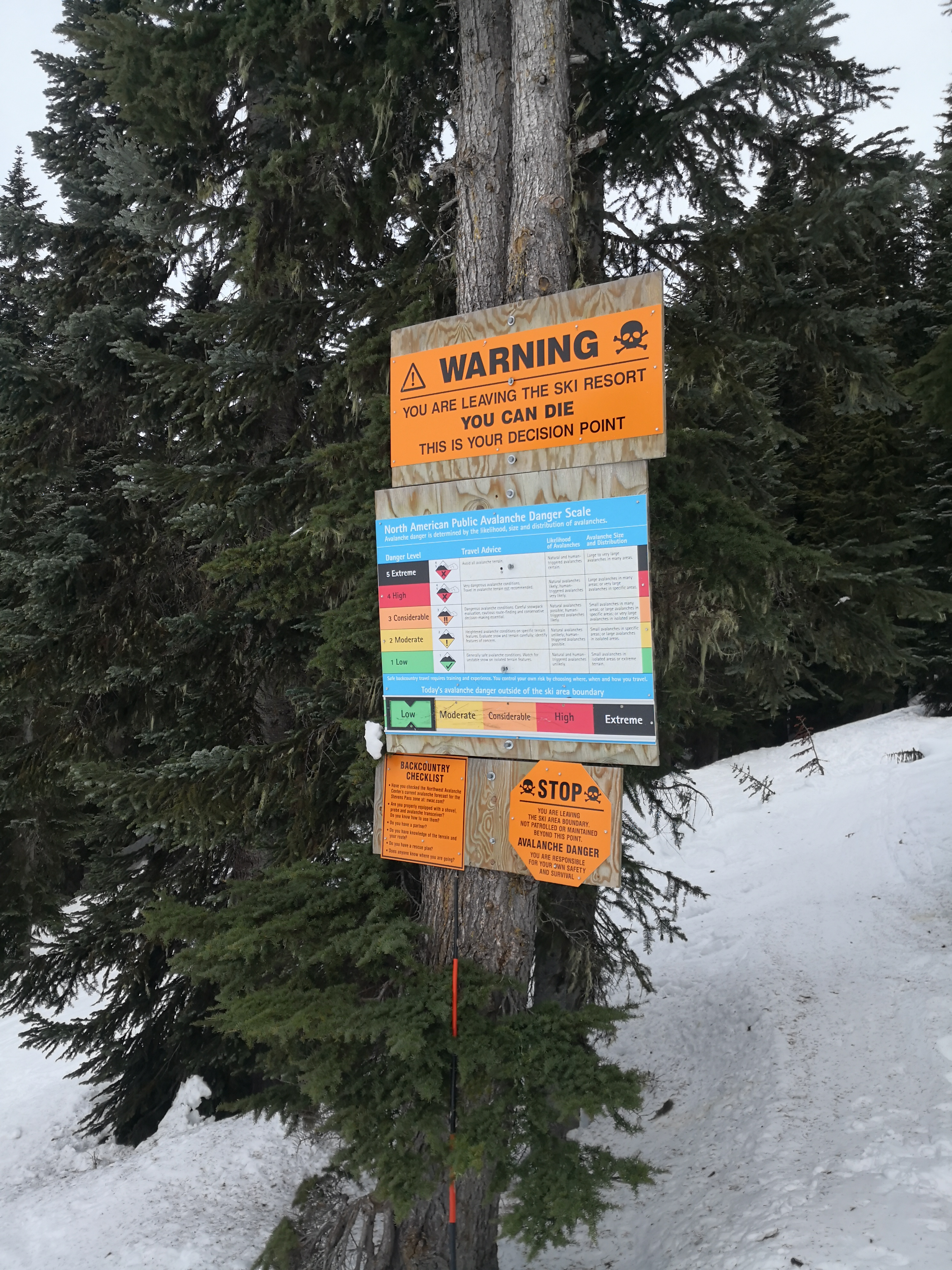
Warning sign at the resort boundary east of the Kehr Chair

On February 19, 2012, a group of 16 experienced skiers skied from Stevens Pass lift system into Tunnel Creek, a nearby uncontrolled backcountry area. Three men, Chris Rudolph, age 30; Johnny Brenan, 41, and Jim Jack, age 46; were killed in a large avalanche.

In 2026, a man was fully buried in an inbounds avalanche. His wife became concerned when his iPhone showed it was stationary and he did not answer the phone. Ski patrol responded after four hours and rescued the man with the help of RECCO technology. He survived despite the estimated 4 to 5 hour burial time.
