= Camp Creek Falls =

Waterfall in Washington state

- Interactive map of Camp Creek Falls
- Location: Lewis County, Washington
- Coordinates: 46°26′55″N 121°50′08″W
- Type: Horsetail
- Total height: 1,554 ft (474 m)
- Number of drops: 1
- Longest drop: 55 ft (17 m)
- Watercourse: Cispus River
- Average flow rate: 10 cu ft/s (0.28 m^{3}/s)

Camp Creek Falls is a 55-foot (17 m) waterfall that flows from Camp Creek on a basin of about 4 square miles (10 km^{2}) and 1,550 feet (470 m) above sea level. The waterfall is located in the U.S. state of Washington, south of U.S. Route 12 and approximately northeast of Mount St. Helens National Volcanic Monument.

The creek empties into the Cispus River. While flow is reduced in the late season, Camp Creek Falls is a perennial, two-tier drop. A hiking trail leads from a parking area to the falls.

== Location ==
Camp Creek Falls is located in the White Pass-Cowlitz River Valley, 9.5 miles (15.3 km) south of Randle, Washington along Randle-Trout Lake Road (NF-23). A trail to the falls crosses over Camp Creek. The hiking path passes through a conifer hardwood forest along a steep side slope on both sides of the creek.

== See also ==
- List of geographic features in Lewis County, Washington
- List of waterfalls in Washington
