= Eightmile Creek Falls =

Waterfall

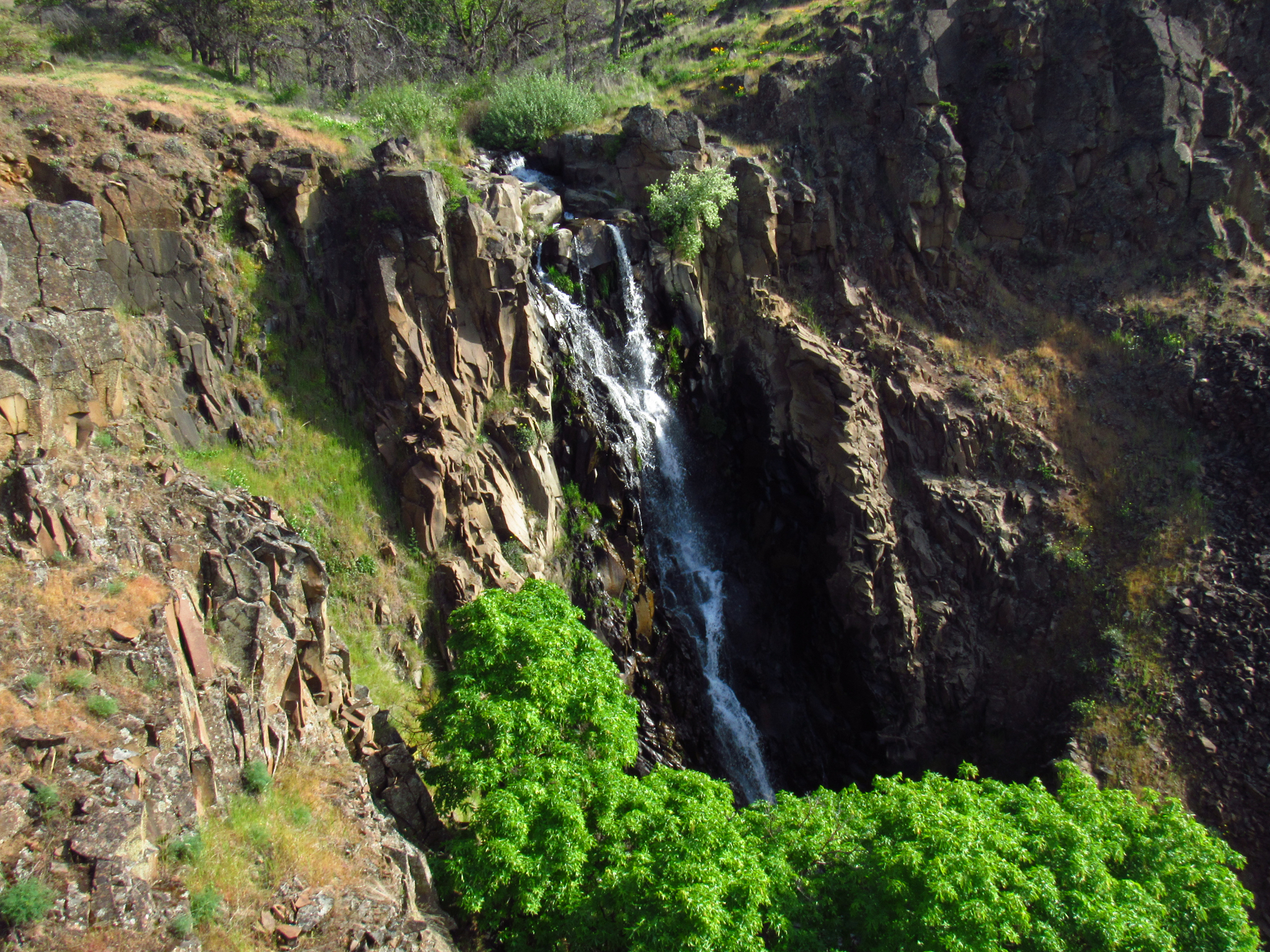
- Eightmile Creek Creek Falls
- Interactive map of Eightmile Creek Falls
- Location: Klickitat County, Washington
- Coordinates: 45.65875°N 121.08727°W
- Type: Steep Cascade
- Total height: 470 ft (140 m)
- Watercourse: Eightmile Creek

Eightmile Creek Falls is a waterfall that flows from Eightmile Creek, just before it washes into the Columbia River, approximately 450 feet above sea level, located in the U.S. state of Washington. Shortly downstream Eightmile Creek takes a sharp turn around a canyon bend before emptying in the Columbia River.

Eightmile Creek is located north of State Route 14 East of Horesthief Lake along the Columbia River Gorge. There's a viewpoint just east of the Access Road off Route 14. Eightmile Creek Falls spills over rimrock into a narrow slot canyon that becomes dry in the late season.

== See also ==
- List of waterfalls in Washington
