= Sheep Creek Falls =

Waterfall

- Interactive map of Sheep Creek Falls
- Location: Columbia County, Washington
- Coordinates: 46.1957°N 117.62422°W
- Total height: 3,853 ft (1,174 m)
- Number of drops: 1
- Longest drop: 20 ft (6.1 m)
- Watercourse: Sheep Creek

Sheep Creek Falls is a waterfall that flows from Sheep Creek, just before it joins the Tucannon River, in the hills of the Umatilla National Forest, located in the Wenaha–Tucannon Wilderness of the U.S. state of Washington.

Sheep Creek Falls is located in the southeast corner of the state on the border between Columbia and Garfield Counties. U.S. Route 12 is to the West. Access is through the Tucannon trailhead at the junction of Tucannon River and Sheep Creek.

== Access ==
Sheep Creek Falls is accessed through a trail that parallels Sheep Creek. The trail is reached by following upstream Tucannon River up to a bridge that crosses over Sheep Creek and headed north upstream of the Creek. Sheep Creek Falls is approximately 55 miles East of the city of Dayton and 28 miles south of Pomeroy. The last 7 -8 miles of Tucannon River Road are unpaved through Ladybug Campground and leading to the Tucannon Trail Head. The trail to Sheep Creek Falls is a well-maintained trail in the heart of the Wenaha-Tucannon Wilderness.

== See also ==
- List of waterfalls in Washington
