= Curly Creek Falls =

- Interactive map of Curly Creek Falls
- Location: Skamania County, Washington
- Coordinates: 46.058169°N 121.97203°W
- Type: Tiered plunges
- Total height: 1,554 ft (474 m)
- Number of drops: 2
- Longest drop: 86 ft (26 m)
- Watercourse: Lewis River
- Average flow rate: 100 cu ft/s (2.8 m^{3}/s)

Curly Creek Falls, also called Curly/Miller Falls is a 86-foot (26 m) waterfall that flows from Curly Creek just west of the Swift Reservoir, approximately 1150 feet above sea level, located in the U.S. state of Washington. Shortly downstream Curly Creek empties into Lewis River. While flow may run dry in the late season, Curly Creek Falls is unique in having two natural basalt arches apparent at the top of the waterfall. Curly Creek Falls is located north of Interstate 84 in the heart of the Mount St. Helens National Volcanic Monument. A hiking trail leads from a parking area to the falls. The area around the waterfall is surrounded by moss-covered rocks and a forest of old-growth Douglas fir and hemlock.

== Location ==
Curly Creek Falls is located in the Lewis River Region in Southwest Washington, 24.5 miles north of Stabler, Washington and the same distance East of Cougar, Washington. It is located at the junction Curly Creek road (NF-51) and Lewis River Rd (NF-90). Access is found across the road to a parking area and the trailhead on the south shore of Lewis River. After crossing over Curly Creek, the trail hikes through a mixed conifer hardwood forest along a steep side slope on both sides of the watercourse before ending approximately 20 feet of the waterfall. Access road is found East of the NF-51 and NF-90 fork that crosses over Lewis River for access to the north shore towards Swift Reservoir.

== Geology ==
Curly Creek runs down lava tubes and a basalt accident that makes the waterfall. Two basal arches are noticeable above the top of the waterfall, remnants of lava flow. In high flow of the spring, the first arch may be buried under the water flow. Just upstream of the arches, the bedrock has a unique hollow cavity recognized as a keeper hole for those who visit the river for canyoning and rappelling the waterfall. The silo hole can be fully dry in later conditions of the year.

== See also ==
- List of waterfalls in Washington
