= Thunder Mountain (Wenatchee Mountains) =

Mountain in Chelan and King counties in Washington, United States

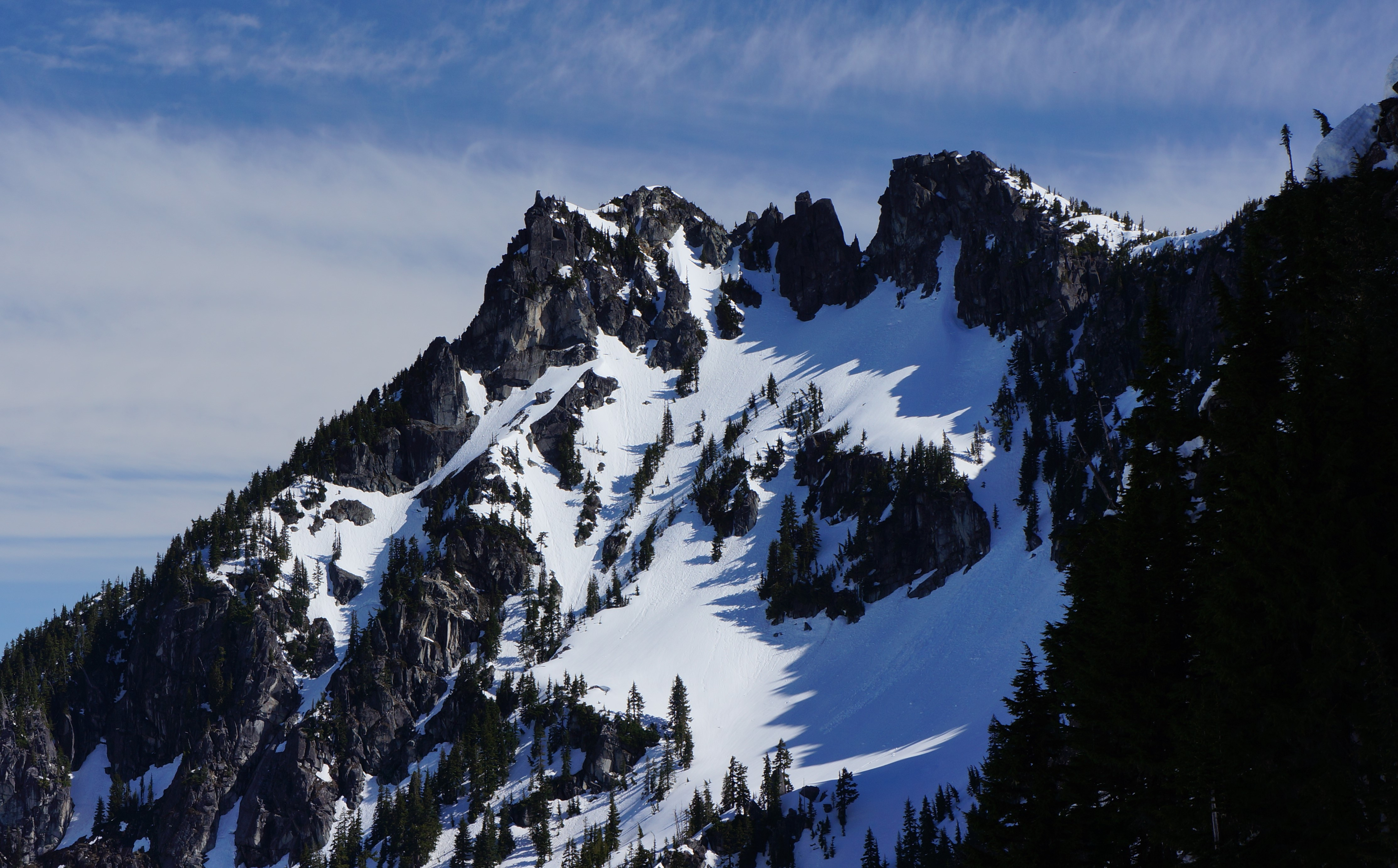
- Southwest aspect from Surprise Gap

Highest point
- Elevation: 6,556 ft (1,998 m)
- Prominence: 276 ft (84 m)
- Parent peak: Nimbus Mountain (6,711 ft)
- Isolation: 0.55 mi (0.89 km)
- Coordinates: 47°39′21″N 121°07′55″W

Geography
- Location within Washington (state) Location within the United States
- Country: United States
- State: Washington
- County: King / Chelan
- Protected area: Alpine Lakes Wilderness
- Parent range: North Wenatchee Mountains; Cascade Range
- Topo map: USGS Scenic

Geology
- Rock age: Late Cretaceous
- Rock type: Tonalitic plutons

Climbing
- Easiest route: Hiking West Ridge

Thunder Mountain is a 6,556-foot (1,998-metre) mountain summit located above the eastern shore of Glacier Lake, on the common border of King County and Chelan County in Washington state. It's part of the Wenatchee Mountains, which are a subset of the Cascade Range, and is situated in the Alpine Lakes Wilderness, on land managed by Mount Baker-Snoqualmie National Forest. Precipitation runoff from the mountain drains west into Surprise Creek, or east into tributaries of Icicle Creek. The nearest higher neighbor is Nimbus Mountain, 0.56 mi (0.90 km) to the northeast, and Surprise Mountain is set 0.88 mi (1.42 km) to the southwest. The Pacific Crest Trail skirts this peak as it passes between Thunder Mountain and Spark Plug Mountain.

== Climate ==
Thunder Mountain is located in the marine west coast climate zone of western North America. Weather fronts originating in the Pacific Ocean travel northeast toward the Cascade Mountains. As fronts approach, they are forced upward by the peaks of the Cascade Range, causing them to drop their moisture in the form of rain or snow onto the Cascades (Orographic lift). As a result, the west side of the Cascades experiences high precipitation, especially during the winter months in the form of snowfall. Because of maritime influence, snow tends to be wet and heavy, resulting in avalanche danger. During winter months, weather is usually cloudy, but due to high pressure systems over the Pacific Ocean that intensify during summer months, there is often little or no cloud cover during the summer. The months of July through September offer the most favorable weather for viewing or climbing this peak.

== Geology ==
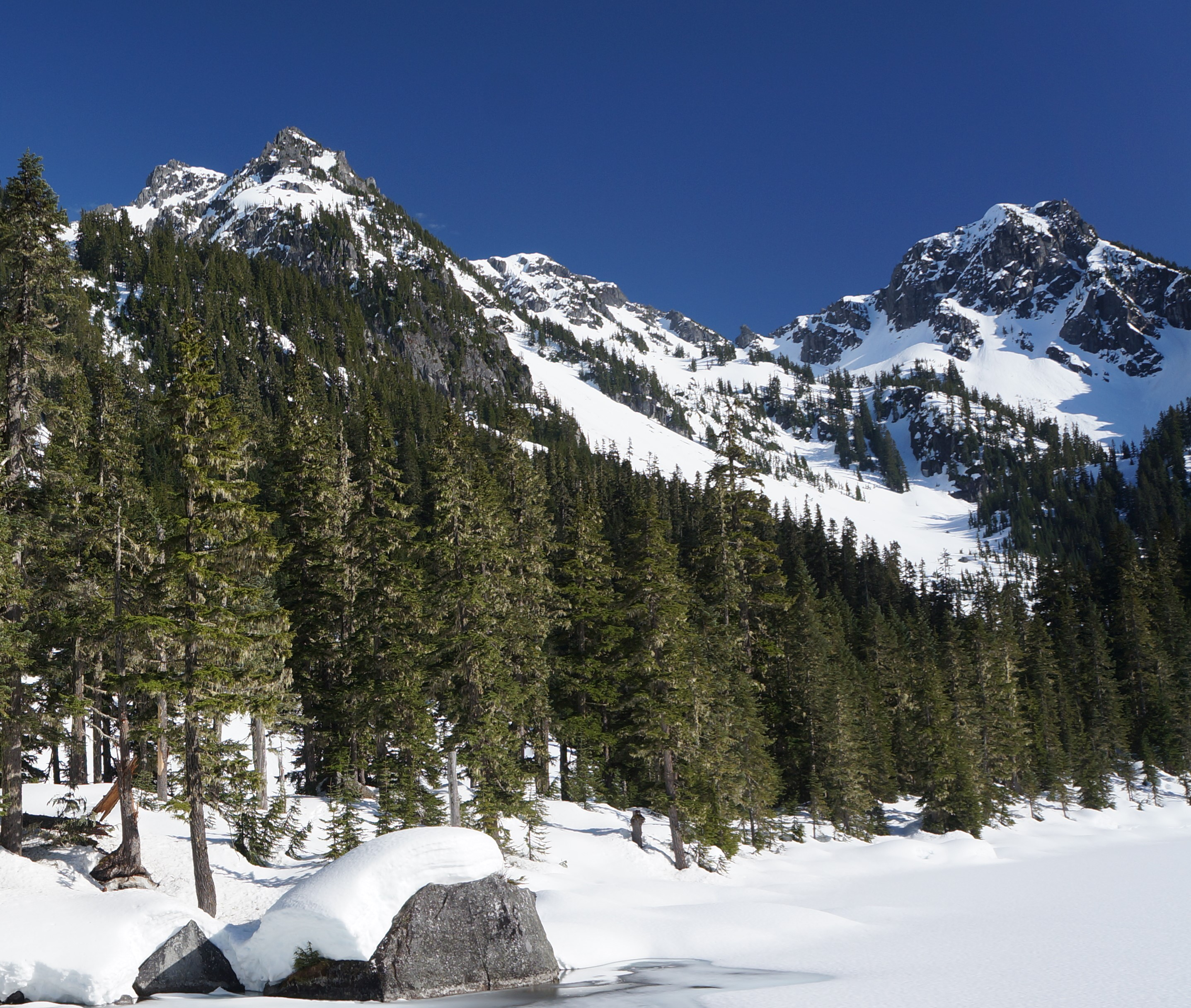
Nimbus (left) and Thunder (right)

The Alpine Lakes Wilderness features some of the most rugged topography in the Cascade Range with craggy peaks and ridges, deep glacial valleys, and granite walls spotted with over 700 mountain lakes. Geological events occurring many years ago created the diverse topography and drastic elevation changes over the Cascade Range leading to the various climate differences.

The history of the formation of the Cascade Mountains dates back millions of years ago to the late Eocene Epoch. With the North American Plate overriding the Pacific Plate, episodes of volcanic igneous activity persisted. In addition, small fragments of the oceanic and continental lithosphere called terranes created the North Cascades about 50 million years ago.

During the Pleistocene period dating back over two million years ago, glaciation advancing and retreating repeatedly scoured and shaped the landscape. The last glacial retreat in the Alpine Lakes area began about 14,000 years ago and was north of the Canada–US border by 10,000 years ago. The U-shaped cross section of the river valleys is a result of that recent glaciation. Uplift and faulting in combination with glaciation have been the dominant processes which have created the tall peaks and deep valleys of the Alpine Lakes Wilderness area.

== See also ==
- List of mountains of Washington (state)
- List of peaks of the Alpine Lakes Wilderness
