= Panther Creek Falls =

Waterfall in Washington (state), United States

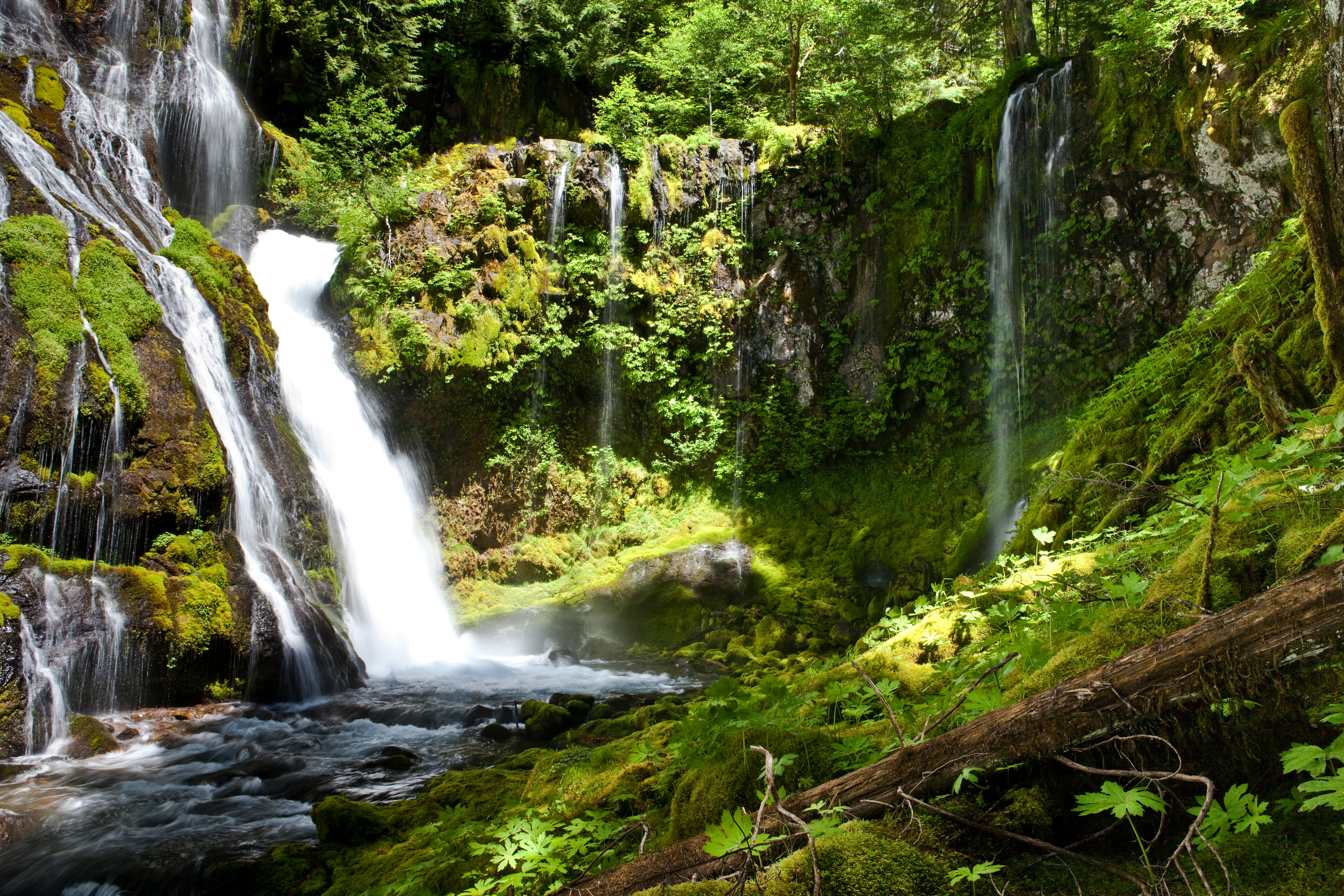
- A view of Panther Creek Falls from ground level
- Interactive map of Panther Creek Falls
- Location: Skamania County, Washington
- Coordinates: 45.86735°N 121.82755°W
- Type: Tiered Horsetail
- Elevation: 1,679 feet (512 m)
- Total height: 130 feet (40 m)
- Number of drops: 2
- Longest drop: 102 feet (31 m)
- Average flow rate: 150 cu ft/s (4.2 m^{3}/s)

Panther Creek Falls is a 130-foot (40 m) waterfall on Panther Creek in the Wind River Valley in Skamania County, Washington. The waterfall consists of two drops, with the largest at a height of 102 feet (31 m). The waterfall is perennial.

== Trail ==
The waterfall and the creek which leads up to it are accessible by a trail maintained by the Forest Service. In addition to the maintained trail, a viewing deck was constructed to the right at a Y in the trail where you can see the main, horsetail portion of the waterfall. The trail continues down to the left at the Y for those who wish to see the final 30-foot (9.1 m) drop.

== Structure ==
The waterfall is produced by Panther Creek approaching a cliff and then sharply making a turn. Some of the water rushes too quickly and falls over the side prematurely at the bend, but the majority of the water follows the creek until it reaches a natural trough which then drops off. At the dropoff, the horsetail begins the first tier of the waterfall, which drops 102 feet (31 m). After this, a 30-foot (9.1 m) drop concludes the waterfall and the creek continues.
