= Whinnimic Falls =

Waterfall in Washington (state), United States

Coordinates: 47.4837°N 121.2828°W

- Interactive map of Whinnimic Falls
- Location: Kittitas County, Washington, United States
- Type: Plunge
- Total height: 350 feet (110 m)
- Number of drops: 1
- Total width: 15 feet (4.6 m)
- Watercourse: Unnamed

Whinnimic Falls is a waterfall in the headwaters of Lemah Creek in the Alpine Lakes Wilderness Area. It is set in a narrow valley below Lemah Mountain. The falls are one of two in the valley, the other being the smaller Upper Lemah Valley Falls. Whinnimic Falls plunges about 350 feet (110 m) off a vertical cliff, onto a valley floor dotted with ponds and grassy meadows. The stream heads in two tarns and the remains of a small glacier.

The name "Whinnimic Falls" was mentioned in the red Cascade Alpine Guide by Fred Beckey. The origin of the name is unknown.
