= Tye River (Washington) =

- Location of the mouth of the Tye River in Washington

Location
- Country: United States
- State: Washington
- County: King

Physical characteristics
- Source: Cascade Range
  - location: Stevens Pass
  - coordinates: 47°44′28″N 121°5′12″W
- Mouth: South Fork Skykomish River
  - coordinates: 47°42′18″N 121°18′21″W
- Length: 11 mi (18 km)
- Basin size: 81 sq mi (210 km^{2})
- Discharge
  - location: near Skykomish
  - average: 305 cu ft/s (8.6 m^{3}/s)
  - minimum: 50 cu ft/s (1.4 m^{3}/s)
  - maximum: 1,500 cu ft/s (42 m^{3}/s)

The Tye River is a river in the U.S. state of Washington. It rises near Stevens Pass in the Cascade Mountains and flows west, joining the Foss River to form the South Fork Skykomish River. Its waters eventually empty into Puget Sound near Everett via the Skykomish River and Snohomish River. U.S. Route 2 follows the river's entire length. A BNSF Railway line follows most of the river except near the pass where the tracks use the Cascade Tunnel. Powerlines run by the Bonneville Power Administration (BPA) follow the Tye River west of Tunnel Creek.

Most of the Tye River drainage basin is within Mount Baker-Snoqualmie National Forest.

The Tye River is considered the continuation of the South Fork Skykomish River above the Foss River confluence. However, the true source of the South Fork Skykomish, in terms of streamflow is not the Tye River but the Rapid River, a tributary of the Beckler River, which in turn is a tributary of the South Fork Skykomish.

The Tye River is named for W.H. Tye (or William Francis Tye), a surveyor for the Great Northern Railway who laid out the rail grade to Stevens Pass.

== Course ==
The Tye River originates on the west side of the crest of the North Cascades on Cowboy Mountain at Stevens Pass. It flows west, then southwest, collecting numerous small tributary streams. At 9.2 mi (14.8 km) upstream from the Tye's mouth, near the Cascade Tunnel's western portal, Tunnel Creek joins the river. U.S. Route 2 makes a hairpin turn in the valley of Tunnel Creek. The Tye River then turns more directly west. It collects Surprise Creek and its tributary Scenic Creek near Scenic. Deception Creek joins near Deception Falls, 6.2 mi (10.0 km) above the mouth of the Tye. Scenic, Surprise, and Deception creeks all join from the south. Below Deception Creek the Tye River is joined by Martin Creek from the north. Then, 4.5 mi (7.2 km) upstream from its mouth, the Tye falls over Alpine Falls. Below the waterfall the Tye River is joined by Carroll Creek and Alpine Creek from the south. The BPA powerline crosses the Tye River 3.2 mi (5.1 km) above the river's mouth. A couple miles east of Skykomish the Foss River, flowing from the south, joins the Tye River, forming the South Fork Skykomish River.

== History ==
The Great Northern Railway built the train tracks today owned by BNSF. The railroad tracks originally followed the Tye River to Stevens Pass, which it crossed via a number of switchbacks. The first Cascade Tunnel was built at Wellington, just west of the pass. After the Wellington avalanche disaster of 1910 the Great Northern changed the town's name from Wellington, which had become associated with the disaster, to Tye, after the river. The town was abandoned after the second Cascade Tunnel was built in 1929.

== Natural history ==
The upper Tye River flows through a steep, narrow, and densely forested valley. Below Surprise Creek the Tye's valley alternately widens and narrows. There are dense mixed deciduous and conifer forests in the valley bottoms and thick conifer forests on the valley sides. Much of the lower elevation forests have been logged at least once. Old growth forests are founded mainly along the higher tributaries.

Above Deception Creek the Tye River has a steep gradient and a confined channel, resulting in a nearly continuous series of steep cascades and small waterfalls. Downstream, near its mouth, the Tye's gradient lessens and its channel widens. The valley becomes more broad and flat. The river becomes somewhat braided in this stretch, with numerous channel splits. There are many logs and other types of large woody debris in this part of the river, contributing to excellent salmon habitat. The final mile of the Tye has a steeper gradient with cascades alternating with deep pools.

Nearly all the Tye River's tributaries are high mountains streams with steep gradients. Some entering the Tye's valley from hanging valleys, plunging down high waterfalls.

The Tye River is used by chinook and coho salmon. Adults migrate upstream as far as Alpine Falls. Spawning occurs mostly in the mainstem river. Some coho spawn in the lower parts of a few tributary streams such as Alpine Creek. Juvenile salmon rear throughout the accessible waters of the river basin. No anadromous fish are found above Alpine Falls as it is a total barrier to fish migration. Sunset Falls on the South Fork Skykomish River, below the mouth of the Tye River, is also a total barrier to fish migration. All anadrmous fish above Sunset Falls, which includes the entire Tye River basin, are present only as a result of a trap and haul operation initiated in 1958 by the Washington Department of Fisheries. Between July and December fish are trapped below the falls, trucked above, and returned to the South Fork Skykomish.

About 125 mi (201 km) of roads have been built in the Tye River basin, resulting in a road density approaching and in places surpassing the threshold where damage to the watershed may occur through road effects on slope hydrology and mass wasting. The Martin Creek and Beckler Peak roads present the greatest hazard to streams. Winter sanding of U.S. Highway 2 is a chronic contributor of fine sediment to the Tye River. Each year 2,500- 7,000 cubic yards of sand are applied to the highway. It is not known how much enters the Tye River. If just 1% does the result is equivalent to a small landslide each year. Increased sediment is a concern because it damages salmon spawning habitat.

== Tributaries ==
Tributaries of the Tye River are listed below, from mouth to source. Tributaries of tributaries are marked by multiple bullet points. Many streams have no name and are labeled "Unnamed". This list is not exhaustive.

- Alpine Creek
- Carroll Creek
- Martin Creek
  - Unnamed
    - Jakes Lake
  - Kelly Creek
  - Unnamed
    - Embro Lake
- Deception Creek
  - Sawyer Creek
  - Fisher Creek
    - Unnamed
      - Ptarmigan Lake
    - Fisher Lake
- Unnamed
  - Deception Lakes
- Surprise Creek
  - Scenic Screek
  - Unnamed
    - Spark Plug Lake
  - Surprise Lake
    - Glacier Lake
- Tunnel Creek

== See also ==
- List of rivers of Washington (state)
