= Spray Falls =

Waterfall in Washington (state), United States

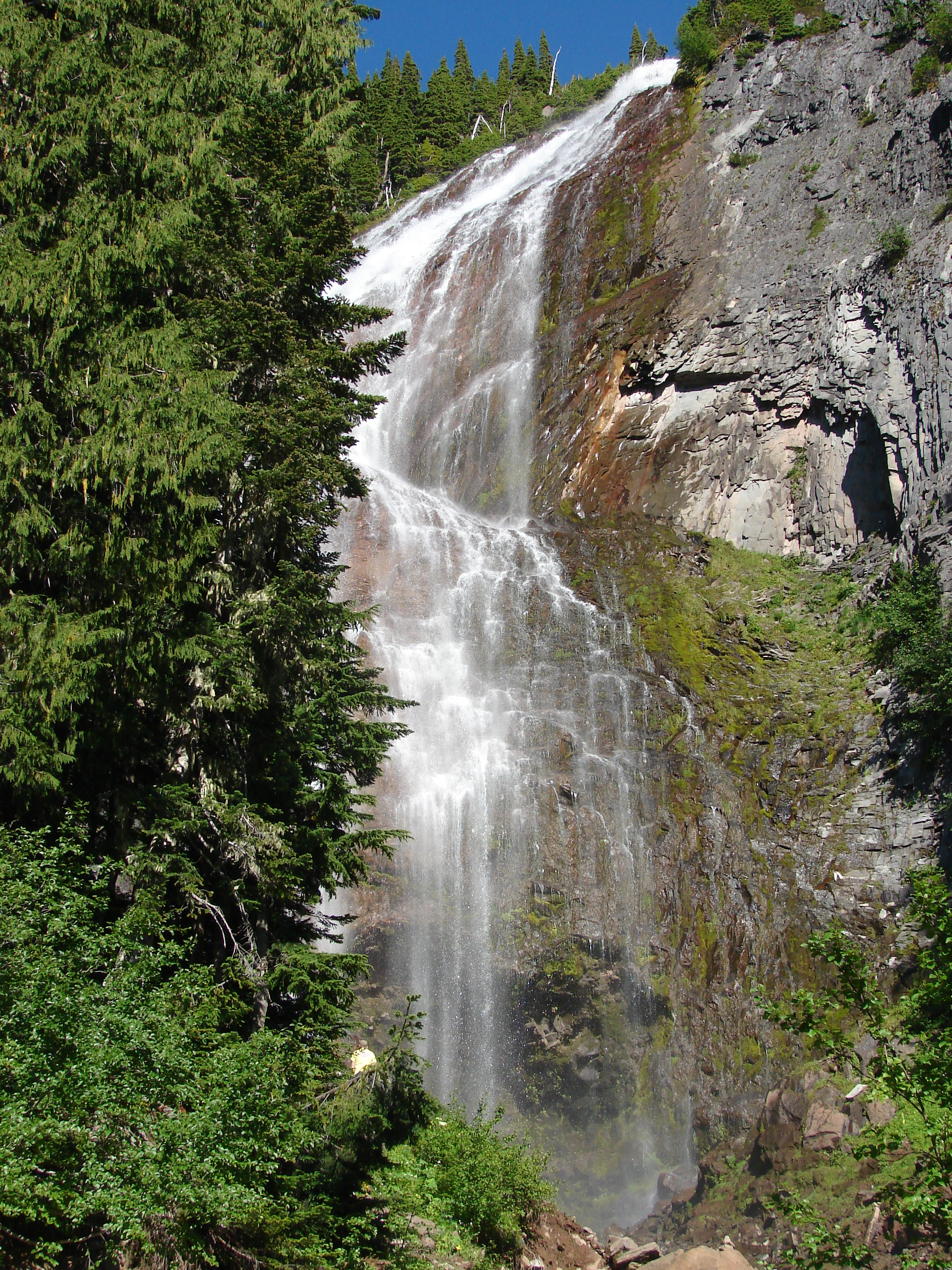
- Interactive map of Spray Falls
- Location: Mount Rainier National Park, Pierce County, Washington, United States
- Coordinates: 46°54′56″N 121°50′32″W
- Type: Veiling Horsetail
- Total height: 354 feet (108 m)
- Number of drops: 1
- Total width: 100 feet (30 m)
- Run: 180 feet (55 m)
- Watercourse: Spray Creek

Spray Falls is a waterfall in the Mount Rainier National Park in Pierce County, Washington. The falls are fed by Spray Creek, which is a tributary of the Puyallup River. The falls drop about 354 feet (108 m) into a talus slope in a vailed horsetail form about 100 feet (30 m) wide.
