= Stevens Pass =

Mountain pass through the Cascade Mountains, Washington, United States

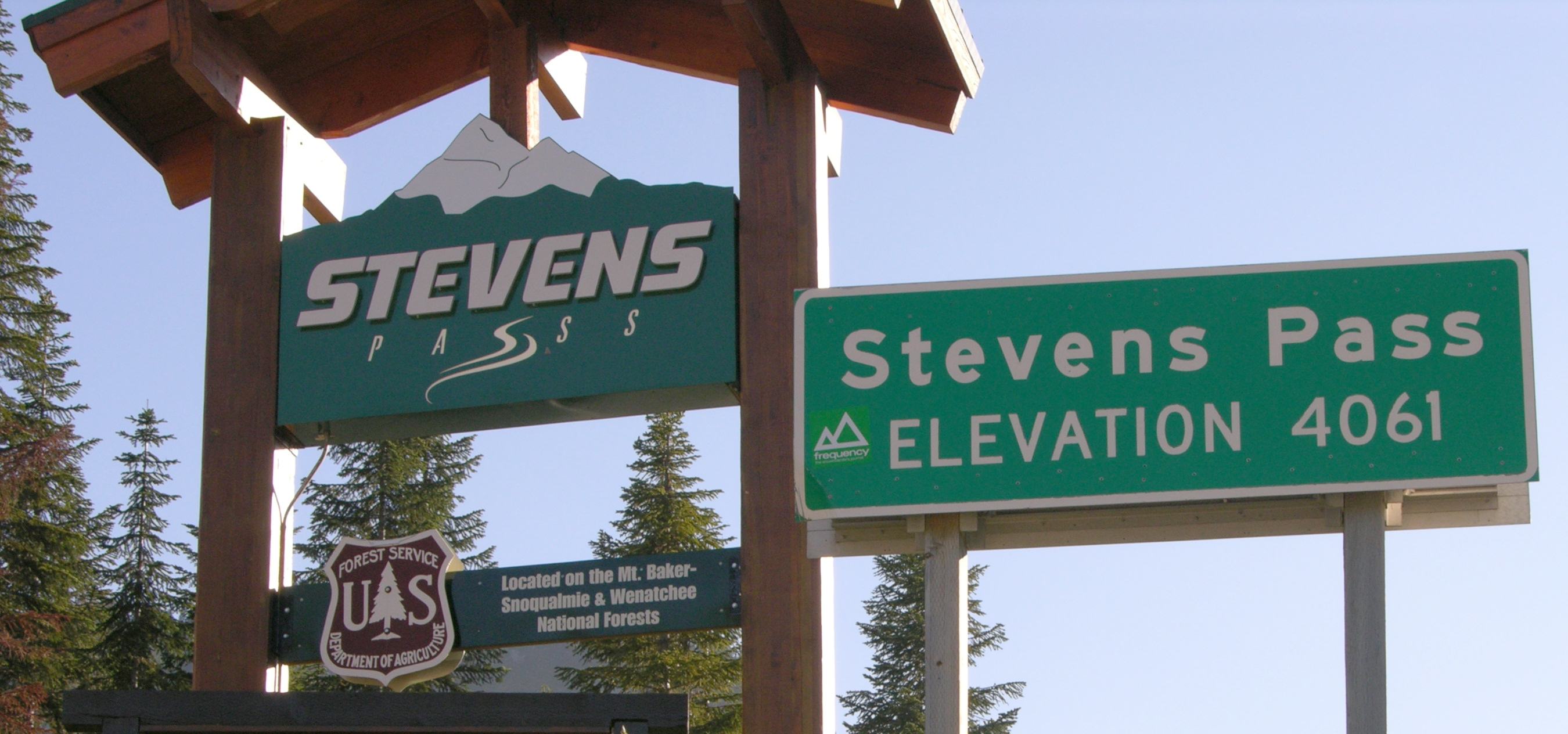
- Interactive map of Stevens Pass
- Elevation: 4,061 ft (1,238 m)
- Traversed by: U.S. Route 2

Location
- Location: Chelan / King counties, Washington, United States
- Range: Cascades
- Coordinates: 47°44.7′N 121°5.6′W

Stevens Pass (elevation 4,061 ft (1,238 m)) is a mountain pass through the Cascade Mountains located at the border of King County and Chelan County in Washington, United States. U.S. Route 2 travels over the pass, reaching a maximum elevation of 4,061 feet (1,238 m). The Pacific Crest Trail crosses the highway at Stevens Pass. The BNSF Railway's Cascade Tunnel lies 1,180 feet (400 m) below the pass summit.

The pass is near Stevens Pass Ski Area, which is on Cowboy Mountain and Big Chief Mountain.

== History ==
Archeological evidence suggests the some indigenous peoples built pit houses around modern-day Stevens Pass, sheltering there during the winter.

Stevens Pass is named after John Frank Stevens, the first non-indigenous person to discover it. Native Americans familiar with the area knew of the pass, although very little is known about Native American routes through the mountains. Hubert C. Ward, exploring the area for the Northern Pacific Railway in 1872, heard from some Native Americans that there was a low pass at the head of Nason Creek, a tributary of the Wenatchee River, which led to one of the sources of the Skykomish River. Albert Bowman Rogers of the Great Northern Railway, learned from Native Americans in 1887 that the Skykomish River and Nason Creek had sources close to one another but that neither natives nor whites visited the Nason Creek area. Neither Ward nor Rogers had time to fully explore the area.

In 1890, Stevens conducted a thorough survey for the Great Northern, located the pass, and determined it to be the best suited for a railway crossing of the North Cascades. He wrote that there was no indication that the pass was used — there was no sign of any trails, blazes, campsites, or old campfires, for at least ten miles (16 km) in either direction and that the area was thickly forested and covered with almost impenetrable brush. Stevens wrote, "the region promised nothing to the prospector, while Indians and Whites crossing the mountains used either Snoqualmie on the south or the Indian Pass on the north."

Stevens had also charted Marias Pass in northwestern Montana, on the Continental Divide near Glacier National Park.

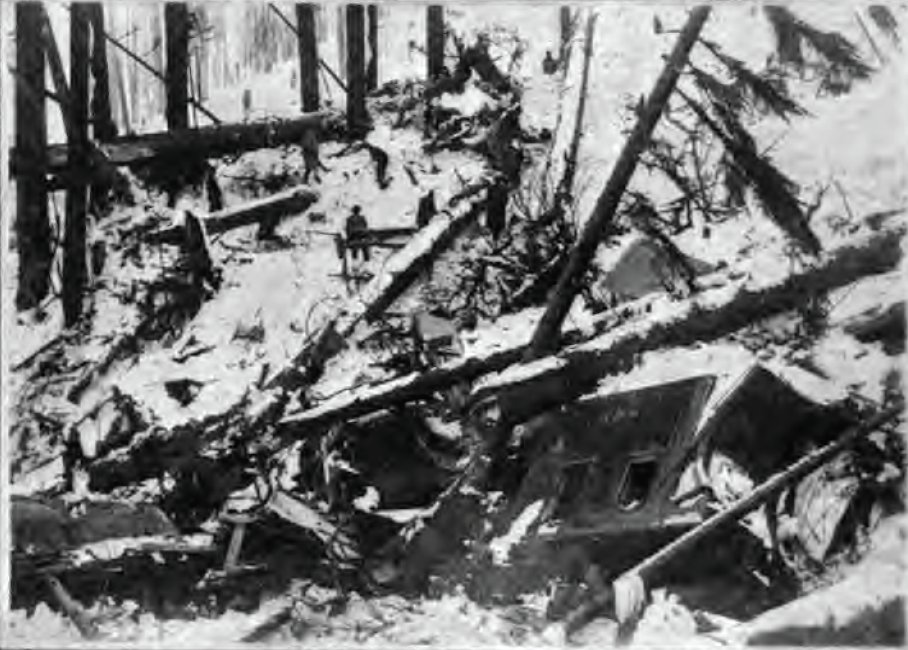
Debris — including wrecked train cars — resulting from the Wellington Avalanche.

== Notable avalanches ==
On February 23, 1910, the two Great Northern Railway trains, the "Seattle Express" local passenger train No. 25 and Fast Mail train No. 27, were stalled on the tracks at the Cascade Tunnel Station on Stevens Pass because of a heavy snow storm and avalanches. Then on March 1, six days later, another avalanche pushed both trains 150 feet (46 m) down into the Tye River Valley, thus burying the train cars in snow and debris. The Wellington Disaster killed ninety-six people – thirty-five passengers and sixty-one railroad employees – which made the Wellington avalanche one of the worst train disasters in United States history.

Over a century later, an avalanche occurred on February 19, 2012 near Tunnel Creek Canyon Road, killing three of four experienced backcountry skiers, including the Stevens Pass Ski Area's marketing director. Professional skier Elyse Saugstad, who was wearing an avalanche airbag backpack, survived after tumbling down for more than 2,000 feet (600 m).

== Climate ==
Stevens Pass experiences a maritime-influenced alpine subarctic climate (Köppen Dsc), with short, mild, dry summers and extremely heavy winter snowfall.

The following chart includes climate data for the Stevens Pass (SNOTEL) weather station from January 1, 1991, to December 31, 2020.

Climate data for Stevens Pass, Washington, 1991–2020 normals, 1939–1994 extremes: 3950ft (1204m)
Month	Jan	Feb	Mar	Apr	May	Jun	Jul	Aug	Sep	Oct	Nov	Dec	Year
Record high °F (°C)	53 (12)	53 (12)	70 (21)	71 (22)	83 (28)	91 (33)	95 (35)	91 (33)	85 (29)	72 (22)	56 (13)	50 (10)	95 (35)
Mean daily maximum °F (°C)	29.2 (−1.6)	32.3 (0.2)	36.8 (2.7)	41.5 (5.3)	50.0 (10.0)	57.6 (14.2)	67.6 (19.8)	66.2 (19.0)	59.8 (15.4)	48.9 (9.4)	35.8 (2.1)	29.7 (−1.3)	46.3 (7.9)
Daily mean °F (°C)	24.7 (−4.1)	27.0 (−2.8)	30.7 (−0.7)	35.2 (1.8)	41.9 (5.5)	48.0 (8.9)	56.7 (13.7)	56.7 (13.7)	50.5 (10.3)	41.5 (5.3)	31.2 (−0.4)	24.8 (−4.0)	39.1 (3.9)
Mean daily minimum °F (°C)	19.9 (−6.7)	22.0 (−5.6)	24.5 (−4.2)	28.9 (−1.7)	33.9 (1.1)	40.0 (4.4)	46.0 (7.8)	47.2 (8.4)	41.3 (5.2)	34.1 (1.2)	26.6 (−3.0)	20.0 (−6.7)	32.0 (0.0)
Record low °F (°C)	−22 (−30)	−12 (−24)	−3 (−19)	11 (−12)	17 (−8)	25 (−4)	32 (0)	30 (−1)	28 (−2)	10 (−12)	−2 (−19)	−25 (−32)	−25 (−32)
Average precipitation inches (mm)	14.14 (359)	9.33 (237)	10.04 (255)	5.76 (146)	3.66 (93)	2.84 (72)	1.12 (28)	1.43 (36)	3.90 (99)	10.25 (260)	14.89 (378)	13.22 (336)	90.58 (2,299)
Average snowfall inches (cm)	104.7 (266)	77.6 (197)	70.6 (179)	32.6 (83)	9.2 (23)	0.7 (1.8)	0.1 (0.25)	0.0 (0.0)	0.5 (1.3)	16.1 (41)	66.4 (169)	93.3 (237)	471.8 (1,198)
Average precipitation days (≥ 0.01 in)	20.3	17.1	19.9	16.5	12.7	10.4	4.5	4.8	8.4	16.3	20.9	20.7	172.5
Source 1: XMACIS2 (temp normals) NOAA (precipitation)
Source 2: WRCC (records & snowfall)
