= Index, Washington =

Index x̌əx̌aʔusalʔtxʷ
- Town
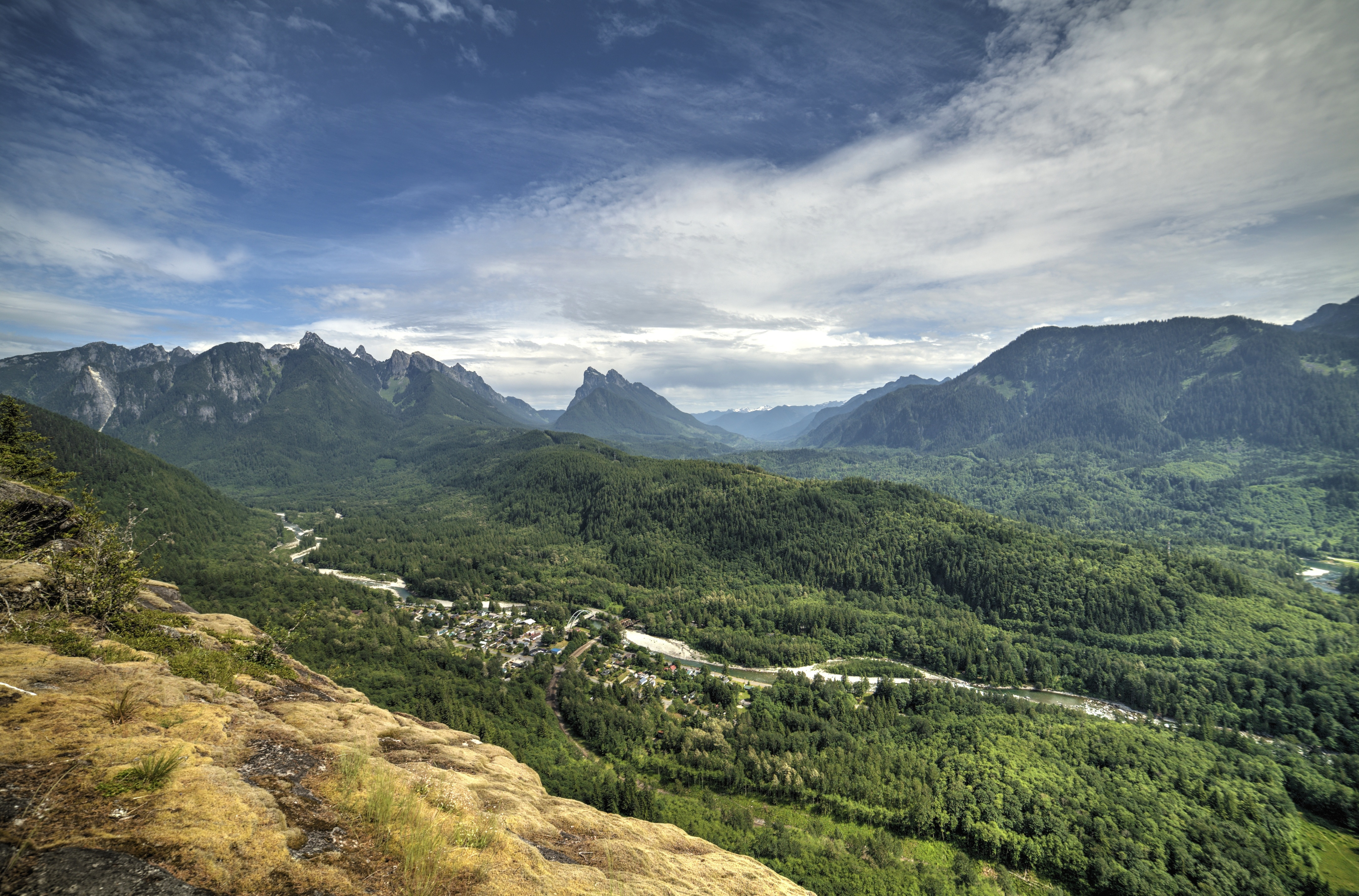
- Index and surrounding mountains viewed from the Index Town Wall Trailhead
- Interactive map of Index
- Coordinates: 47°49′15″N 121°33′14″W
- Country: United States
- State: Washington
- County: Snohomish
- Founded: 1889
- Incorporated: October 11, 1907

Government
  - Type: Mayor–council
  - Mayor: Norm Johnson

Area
  - Total: 0.23 sq mi (0.59 km^{2})
  - Land: 0.23 sq mi (0.59 km^{2})
  - Water: 0 sq mi (0.00 km^{2})
- Elevation: 541 ft (165 m)

Population (2020)
  - Total: 155
  - Estimate (2024): 160
  - Density: 680.4/sq mi (262.71/km^{2})
- Time zone: UTC-8 (Pacific (PST))
  - Summer (DST): UTC-7 (PDT)
- ZIP Code: 98256
- Area code: 360, 564
- FIPS code: 53-33175
- GNIS feature ID: 1521157

Index (Lushootseed: x̌əx̌aʔusalʔtxʷ) is a town in Snohomish County, Washington, United States. The population was 155 at the 2020 census, making it the smallest municipality in the county. Index lies at an elevation of 541 feet (165 m) along the North Fork Skykomish River in the Cascade Mountains. It is connected to surrounding communities by U.S. Route 2.

The town was established in 1889 by Amos Gunn and his family after they purchased an existing claim to build a home and hotel. It was named for Mount Index (now Baring Mountain), which resembled an index finger. Index became a stop on the Great Northern Railway in 1893 and was platted the same year amid a boom in mineral exploration in the area. The town reached its peak population of 1,000 residents by 1900 and was incorporated as a municipality on October 11, 1907.

Index's economy originally relied on mining, lumber, and a granite quarry, but these industries declined by the middle of the 20th century. The town lost many of its businesses and the permanent population shrank for decades before stabilizing between 150 and 200 residents; vacation homes and seasonal residents became more prevalent as the area continued to be a hub for outdoor recreation. Rock climbing on the cliffs of the Index Town Wall and rafting on the Skykomish River brought new tourism to the Index area and forms part of the modern economy.

== History ==
=== Pre-incorporation ===
Prior to settlement by European Americans, the Skykomish people had many villages along the Skykomish River between Sultan and Index. One large and important village of the bəsx̌əx̌əx̌alč band was at x̌əx̌aʔusalʔtxʷ (derived from sx̌aʔus, meaning "sawbill duck") in modern-day Index. At the village were several longhouses, including a large potlatch house. x̌əx̌aʔusalʔtxʷ was the base camp for people traveling into the Cascades for hunting and gathering. The Skykomish people were signatories of the 1855 Treaty of Point Elliott and many were moved to the Tulalip Indian Reservation, where they later amalgamated with the Snohomish and Snoqualmie tribes. Some members of the tribe elected to stay in the Skykomish Valley, primarily near Gold Bar and Sultan.

The first non-native settlers in the area were prospectors who placed individual mineral rights for claims in the Cascades, beginning with a gold rush in 1874 along Silver Creek near what later became the community of Galena. Amos Gunn, a Civil War veteran from Illinois, arrived at the fork of the Skykomish River with his wife and six children in 1889 and bought a squatter's claim to establish a homestead. He constructed a home that also served as a hotel for prospectors and railroad workers on the Great Northern Railway. His wife Persis named their site "Index" for nearby Mount Index (later renamed Baring Mountain), itself named for its resemblance to an index finger. Mount Persis and Gunn's Peaks were also named for the family. Mines in the area yielded gold, silver, copper, and galena among other minerals, which spurred further settlement around the North Fork Skykomish River.

Index was assigned a post office in November 1891 and Amos Gunn was appointed its first postmaster. He initially delivered mail and parcels by horseback from Wallace (now Startup) on a 12-mile (19 km) overland trail. The Gunns' hotel was expanded two years later to accommodate an increasing number of prospectors who arrived on the Great Northern and traveled onward towards Galena and Mineral City. The railroad across Stevens Pass had been completed in January 1893, and was followed within a few years by a stagecoach road from Index to Galena. The town plat for Index was filed by Amos Gunn on April 25, 1893, shortly after a controlling interest in the settlement was acquired by the Everett Terminal Land and Milling Company. The plat reserved 100 feet (30 m) for the main street, which had been surfaced with gravel due to frequent flooding from the Skykomish River and was sought for use for a branch railroad to Galena. A fire destroyed the Gunns' hotel, general store, and several residences in the town on July 22 of that year, but had not damaged the Great Northern depot. The town's buildings were rebuilt as mining activity had temporarily subsided due to the Panic of 1893 and was eclipsed by logging and farming as the main local industry. The Copper Bell and Sunset mines were opened in 1898 and brought the town to its peak population of 1,000 in 1900. The Sunset Mine was the largest in the area and produced 1,500 ounces (43 kg) of gold, 156,000 ounces (4,400 kg) of silver, and 12.9 million pounds (5.9 million kg) of copper during its lifetime.

=== Early 20th century ===
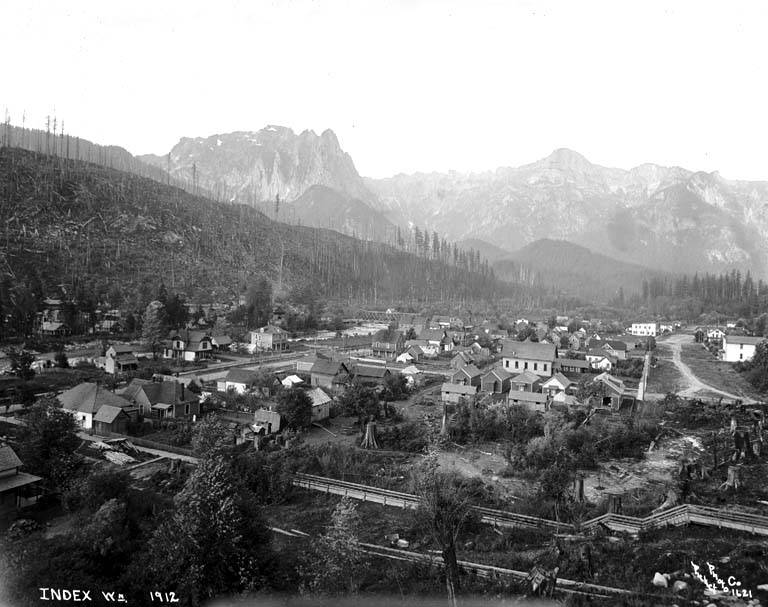
Panoramic view of Index, photographed in 1912 by Lee Pickett

Amos Gunn sold his properties in Index in 1899 shortly after the death of his wife Persis. The town continued to grow with the arrival of social clubs, a schoolhouse, and its first newspaper, the Index Miner (later the Index News), in 1899. In November 1902, a second major fire destroyed several buildings in the town, including the assay office, and killed one person. A granite quarry also opened east of Index in 1904 and later provided materials for the Washington State Capitol building in Olympia. It became one of the main employers in the area, along with logging to supply a new sawmill that was later acquired by the Index-Galena Lumber Company. Plans to build a hydroelectric dam and a pulp mill at sites along both forks of the Skykomish River were proposed but never began construction. Index was also promoted as a tourist destination for sport fishing and mountaineering; by 1905, it had five hotels and drew hundreds of visitors by train during the summer season.

Index was incorporated as a fourth-class city on October 11, 1907, with several hundred residents. A volunteer fire department was established and moved into a permanent fire station in 1913; its old facility was converted into a town hall with a jail. An unpaved county road was completed from Gold Bar to Index in 1911, which brought regular automobiles to the area and scheduled bus service. The road included a bridge over the Skykomish River that was destroyed by one of two major floods in 1917 and later rebuilt. The Stevens Pass Highway (now part of U.S. Route 2) opened on July 11, 1925, and opened the area to skiing with the development of a new ski area a few years later. The Great Northern's local trains, nicknamed the "Dinkies", made daily stops in every Skykomish Valley settlement and provided Index with passenger and postal service until they were discontinued in 1925 after the highway opened. The Stevens Pass Highway was rebuilt by the state government in 1933 and bypassed Index, which reduced tourist traffic to the town and caused several businesses to close.

The town's major industries saw reduced business during the early years of the Great Depression, which resulted in the shutdown of lumber mills and mines in the area. The granite quarry closed permanently after a fire destroyed its warehouse in May 1932; it was not rebuilt due to the decreased demand for granite. A Civilian Conservation Corps camp was established east of Index in 1934 to provide jobs for unemployed men and improve lands owned by the United States Forest Service in the Cascades. On August 16, 1939, a wildfire that formed west of Index swept into the town and destroyed the church and seven residences; hundreds of firefighters from the United States Forest Service and local fire departments in the region prevented the fire from causing further damage before it retreated into the forests. The Sunset Mine, the last remaining copper mine in the area, had financial issues and was taken over by its workers after a dispute over unpaid wages; it was shut down in 1942 by a federal order to halt mining of non-essential materials during World War II. A natural hot springs near the town continued to draw tourists and was developed into a major resort named the Garland Mineral Springs; during World War II, it was converted into a Coast Guard training camp.

=== Post-mining era ===
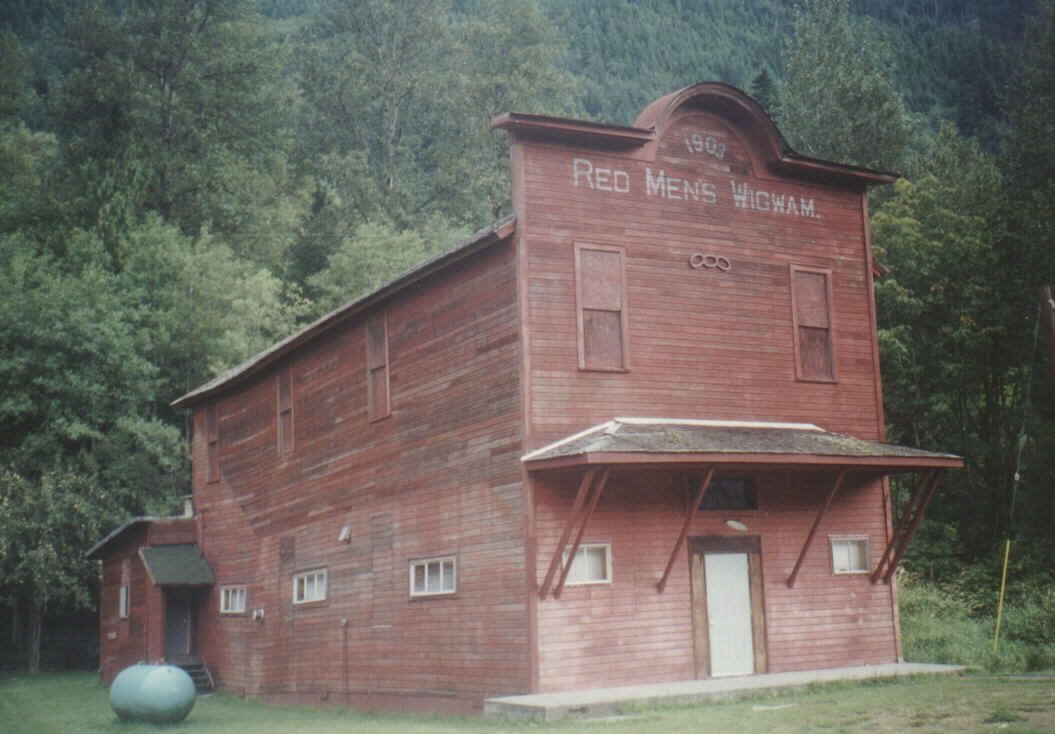
The Red Men Hall, listed on the National Register of Historic Places in 1973 and destroyed in 2009

Index entered a period of economic stagnation and reduced employment following the Great Depression and World War II, as most of its industries had closed and were not replaced. Local families left the town and were replaced by a population of retirees and urban residents who maintained vacation homes; by 1975, there was a permanent population of 171 residents in Index and the surrounding area. After Index's high school closed in 1942, students were moved to Sultan Senior High School. The other school buildings were condemned by the state fire marshal in 1952 and replaced three years later by a new consolidated school. From 1962 to 1964, Great Northern rebuilt its railroad through Index on an embankment with a wider curve that cut off several streets and split the town into two halves. The original railroad depot in the town was also demolished and the lone grade crossing was made steeper, creating a blind hill.

The town has been frequented by rock climbers since routes on the Index Town Wall, a set of granite cliffs that face the Skykomish River, were mapped in the 1950s and developed in the early 1970s by enthusiasts from Seattle. A replacement of Index's wooden water main and reservoir system, which are supplied by a mountain spring, began in 1967 and was completed a decade later by the town government using federal and state grants. The Bush House, a historic hotel that opened in 1898 and closed in the 1930s, was renovated and reopened as a restaurant in 1975 and for lodging two years later. It was among the few active businesses in Index along with a general store and tavern; the town had become a destination for retirees and vacationers by the 1970s and had few permanent residents. The Red Men Hall, traditionally a meeting place for the local chapter of the Independent Order of Red Men, was listed on the National Register of Historic Places in 1973.

On December 26, 1980, heavy rainfall caused the North Fork Skykomish River to flood Index and the surrounding area with up to 24 feet (7.3 m) of water. The flood washed away seven homes, a portion of Avenue A, and the town's water main, with damage estimated at $691,000 (equivalent to $2.2 million in 2024 dollars) by local officials. Buildings and roads were later rebuilt by residents, while a temporary riprap was installed by the U.S. Army Corps of Engineers. The town government had previously requested aid to repair an existing riprap along Avenue A that had been damaged in a 1975 flood as well as remove a 100-foot (30 m) log jam that had formed in the river upstream from Index. The Army Corps of Engineers constructed a new, 500-foot (150 m) riprap along Avenue A in April 1981 but denied responsibility for the flood damage, which it described as a "natural occurrence".

=== Transition to recreation economy ===
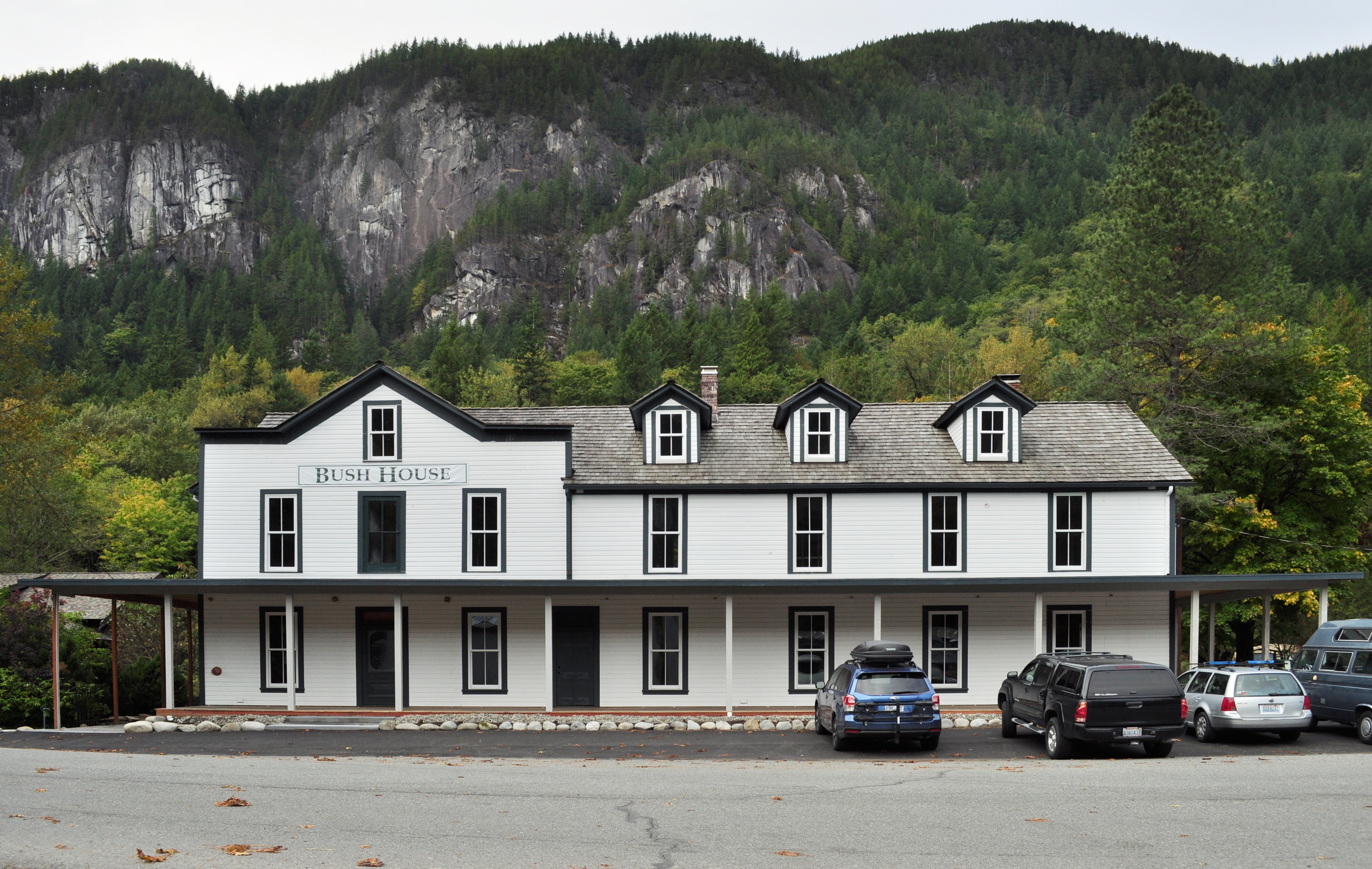
The Bush House, which reopened in 1975, with the Town Wall in the background

The town recovered from the 1980 flood and had organized emergency medical services and a new historical society within a few years. A total of 19 business licenses were issued by the town government, mostly to cottage industries and home businesses, in 1984. The reopening of the Bush Hotel was credited with the increase in local businesses, but the nearest gas station and medical clinics remained further west on U.S. Route 2. After Burlington Northern Railroad proposed the use of herbicide 2,4-D along their tracks through the town, local residents protested by blocking access until the railroad agreed to not spray near Index. A total of 11 residents were randomly selected by the Washington State Department of Social and Health Services for urine testing, which found the herbicide was not present in their bodies. The town council adopted a resolution to support the Nuclear Freeze campaign, which proposed a halt to development of new nuclear weapons, in 1983 amid rumors that some nuclear warheads would be transported on the railroad through Index.

The Index Town Wall was the site of a drilling experiment in 1984 for a local company that planned to supply a new machine to an Australian diamond mine. The experiment created a 12-foot (3.7 m) tunnel that ran 200 feet (61 m) deep into the granite face of the Town Wall; the tunnel was later repurposed by the University of Washington for physics experiments. The use of the Town Wall for the experiment and the expedited environmental review process for the project was criticized by The Mountaineers and other outdoor recreation groups. The Skykomish River around Index began to attract rafting excursions and operators in the 1980s, which led to conflicts with local residents due to increased traffic and litter as well as the use of town facilities without payment. In 1986, the town government approved a plan to build a paid boat ramp and parking facilities for rafting companies as part of a compromise to address the traffic and litter issues.

From 1980 to 1990, the town's population declined by 5.4 percent despite a boom in the number of new vacation homes built in Index and the surrounding area. Most permanent residents continued to commute out of Index to job centers in western Snohomish and King counties. The town's lone road crossing over the Skykomish River, a one-lane timber bridge, was replaced in September 1999 by a modern concrete bridge. The $4 million project (equivalent to $7.06 million in 2024 dollars) was primarily funded by the county and federal governments and had been initially opposed by local residents. Index's population had declined to approximately 150 by 1997, but the town government began planning infrastructure projects that would accommodate future population growth, including the replacement of septic tanks with a modern sewage system and a wastewater treatment plant. A new hiking trail to Lake Serene was constructed by the United States Forest Service with a large parking lot and other amenities in anticipation of high demand.

The state government began purchasing land around the Index Town Wall in the early 1990s and formally proposed the creation of a new 1,300-acre (530 ha) state park. It was named Forks of the Sky State Park and the Town Wall was donated to expand the park in 2010. A nearby portion of the Mount Baker–Snoqualmie National Forest was designated as the Wild Sky Wilderness by the federal government in 2008 to protect over 106,000 acres (43,000 ha) of alpine habitat for wildlife. The Skykomish River flooded portions of Index on November 6, 2006, and caused $7 million in recorded damage locally, including washouts on portions of Index–Galena Road that were not fully repaired until 2023. Additional recreation areas around the town were developed in the 2000s through a nonprofit conservation group that was organized in response to a 2006 proposal to begin clearcutting for timber harvesting on Heybrook Ridge. The group raised $600,000 to acquire the land and partnered with the county government to develop Heybrook Ridge County Park, which opened in 2017.

The Washington Department of Fish and Wildlife, in a partnership with the Tulalip Tribes, published plans in 2021 to construct a fish hatchery near Sunset Falls. The hatchery aims to increase the population of native steelhead trout in the Skykomish River, which had been stocked with imported trout from the Columbia River basin.

== Geography ==
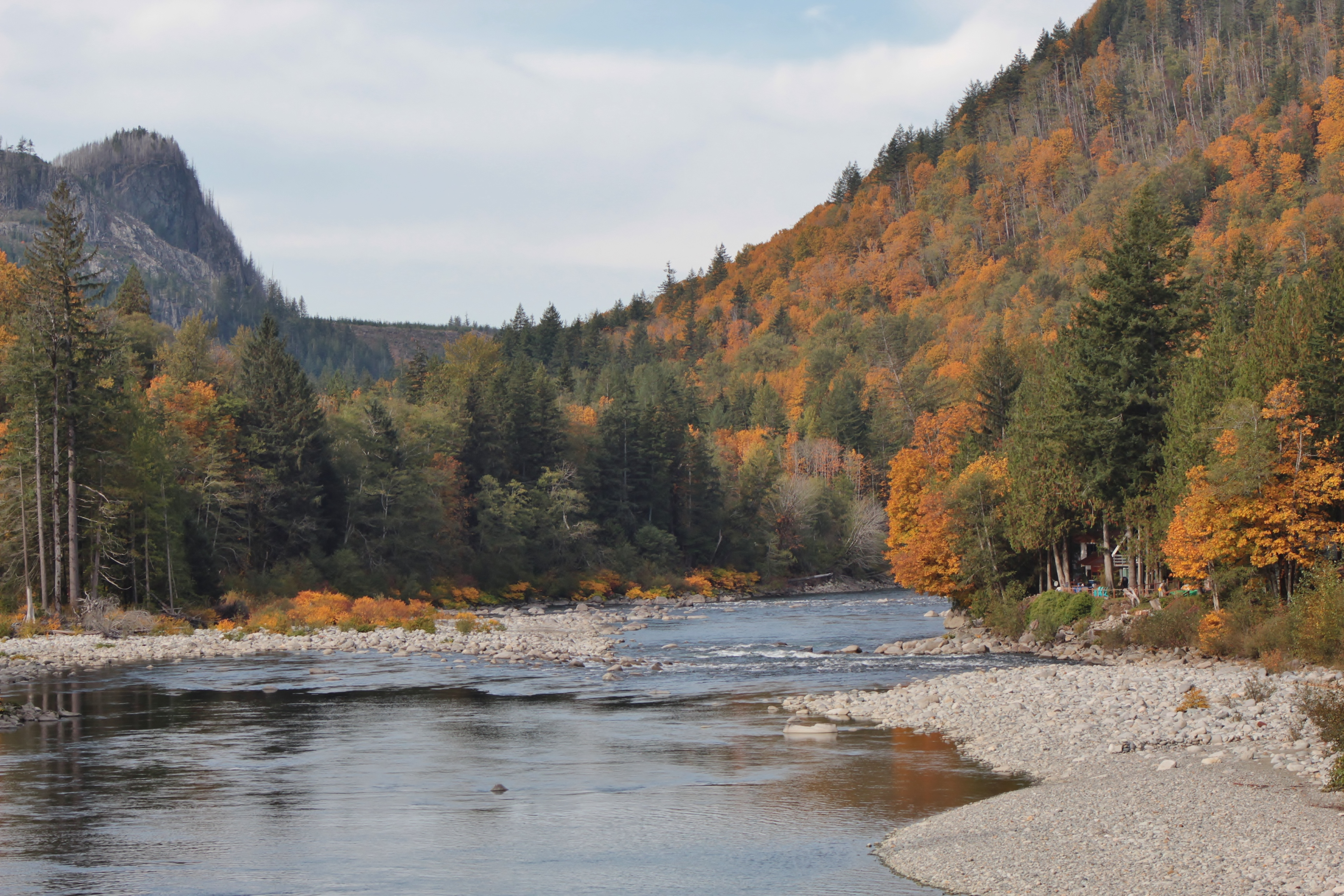
The North Fork Skykomish River in Index

Index lies in the western foothills of the Cascade Mountains on the north side of the North Fork Skykomish River, just above its confluence with the main channel of the Skykomish River. The town is in southeastern Snohomish County, approximately 7 miles (11 km) east of Gold Bar and 30 miles (48 km) west of Stevens Pass. It is connected to nearby areas by U.S. Route 2, a major highway that runs one mile (1.6 km) south of the town and travels 36 miles (58 km) west to Everett and east across the Cascades. Index is bisected by the Scenic Subdivision of the BNSF Railway, a railroad originally built by the Great Northern Railway that carries freight trains and Amtrak's Empire Builder passenger service.

The town has a total area of 0.23 square miles (0.60 km^{2}), all of it land, according to the United States Census Bureau. Index and its outlying unincorporated areas are surrounded by the Mount Baker–Snoqualmie National Forest and other protected lands; the Wild Sky Wilderness area is east of the town. The southern boundary is the North Fork Skykomish River, while the northern border is defined by the Index Town Walls and Forks of the Sky State Park. The Town Walls are a series of granite cliffs in Forks of the Sky State Park that rise 360 to 600 feet (110 to 180 m) above the valley and are popular with rock climbers. The cliffs are also home to nests for peregrine falcons, which necessitate occasional closures to climbing for protection.

Index sits at an elevation of 500 to 540 feet (150 to 160 m), while the surrounding mountains range from 5,464 to 6,244 feet (1,665 to 1,903 m) in height. These include Mount Index to the south at 5,991 feet (1,826 m) and Gunn Peak to the east at 6,240 feet (1,900 m). The mountains around Index are primarily batholiths that formed from cooled magma lifted to the surface approximately 34 million years before present. The town also lies near the Straight Creek Fault, a major strike-slip fault that generates seismic activity. The area southeast of Index includes several waterfalls on the South Fork Skykomish River. Sunset Falls is one mile (1.6 km) south of Index and comprises a 104-foot (32 m) drop in a 275-foot (84 m) granite chute. Eagle Falls is 4 miles (6.4 km) southeast of the town and is the site of frequent rescues due to its popularity and fast-moving rapids.

The Index area has a moderate summer climate with approximately 213 frost-free days and average annual precipitation of 180 inches (460 cm). It receives more snowfall than most populated areas of the county, with an annual average of 59.3 inches (151 cm) from 1948 to 1957. The area north of the town is designated a "high risk" area for wildfires, while other areas are within the 100-year flood zone for the Skykomish River. Index and neighboring areas were placed under mandatory evacuation orders on September 10, 2022, due to the nearby Bolt Creek Fire. The order was modified two days later to allow residents to return to their homes, but U.S. Route 2 remained closed to most travel for several days. The fire burned approximately 15,000 acres (6,100 ha) and was contained in late October.

== Economy ==
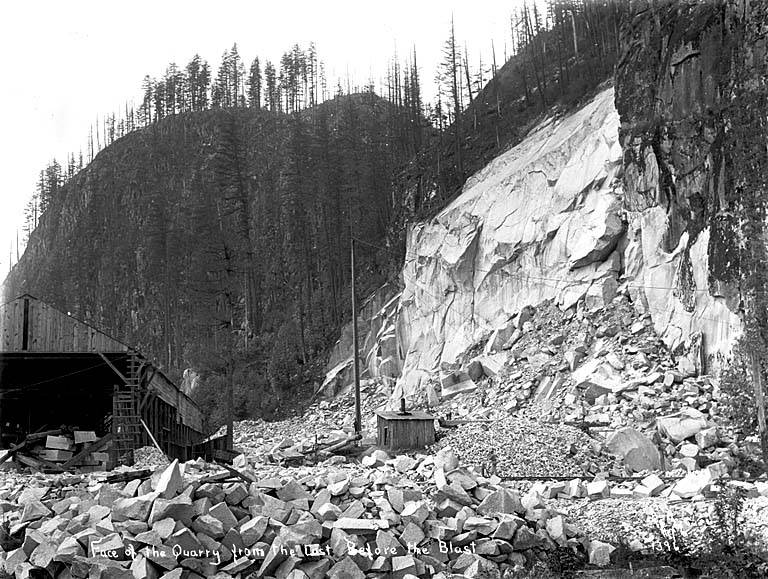
A granite quarry near Index, c. 1911

The area had several granite quarries that were used to supply building materials for the Washington State Capitol Building and the base of the Smith Tower in Seattle. Since the 20th century, the local economy has transitioned from resource extraction industries to tourism, particularly outdoor recreation in the summer months. Index's residents are a mix of retirees, commuters to other areas, and those who work in cottage industries and businesses that cater to tourists. Paradise Sound maintained a recording studio where albums were recorded by Alice in Chains and The Walkabouts.

As of the 2023 American Community Survey estimates, the most common employers for Index residents are in the retail sector, followed by construction and educational services. Approximately 62 residents are employed outside of the town; the most common commuting destinations are Seattle (17.7%), Monroe (14.5%), and Everett (11.3%). The mean one-way commute for the town's workers was 39.3 minutes; 81 percent of commuters drove alone to their place of employment.

== Demographics ==
Historical population
Census	Pop.	Note	%±
1910	417		—
1920	412		−1.2%
1930	381		−7.5%
1940	217		−43.0%
1950	211		−2.8%
1960	158		−25.1%
1970	169		7.0%
1980	147		−13.0%
1990	139		−5.4%
2000	157		12.9%
2010	178		13.4%
2020	155		−12.9%
2023 (est.)	160	▲	3.2%
U.S. Decennial Census

Index has a permanent population of 155 residents as of the 2020 census, many of whom are retirees or work locally. The town also has seasonal residents living in vacation homes or other accommodations, bringing the area's population to an estimated 500 people during the summer months. Index is the smallest municipality in Snohomish County and Western Washington. The town's population had peaked at 1,000 residents near 1900 and declined since, remaining relatively unchanged since 1960.

=== 2020 census ===
As of the 2020 U.S. census, there were 155 people and 72 households living in the town, which had a population density of 673.91 inhabitants per square mile (260.2/km^{2}). There were 100 total housing units, of which 72% were occupied and 28% were vacant or for occasional use. The racial makeup of Index was 85.2% White, 1.9% Native American and Alaskan Native, 0.6% Black or African American, 0.6% Asian, and 0.0% Native Hawaiian and Pacific Islander. Residents who listed another race were 0.0% of the population and those who identified as more than one race were 11.6% of the population. Hispanic or Latino residents of any race were 4.5% of the population.

Of the 72 households in Index, 41.7% were married couples living together and 9.7% were cohabitating but unmarried. Households with a male householder with no spouse or partner were 27.8% of the population, while households with a female householder with no spouse or partner were 20.8% of the population. Out of all households, 27.8% had children under the age of 18 living with them and 41.7% had residents who were 65 years of age or older. There were 72 occupied housing units in Index, of which 79.2% were owner-occupied and 20.8% were occupied by renters.

The median age in the town was 48.8 years old for all sexes, 47.5 years old for males, and 52.5 years old for females. Of the total population, 16.2% of residents were under the age of 19; 24.5% were between the ages of 20 and 39; 34.2% were between the ages of 40 and 64; and 25.2% were 65 years of age or older. The gender makeup of the town was 51.6% male and 48.4% female.

=== 2010 census ===
As of the 2010 U.S. census, there were 178 people, 80 households, and 44 families living in the town. The population density was 773.9 inhabitants per square mile (298.8/km^{2}). There were 116 housing units at an average density of 504.3 per square mile (194.7/km^{2}). The racial makeup of the town was 95.5% White, 1.7% Asian, 0.6% Pacific Islander, 0.6% from other races, and 1.7% from two or more races. Hispanic or Latino of any race were 4.5% of the population.

There were 80 households, of which 26.3% had children under the age of 18 living with them, 41.3% were married couples living together, 12.5% had a female householder with no husband present, 1.3% had a male householder with no wife present, and 45.0% were non-families. 41.3% of all households were made up of individuals, and 12.5% had someone living alone who was 65 years of age or older. The average household size was 2.23 and the average family size was 3.02.

The median age in the town was 42 years. 22.5% of residents were under the age of 18; 5.6% were between the ages of 18 and 24; 24.1% were from 25 to 44; 35.5% were from 45 to 64; and 12.4% were 65 years of age or older. The gender makeup of the town was 47.2% male and 52.8% female.

== Government and politics ==
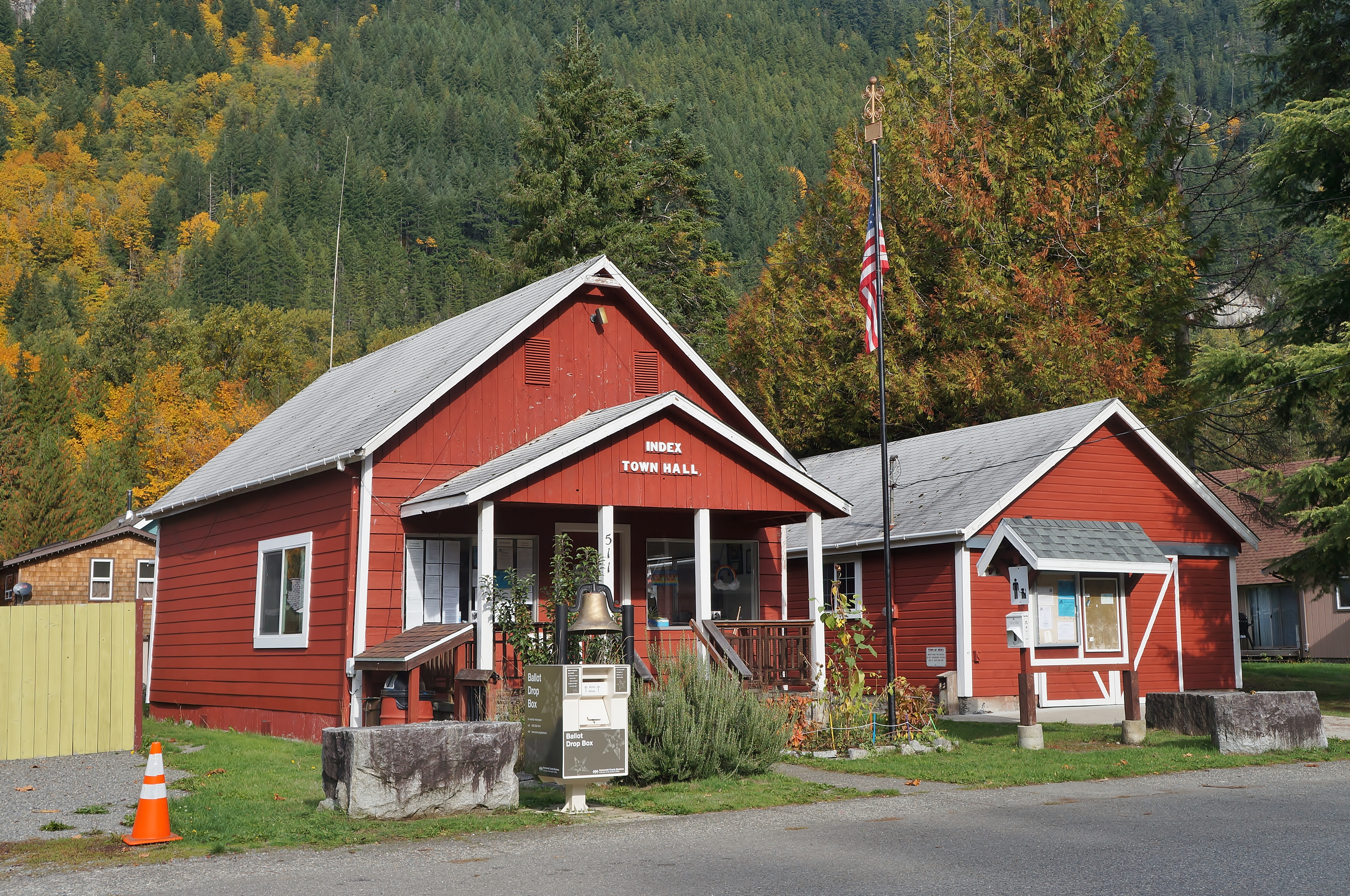
Index Town Hall

Index is an incorporated town with a mayor–council form of government. The mayor and five-member town council are elected to four-year terms by residents who are eligible to vote. As of 2025, Norm Johnson is the town's mayor. Index's government has three employed positions: a clerk for day-to-day management, a maintenance person, and a water distribution manager to oversee the water supply. The town contracts with the county government to provide additional services such as fire and building inspections and land use planning. The Snohomish County Sheriff's Office provides law enforcement and search-and-rescue services, while Sky Valley Fire is contracted for firefighting and protection in a partnership with the volunteer firefighter district.

The town had the highest voter turnout of any municipality in Snohomish County from 2013 to 2023, with 60 percent of residents returning a ballot in the 2023 general election. At the federal level, Index is part of the 8th congressional district, which encompasses the eastern portions of the Snohomish, King, and Pierce counties as well as the entirety of Chelan and Kittitas counties. It was part of the 1st congressional district until 2022, when the 8th district was extended into Snohomish County. At the state level, the town is part of the 12th legislative district, which also crosses the Cascade Mountains and includes Skykomish, part of Snoqualmie, and all of Chelan County except for Wenatchee. Index was previously part of the 39th legislative district until it was moved into the cross-mountain district as part of a redistricting compromise in 2022. The town also lies within the Snohomish County Council's 5th district, which includes the Skykomish Valley, Snohomish, and Lake Stevens.

== Culture ==
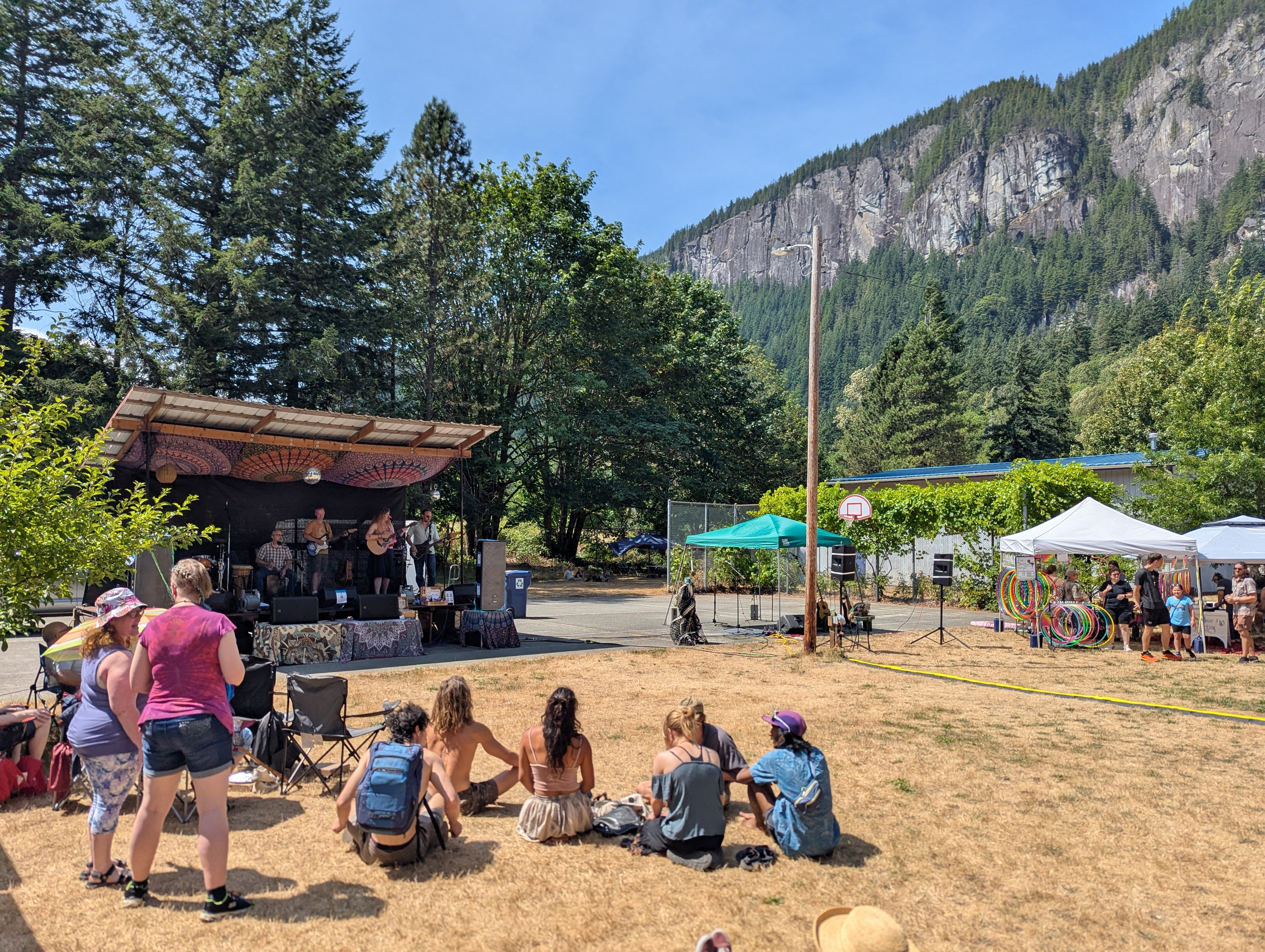
A performance during the Index Arts Festival in 2025

The town's museum, the Index-Pickett Historical Museum, opened in June 1986 and is maintained by the Index Historical Society. The museum is named for Dorothy Pickett, a local schoolteacher and wife of Great Northern Railway photographer Lee Pickett. It was originally located in a toolshed the Picketts used until the museum was moved to their former home. The Red Men Hall, a fraternal lodge and the largest building in Index, was constructed in 1903 and served as the center for social life in the town. It was listed on the National Register of Historic Places in 1973 but collapsed in 2009 after a severe snowstorm and was subsequently demolished. Another historic building in Index, the Bush House, was opened as a hotel in 1898 and closed multiple times throughout its history, leading to its listing as an endangered landmark by the Washington Trust for Historic Preservation in 2009. A major renovation began in 2012 and the Bush House reopened for use as a hotel and event venue in 2017; a new restaurant at the hotel was opened in June 2023.

The Index Arts Festival was founded in 2004 and is held annually at Doolittle Pioneer Park during the first weekend in August. It includes exhibitions, outdoor musical performances, poetry, and live demonstrations of specialty arts. The Index area has been used for several film and television productions, including the 1987 film Harry and the Hendersons and 2016 film Captain Fantastic.

=== Religion ===
The town is home to the Aquarian Tabernacle Church, a Wicca church that was established in Seattle and moved to Index in 1979. The church was among the first modern Pagan institutions to be recognized by the state government; it also operates an online seminary based in Index. The Aquarian Tabernacle also organizes Wiccan holiday events at nearby state parks that draw more than 200 worshippers. The town is also home to a Protestant Christian church. The Snow Mountain Monastery, a Buddhist monastery and retreat, moved from Skykomish to Index in 2013.

== Parks and recreation ==
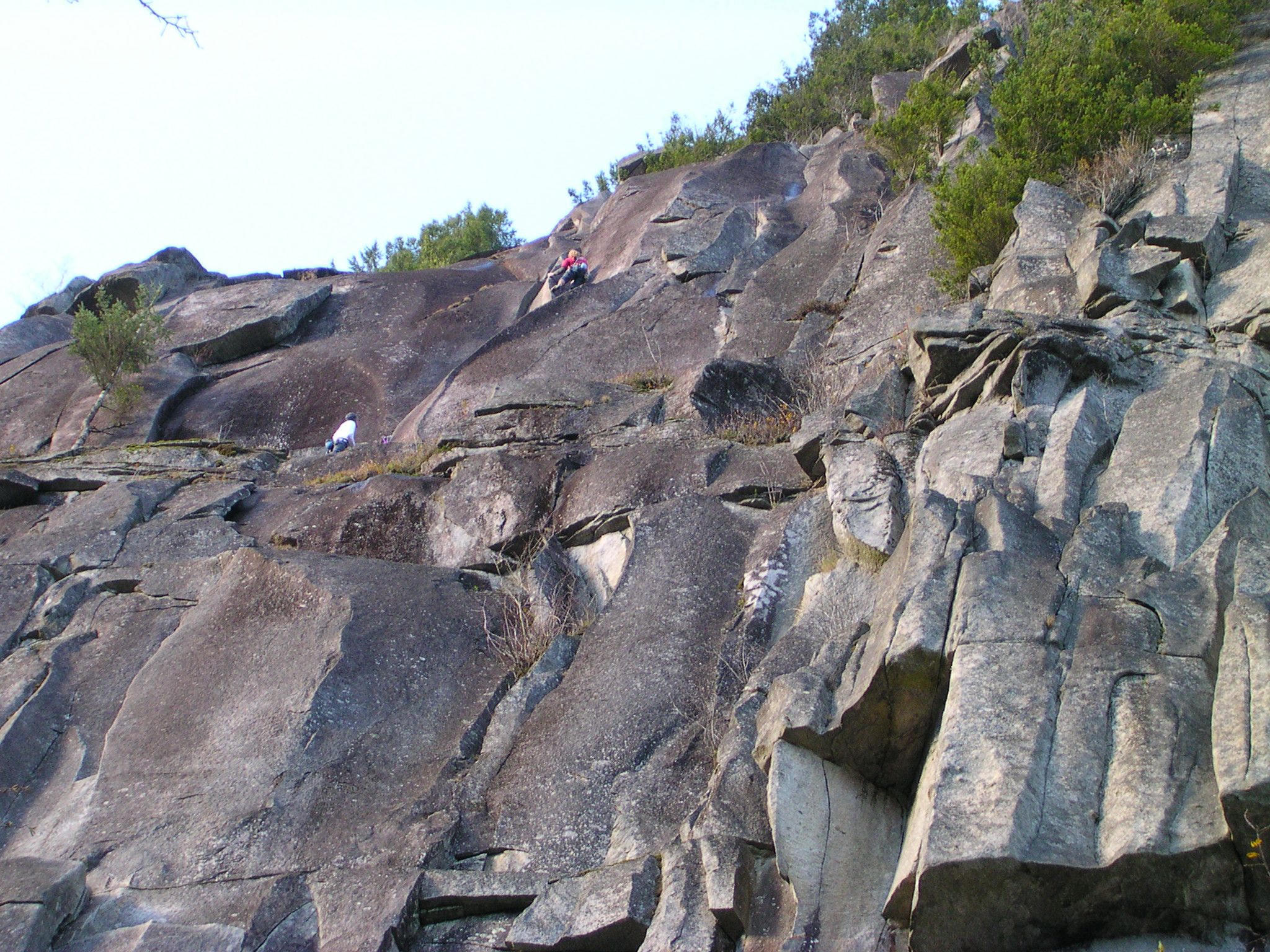
Rock climbers on the Index Town Wall

Index lies along the Cascade Loop Scenic Byway and is 30 miles (48 km) west of Stevens Pass, which has a ski area and other winter activities. The Index Town Wall, a set of granite cliffs that face the town, is among the most popular crags in Washington and draws climbers from the Puget Sound region. It includes 402 routes for climbing and bouldering that range in difficulty, including beginner's courses that are nicknamed the "classroom". Most of the area was acquired by private climbing organizations, who collected $250,000 in pledges, and donated in 2010 to the state government for inclusion in Forks of the Sky State Park. The 20-acre (8.1 ha) Lower Town Wall was acquired by the Washington Climbers Coalition in 2010 to prevent it from being sold to a quarry operator; it was added to the state park later that year. Non-profit climbing groups have purchased parcels near the Town Wall for recreation and conservation, including donations to expand the state park.

The Skykomish River is a popular whitewater rafting corridor with several companies based out of Index that operate along the river and within the Wild Sky Wilderness area. The river includes sections that are rated from Class III to V on the international scale. The river is also used for fishing, particularly for steelhead trout, and has swimming areas around waterfalls east of the town. The sole urban park in Index is Doolittle Pioneer Park, which includes a picnic shelter and public barbeque. Doolittle Pioneer Park was opened in 1976 for the national bicentennial and displays a rock-cutting saw from the former granite quarry near Index. A rail trail, named Crescent Trail, follows the former trackbed of the Great Northern Railway west of the town.

The surrounding area also includes several hiking trails maintained by the United States Forest Service and the Snohomish County Parks & Recreation Department. The Mount Baker–Snoqualmie National Forest includes the Lake Serene Trail, which records 45,000 visitors annually and leads to the base of Mount Index. An outdoor shooting range on national forest property near Index was opened in 1947 and operated until 2004, including for several decades without a valid special use permit from the Forest Service. The range was permanently closed due to lead contamination. Heybrook Ridge County Park, which has several trails and a historic fire lookout, opened in 2017 after nine years of development by the county government. The land was acquired in a public–private partnership with a volunteer conservation group in 2008 to prevent the area from being clearcut. Another trail in the county park, Erinswood Trail, opened at the bottom of the ridge in 2021 with full accessibility for wheelchairs.

== Education ==
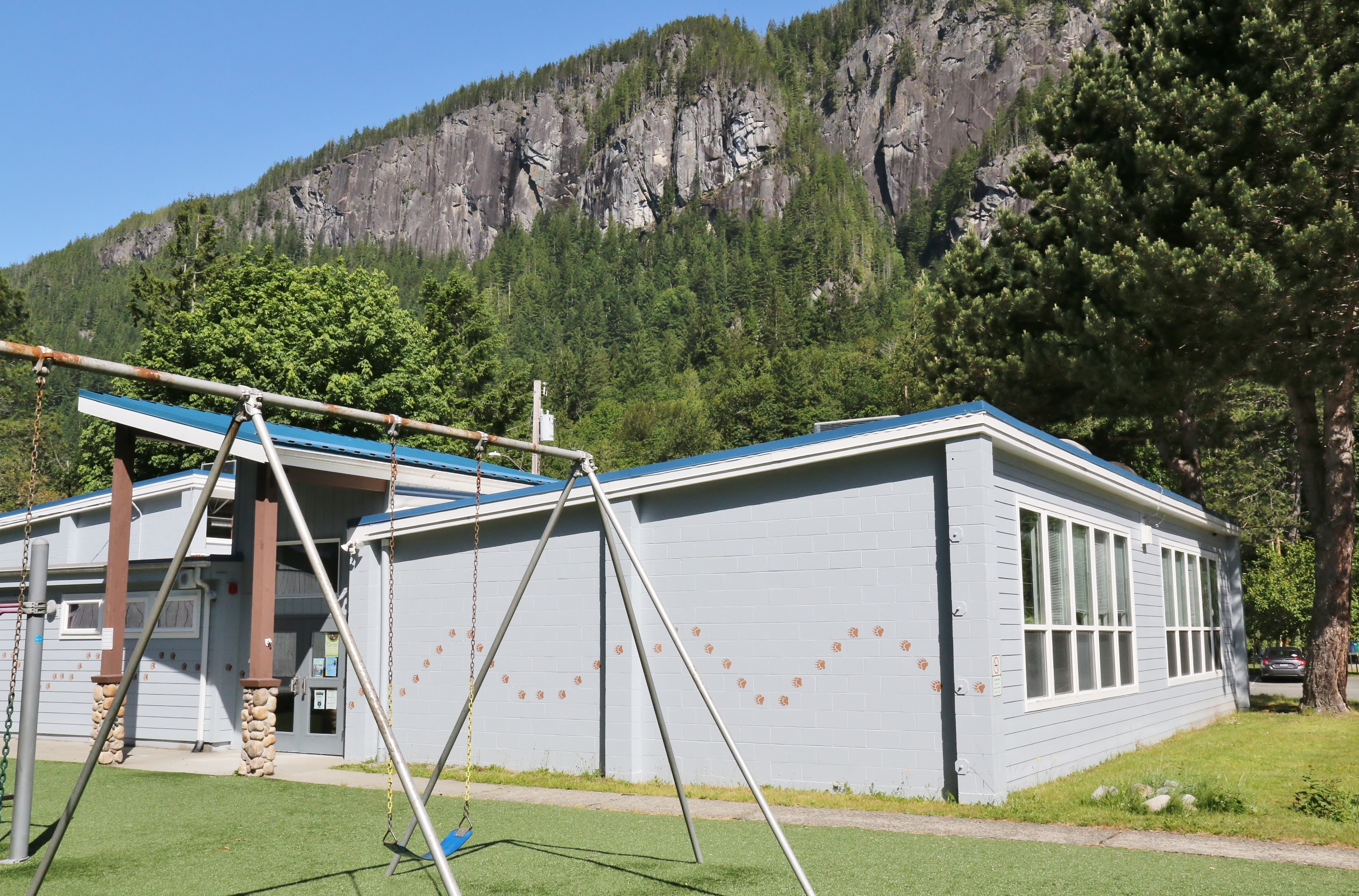
Index's elementary school with the Town Walls in the background

The Index School District serves the town and surrounding areas in the southeast corner of Snohomish County. It has a single combined elementary–middle school with an enrollment of 23 students and three full-time teachers as of 2023. The school district was established in 1892 and built its first schoolhouse in 1899 for a class of 40 students; the schoolhouse was replaced in 1908 by the Index School, a larger building with four classrooms. A high school was opened in 1918, but was only used until 1942 as enrollment declined; high school students have been bused to Sultan Senior High School since Index High School was closed. A new school building was constructed in 1955 to replace the condemned Index School and remains in use; its original courtyard was later replaced with an indoor computer lab. Most of the building was renovated in 2019 using a grant from the state government.

The town is part of the Sno-Isle Libraries system, which operates a twice-monthly bookmobile service to Index. Index's original public library was established in 1913 and was one of several small-town libraries to receive a donation of used books from the Seattle Public Library system. It was later dissolved due to low patronage and the collection was donated to a nearby resort.

== Infrastructure ==
=== Transportation ===
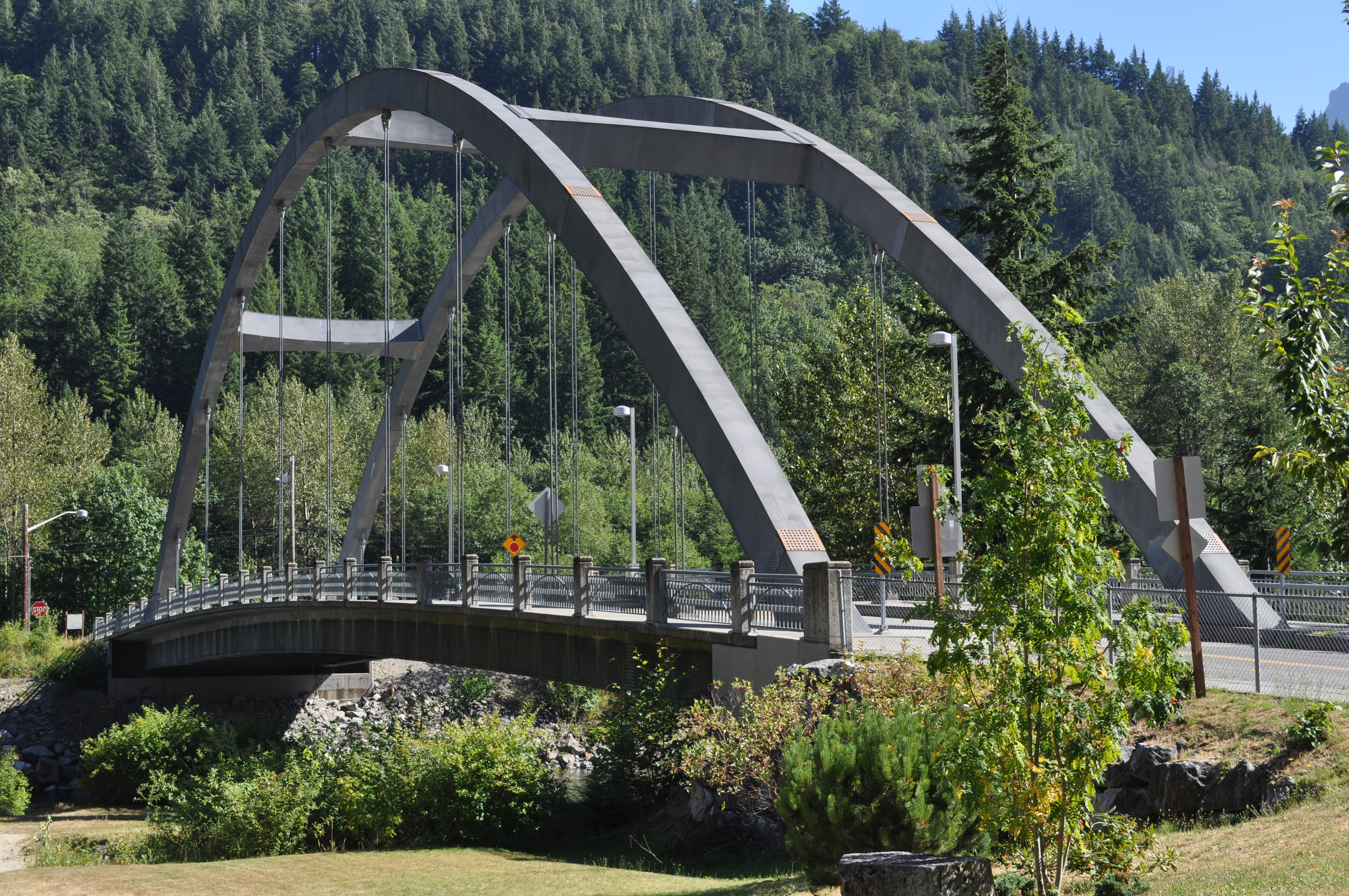
The Wes Smith Bridge, opened in 1999, connects Index to U.S. Route 2

Index is located one mile (1.6 km) northeast of U.S. Route 2 (US 2), which connects Everett to the Skykomish Valley and Stevens Pass. The town is connected to US 2 by Index–Galena Road, which continues northeast into the Wild Sky Wilderness. A flood in November 2006 washed out a section of the road beyond Index at milepost 6.4. The road was reopened in November 2023 after a three-year repair project that relocated sections to higher ground and added new culverts and bridges. The project cost $29 million to complete and was mostly funded by the federal government.

The town's bridge over the North Fork Skykomish River is the Smith Bridge, a 265-foot (81 m) tied-arch bridge that carries two lanes of 5th Street to Index–Galena Road. It opened in September 1999 and was the first tied-arch bridge in Snohomish County, with a height of 65 feet (20 m). The Smith Bridge replaced the earlier Index Bridge No. 122, a timber bridge that was constructed in 1918 and only carried one lane of traffic. The old bridge had been moved 30 feet (9.1 m) from its original site in April 1998 to be used during construction of the new bridge; the relocated bridge was also closed entirely for several days in October 1998 to prepare for flood control measures, leaving Index with only a winding gravel road to connect to the rest of the world.

Index is part of the public transportation benefit area for Community Transit, the countywide bus and paratransit system. The agency introduced bus service to the town from Sultan in October 1981 with onward connections to Skykomish. The bus route was later removed, leaving Index with no regular service. The Town of Skykomish runs a regional vanpool once per week in lieu of normal buses.

=== Utilities ===
Electric power for Index is provided by the Snohomish County Public Utility District (PUD), a consumer-owned public utility that serves all of Snohomish County. The utility derives most of its electricity from hydroelectricity that it purchases from the federal Bonneville Power Administration or generates on its own. The PUD's plan to build an inflatable dam near Sunset Falls east of Index was abandoned in 2018 due to opposition from environmentalists and local residents, who sought a wild and scenic designation for the river. Another plan by the PUD to harness geothermal energy northeast of Index at Garland Mineral Springs was shelved in 2012 after test drills found bedrock instead of more favorable underground conditions. Natural gas for the town's residents and businesses is provided by Puget Sound Energy, a private company that serves most of the Seattle metropolitan area.

The town's main water source is a spring that draws from groundwater and is collected by wells and stored in an underground vault. The drinking water is not treated or filtered due to its minimal contact with human contamination and is regularly monitored for safety. In the 1980s, the town government considered a proposal to collect and sell bottled water from its municipal source. The water supply has 129 connections, including 119 residential customers. Index lacks a sewage treatment plant and instead relies on individual septic tanks. The town's curbside solid waste and recycling pickup is contracted out to Waste Management.

Index has limited telecommunications service that is primarily provided by satellite and mobile broadband companies. Ziply Fiber provides landline telephone and internet service to customers in the town. In 2024, the county government approved a contract with Ziply Fiber to provide broadband internet service to Index using an existing fiber line. The $4.3 million program, which also includes Verlot, is funded by the American Rescue Plan Act of 2021 and is expected to be completed in 2025.
