= 2022 Washington wildfires =

Wildfire season

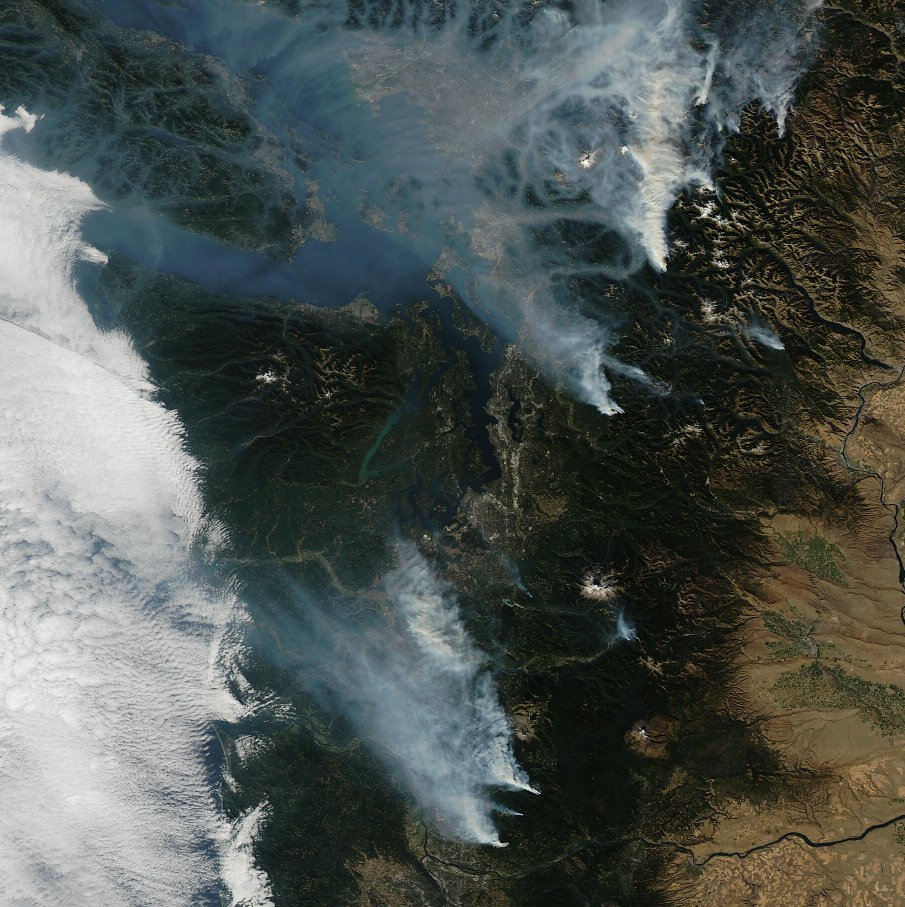
- High-Resolution satellite imagery across Western Washington in mid-October.
- Date: March 2022–December 2022

Impacts
- Deaths: 0

The 2022 Washington wildfire season officially began in March 2022. There were four large wildfires that burnt 30,800 acres (12,500 ha) across the US state of Washington. The season started quieter than normal due to unusually colder weather that kept Eastern and Southeastern Washington burning index's largely below normal into July. As of June 2026, a total of 140,000 acres (57,000 ha) of land in the state was burned – the fewest number of acres burned since 2012.

== Background ==
While the typical "fire season" in Washington varies every year based on weather conditions, most wildfires occur in between July and October. However, hotter, drier conditions can allow wildfires to start outside of these boundaries. Wildfires tend to start at these times of the year after moisture from winter and spring precipitation dries up. Vegetation and overall conditions are the hottest and driest in these periods. The increase of vegetation can make the fires spread easier.

== Season narrative ==
Monsoon-driven thunderstorm activity started several wildfires in August. One of these located south of Lind in Adams County was ignited on the morning of August 4 and grew to more than 2,000 acres (810 ha). It resulted in 10 homes burned and the evacuation of the town.

Smoke from the Cedar Creek Fire in central Oregon moved into Southwest Washington then the Puget Sound region on September 10; on that day Seattle recorded the worst air quality of any major city in the world.

The Bolt Creek Fire, a human-caused wildfire on the western slopes of the Cascades September 10–11, caused the closure of U.S. Highway 2 for over a week in September, and the evacuation of Skykomish, Washington. By early October the fire was 36 percent contained and continuing to spread northwards into the Wild Sky Wilderness, causing poor air quality in western Washington. Highway 2 was closed again on October 5 and 9–10 to remove burned trees threatening road safety, and intermittent closures were expected to continue later in October.

On the weekend of October 15–16, easterly winds over the Cascades brought dry, subsiding air and record temperatures to the Puget Sound area. The weather conditions contributed to the initiation and expansion of fires on the west slopes of the Cascades, and the worst air quality of the season so far occurred in Seattle that weekend. Fires included the Nakia Creek Fire in Southwest Washington and one on private timberland near Loch Katrine in the Alpine Lakes Wilderness 30 miles east of Seattle. Flames from the Loch Katrine fire could be seen from Seattle.

On October 18 and 19, due to wildfire smoke, Seattle had the worst air quality of any major city in the world.

== List of wildfires ==
The following is a list of fires that burned more than 1,000 acres (400 hectares), produced significant structural damage or casualties, or were otherwise notable. Costs are in 2022 USD.

Name	County	Acres	Start date	Containment date (Note: Containment means that fire crews have established and secured control lines around the fire's perimeter. These lines are artificial barriers, like trenches or cleared vegetation, designed to stop the fire's spread, or natural barriers like rivers. Containment reflects progress in managing the fire but does not necessarily mean the fire is starved of fuel, under control, or put out.)	Notes	Ref
Goat Rocks	Lewis	6,196	August 8, 2022		Caused by lightning; $19.4 million to suppress. Fire was 10% contained into late October 2022.	
White River		14,442	August 11, 2022		Caused by lightning; $19.3 million to suppress	
Bolt Creek	King, Snohomish	14,820	September 10, 2022		Human-caused; $15 million to suppress	
Minnow Ridge	Chelan	5,350	September 10, 2022		Unknown cause; The National Centers for Environmental Information reported it caused $115 million (2023 USD) in property damage.	
Nakia Creek	Clark	1,918	October 9, 2022		Human-caused; $6.8 million to suppress	

== See also ==
- 2020–2023 North American drought
- List of Washington wildfires
- Southwestern North American megadrought
