= Red Men Hall (Index, Washington) =

- U.S. National Register of Historic Places
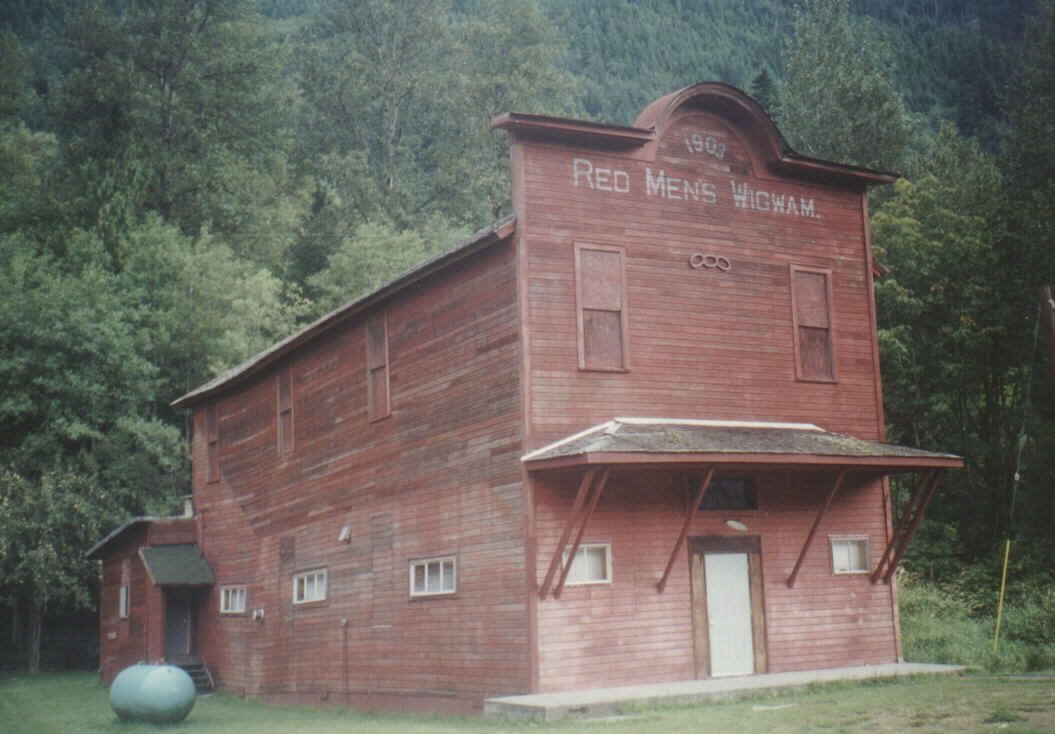
- The former building in 2007

- Location within Washington (state) Location within the United States
- Location: 530 Index Avenue, Index, Washington, 98256 U.S.
- Coordinates: 47°49′18″N 121°33′14″W
- Built: 1903
- Architectural style: Western false front
- Demolished: 2009
- NRHP reference No.: 73001889
- Added to NRHP: April 13, 1973

The Red Men Hall, also known as the Redmen Wigwam, was a meeting hall in Index, Washington originally for the Improved Order of Red Men. The building, which was listed on the National Register of Historic Places in 1973, collapsed on New Year's Day 2009.

== Organization ==
The Red Men are a fraternal lodge which imitate perceived Native American traditions and call their local lodges "wigwams". The Index Tribe #68 of the Great Council of Washington constructed the building in 1903 which included a stage and kitchen. The building was the largest structure in the small logging and mining town and served as a center of social activities including vaudeville shows, weddings, and political gatherings.

== Building ==
The building was a two-story wood-frame structure built with local lumber a narrow, country-store style with an arched roof and a false front. A bracket-supported slope-roofed porch spanned the entire front of the building. Despite several efforts at restoration, the building was long since abandoned by January 1, 2009 when it collapsed from the weight of the snow from a major storm in the high elevation. No trace remains of the building today.

== Gallery ==
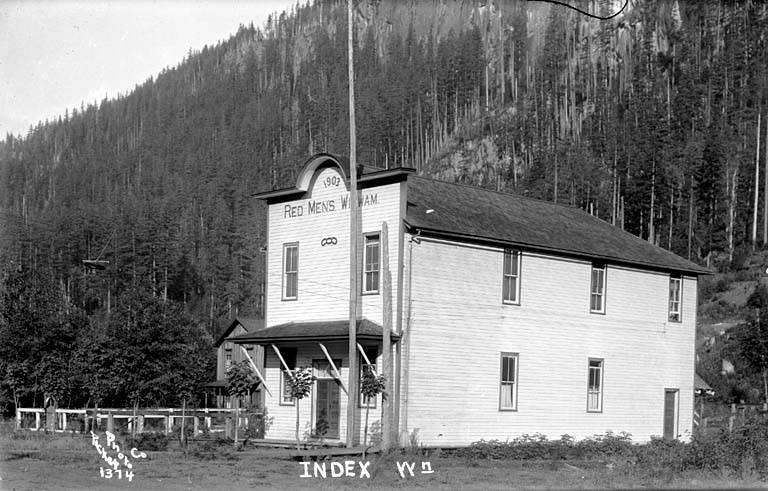
The new building, c. 1910

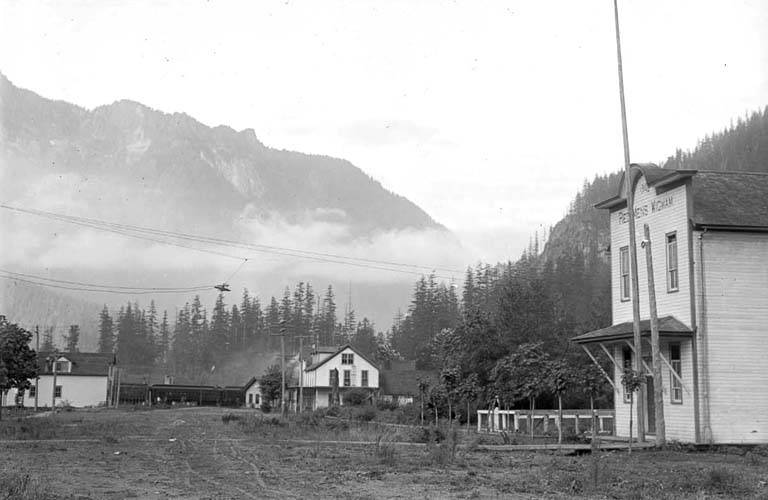
Location within town, 1912

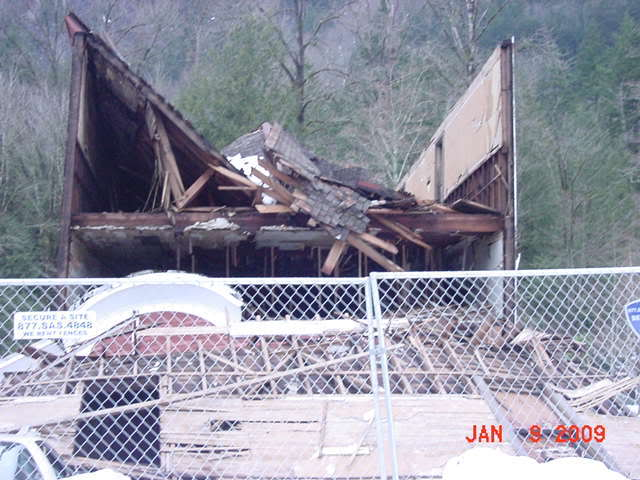
Building after its collapse, 2009

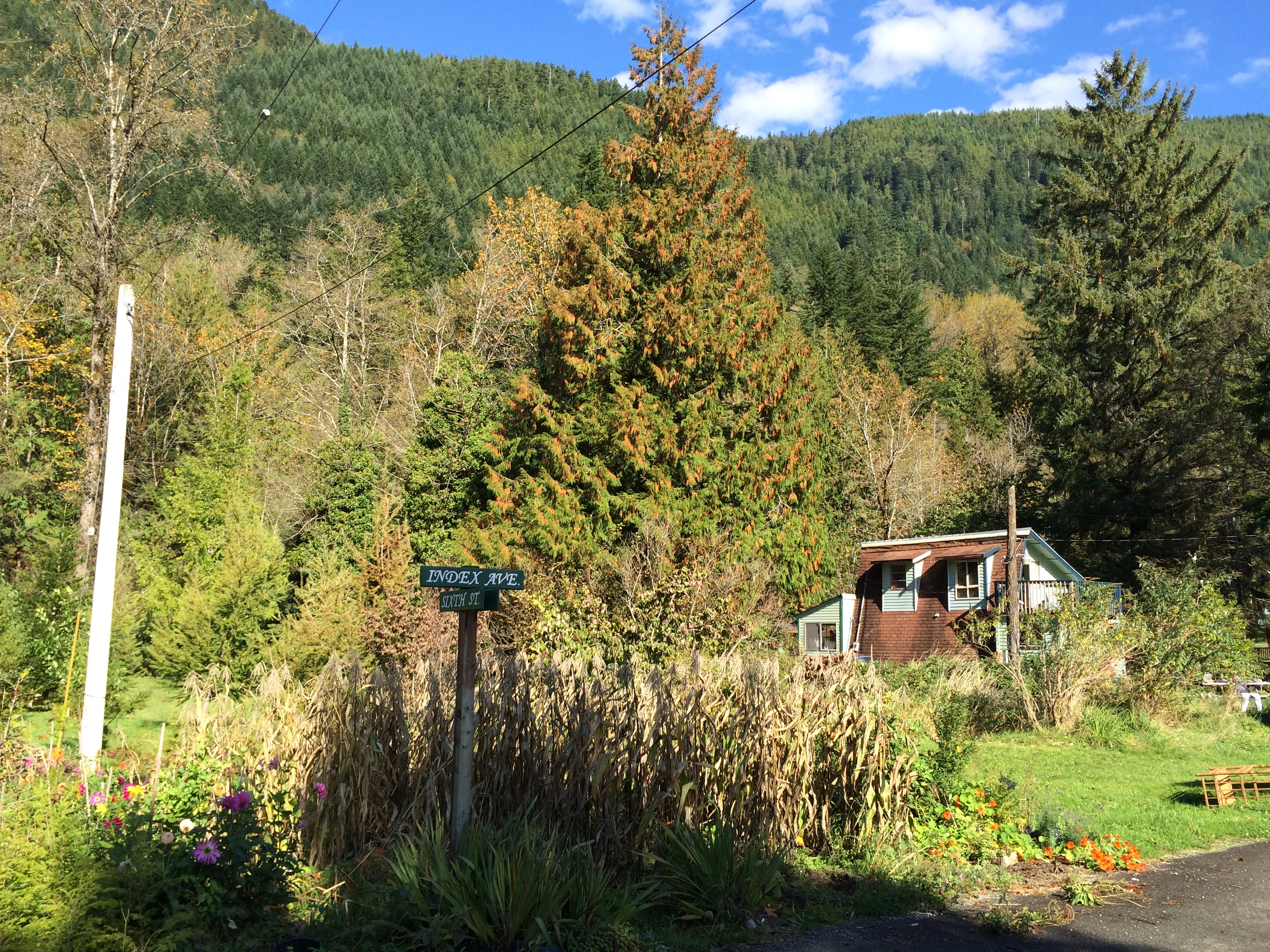
Former site of the building, 2014

== See also ==
- List of Improved Order of Red Men buildings and structures
- National Register of Historic Places listings in Snohomish County, Washington
