= Forks of the Sky State Park =

State park in Washington (state), United States

Coordinates: 47.826°N 121.559°W

- Interactive map of Forks of the Sky State Park
- Area: 1,300-acre (530 ha)
- Operator: Washington State Park System

Forks of the Sky State Park is a 1,300-acre (530 ha) element of the Washington State Park System on the Skykomish River and adjacent to U.S. Highway 2, near Index, Washington. Although a separate park, it is administered by Wallace Falls State Park farther west on Highway 2. The Index Town Wall, a popular 1,200-foot (370 m) rock climbing and BASE jumping wall with 500 climbing routes documented by 2003, was acquired by the state in 2010, and is part of the park. The base of the wall has a blocked tunnel created by the test of a tunnel boring machine that was sent to dig under the English Channel. The Wild Sky Wilderness can be reached through the state park.
