= Bridal Veil Falls (Washington) =

Waterfall in Washington (state), United States

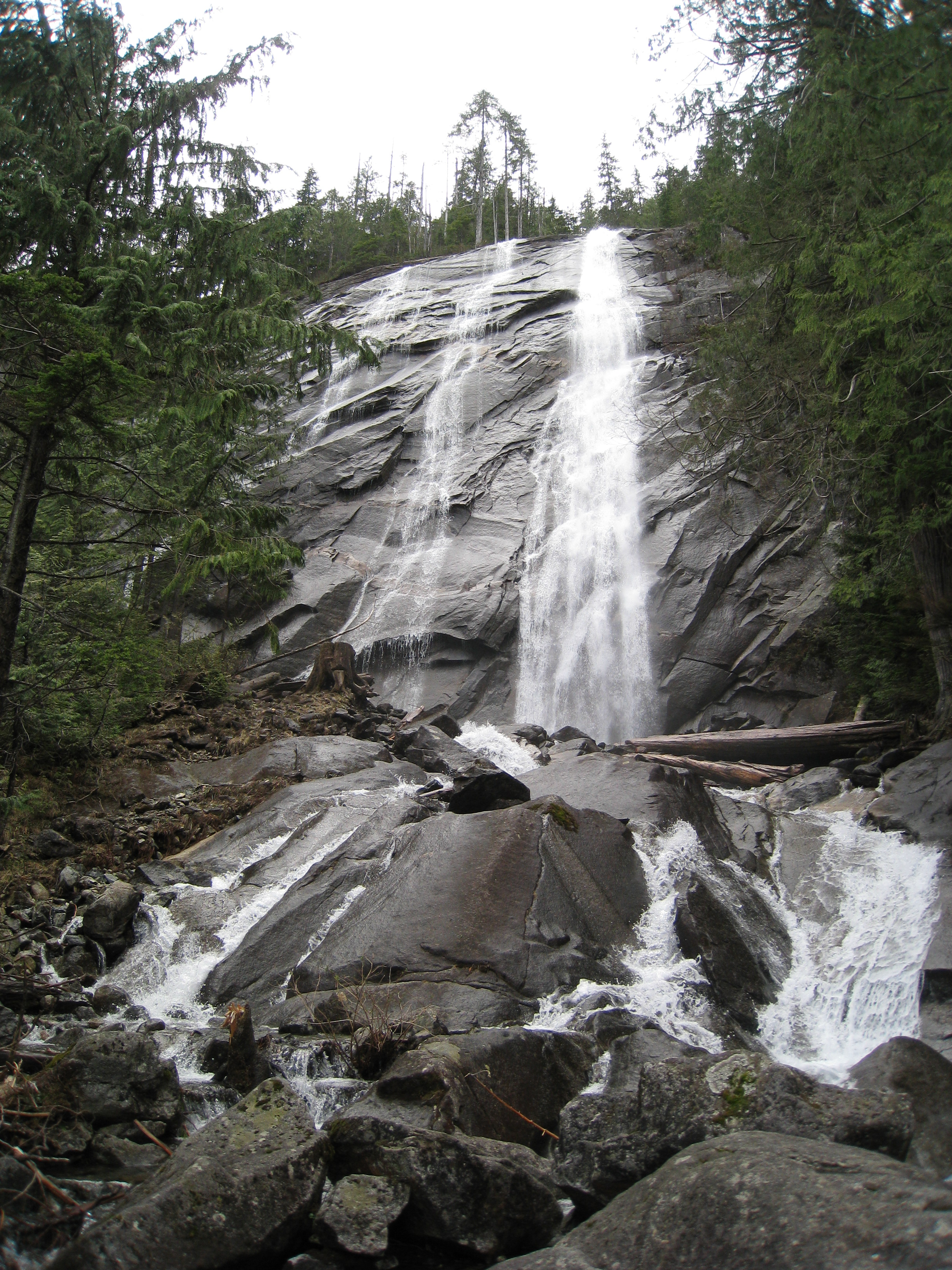
- Interactive map of Bridal Veil Falls
- Location: Snohomish County, Washington
- Coordinates: 47.78950°N 121.56924°W
- Type: Tiered Horsetails
- Total height: 1,291 ft (393 m)
- Number of drops: 7
- Longest drop: 322 ft (98 m)
- Watercourse: Bridal Veil Creek
- Average flow rate: 40 cu ft/s (1.1 m^{3}/s)

Bridal Veil Falls is a 1,328-foot (405 m) waterfall that flows from Lake Serene directly to the South Fork Skykomish River on the creek of the same name in the U.S. state of Washington. It is a perennial 150-foot (46 m) wide drop with four tiers, two of which (350 feet (110 m) and 250 feet (76 m), respectively) are clearly visible. It is at 47.78950°N 121.56924°W.

Bridal Veil Falls is part of the Mount Baker-Snoqualmie National Forest. A hiking trail leads from a parking area to the falls.

== See also ==
- List of waterfalls
