= Bolt Creek fire =

2022 wildfire in Washington, U.S.

Bolt Creek Fire
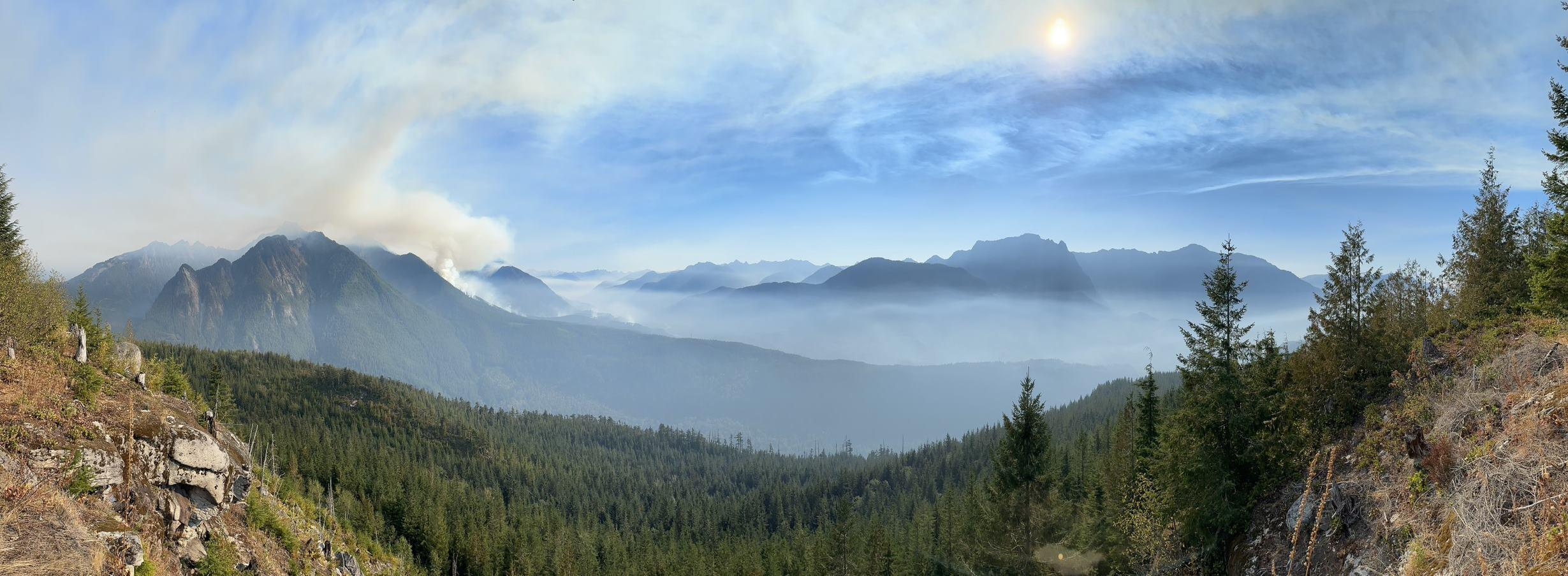
- Smoke plume from Heybrook Ridge Lookout
- Date: September 9, 2022 – October 31, 2022
- Location: Cascade Mountain Range; King & Snohomish County, Washington, U.S.
- Coordinates: 47.7283°N 121.3461°W

Statistics
- Burned area: 14,451 acres (58.48 km^{2})
- Land use: Forested mountains

Impacts
- Evacuated: multiple communities
- Structures lost: 1 outbuilding
- Cost: US$8.7 million

Ignition
- Cause: Human caused
- Motive: Accidental

Map
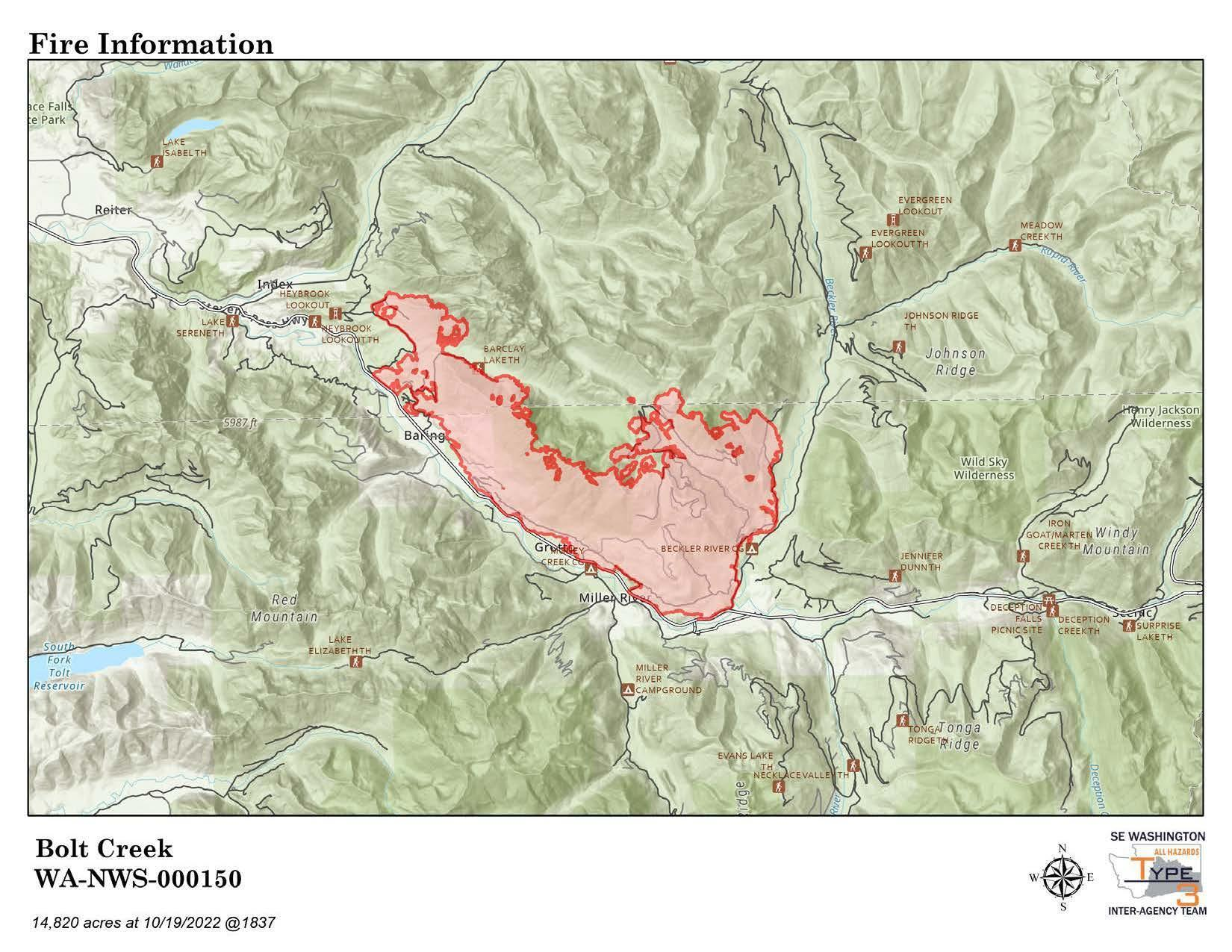
- Fire perimeter

- Bolt Creek Fire

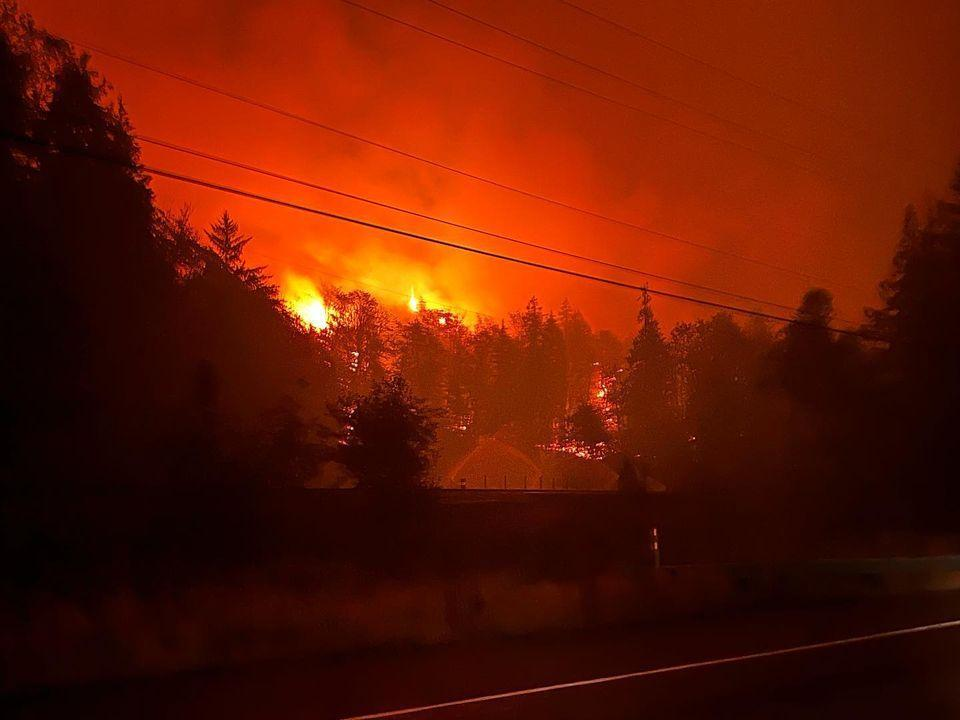
Night view of fire on ridges above U.S. Route 2

The Bolt Creek Fire was a large wildfire on the western slopes of the Cascade Mountains in Washington along U.S. Route 2 in 2022. It burned north of the towns of Index, Grotto and Skykomish in northern King and southern Snohomish counties from September 9 through late October when changes in the weather extinguished it. During the fire, U.S. Route 2 was closed for prolonged periods of time forcing traffic to detour across passes to the south and north, trapping some local communities with no alternative exits, and severely impacting regional air quality for multiple days. The total cost of the fire and post-event mitigation is estimated to have been $8.7 million. Following the fire, the section of U.S. Route 2 running along the burn scar was deemed a higher risk for flash flooding, with the risk expected to diminish over an estimated five year period. The lack of alternate routes through the section, due to the closure of the Old Cascade Highway, was again brought into public discussion.

== Background ==
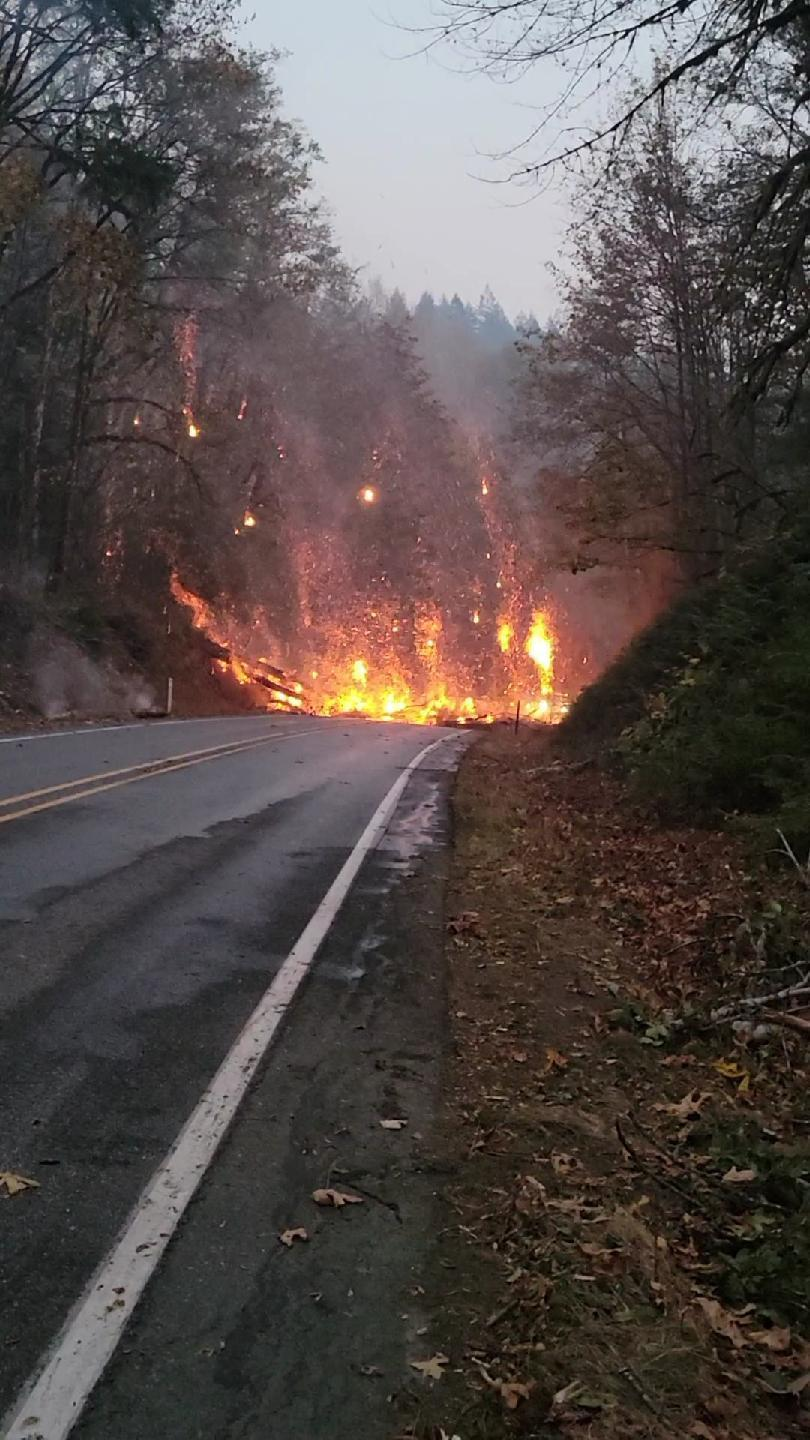
Burning debris blocking U.S. Route 2

The Old Cascade Highway which runs roughly parallel to U.S. Route 2 intermittently between Index and Skykomish was once used as an alternative route by traffic in the Route 2 corridor when the main route was congested or blocked. However, in 2011, heavy flooding created a washout along the Old Cascade Highway resulting in its permanent closure as an alternative through route between the East Fork of the Miller River and the Miller River bridge. The only road access left was the Money Creek Bridge west of Skykomish. While the area has about six full-time residents, it contains a number of vacation and summer home properties as well that can increase the population to 60. Back country outdoor activities such as hiking and camping add an uncertain further number of people.

In the lead up to September 2022 the region had a typical volume of precipitation for the year. Unlike in prior years however, spring was noted to be cooler and wetter than average, which was then followed by a summer of hotter and dryer conditions than average. The dry weather set in on the Summer solstice and ushered in the driest summer on record. The concentration of rain into the late winter and early spring allowed the forests on the Cascades west slopes to become unusually dry and susceptible to fire. In the week leading up to that labor day weekend a red flag warning had been issues across the region.

== Fire ==
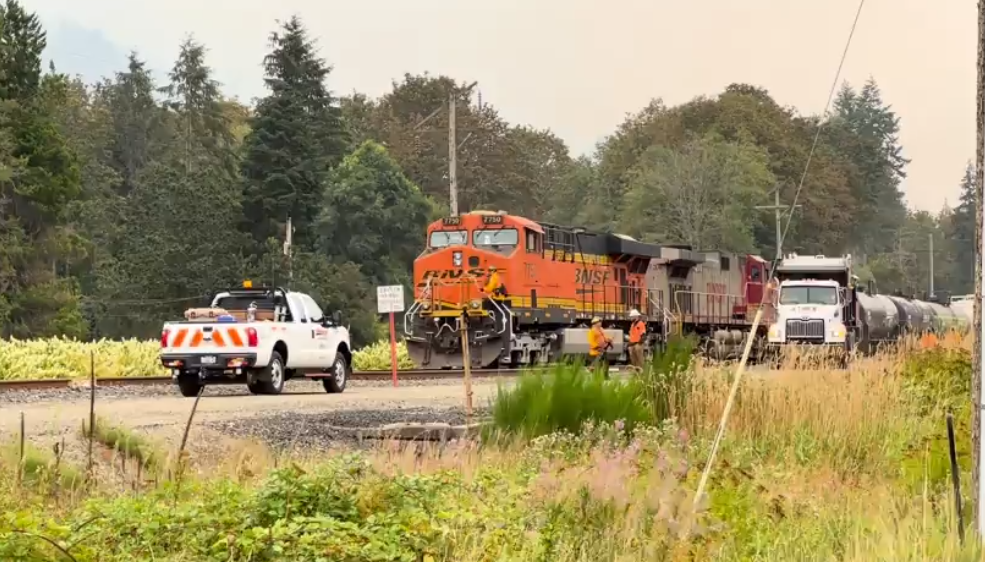
BNSF fire train at Gold Bar, 2022

The fire started around 5:00 p.m. Pacific Daylight Time on September 9 on a property along Bolt Creek Road, a location approximately 2.4 km (1.5 mi) north of Skykomish. The steep terrain where the fire was burning meant that much of the area was roadless and inaccessible to fire engines. The steep slopes across much of the region also created rolling fire debris hazards for anyone downslope. As such, the majority of the fire was left to burn under watch without any heavy intervention.

By September 11, a 17 mi (27 km) section of U.S. Route 2 between Zeke's Drive-in, located east of Gold Bar, to the eastern city limits of Skykomish had been closed. This was combined with mandatory evacuations between Index and Skykomish. The fire had been growing very rapidly with expansion from under 1,000 acres (400 ha) between to 3,000 and 5,000 acres (1,200 and 2,000 ha) recorded over a 12 hour period. Around 200 Washington firefighters from across the state had responded to the fire by September 11. Westerly blowing winds carried ashes out to the Puget Sound with ash fall in Everett and Marysville plus orange smokey sky across the region. The world air quality index recorded "moderate" to "very unhealthy" air conditions for locations in the region. At 3:00 p.m. on September 10, a countywide evacuation alert was sent by the Snohomish County Department of Emergency Management by error. The alert was meant to be much smaller, only targeting the area between Index and Skykomish and an estimated 300-400 homes, but was instead sent to all residents in Snohomish County. A helicopter rescue crew patrolling for stranded hikers in the vicinity of the fire on September 10 was forced to abandon the area due to heavy air turbulence from the fire.

The BNSF Railway coordinated with the incident teams in the deployment of one of its fire trains along the Bolt Creek perimeter between September 11 and 13. The fire train consisted of tank cars, a "fire" car, and a modified caboose, from which electricity was supplied to the pumps of the fire car. Upon deployment, the fire train took on a crew of firefighters, and slowly moved through the rail corridor to be protected. The 30,000 US gal (110,000 L; 25,000 imp gal) tank cars carried loads of either water or fire retardant which was sprayed with the fire car hoses up to 30 ft (9.1 m) away onto active fires or on areas needing protection. During the fire trains work along the Bolt Creek perimeter, focus was made to protect railway infrastructure, bridges, overpasses, and other assets that might have been burned. Additional sprinkler systems were emplaced on wooden bridges for longer term protections that the retardant spraying was not able to cover.

As of September 13, Skykomish had not been ordered to evacuate, but power to the region had been turned off by the Bonneville Power Administration for a period to prevent additional hazards in the fire. It was restored to town on September 13. An evacuation order which had been issued for Index was lifted and some people were returning to that area.

U.S. Route 2 was closed though September 19 due to proximity of the firelines to rail, road and infrastructure. Work was concentrated along the southern margins of the fire, while growth along the northern margins was unimpeded and allowed to burn into the southern areas of the Wild Sky Wilderness.

On September 30, an estimated 12,070 acres (4,880 ha) of mostly National Forest Service owned land had been burned with varying degrees of severity. The fire burned though conifer and hardwood timber, timber litter, and hardwood litter. Some areas encompassed by the fire had no documented historical record of having burned before. All of the area was second growth timber, the Old Growth forest having been logged years to decades ago. Assessment by the Washington Geological Surveys Wildfire-Associated Landslide Emergency Response Team took place over September 27 to 29 even though continuing fire activity across the area limited the teams access. The team examined the areas effected by fire along both U.S. Route 2 and Forest Service road 6510. Based on the Burned Area Reflectance Classification procedures and datasets, by September 30 around 16% (1,803 acres (730 ha)) of the total burn was of high severity and an estimated 32% (3,790 acres (1,530 ha)) was moderately burned. An overall estimate of just over half the burn area, at 51% (5,918 acres (2,395 ha)), was between low burn severity and wholly unburned but within the fire perimeter.

Official confirmation was released on October 2 that the incident management team had determined the fire was human caused, but the exact nature of the fire ignition as not known. The team stated exact cause was likely not going to be determined for weeks or months. As of that morning, estimates of the fire size were around 12,486 acres (5,053 ha) and containment hovered near 36%. All evacuations and warnings were lifted by October 2 and access to most of the area restored. Only areas within the burn zone itself were still off limits, and U.S. Route 2 while open was operating with a speed restriction of 35 miles per hour in the fire zone.

Reporting on October 11 noted that the fire had burned an around 13,000 acres (5,300 ha) and was only an estimated 36% contained. Due to both the continuing fire burning too close to roads and to fire damaged trees falling, U.S. Route 2 had been impacted by repeated intermittent closures. The fire was being managed by a crew of 200 wildlands firefighters at that time. On the ground hand powered work by fire crews and bulldozers were employed along with relying on preexisting barriers such as roads and streams to try to contain the fire. Problem areas were managed with helicopter and small plane water drops.

October 20 saw a shift in the prevailing weather patterns with the first notable rain of fall and a spike in the relative humidity into the 70% range, up from the 20% range had been hovering at. The fire had burned though private, federal, Tulalip tribal, and state lands from the base of Heybrook Ridge on the west to the Beckler River Campground on the east and from the Skykomish River on the south north into the Wild Sky Wilderness. This totaled up to an estimated 22.8 sq mi (59 km^{2}) with growth in the first week blowing up over 10,000 acres. The fire was monitored, but due to the mountain terrain, it was left to burn until fall precipitation put it out fully. With the onset of fall and increased rain, landslides and increased tree falls were a noted problem. By November 20 repeated rain and snow events had already resulted in burn scar threats with a flash flood threat issued for the burn scar during an October 25, 2022 storm.

The combination of mountain and valley terrain where the Bolt Creek Fire burned in conjunction with a small established rural population lead to large areas of limited to zero cellular or internet accessibility. In an effort to support communication needs of the agencies combating the fire, Snohomish County deployed several "Mobile Information Technology Response Units". The units were built into trailers that could be towed to areas needing infrastructure support, the units having cell, internet and power generation capacities, and were used to link into regional networks and create hotspots for emergency responders. Reporting by the Everett Herald on October 10 noted that during the fire, the Espresso Chalet, a location set for the 1987 Harry and the Hendersons and 2021 The Stairs films, offered free coffee to the fire crews and acted as a local trapline for information, passing it from Public Information Officers to visitors of the stand and posting to the stand's Facebook page. Fire crews from across western Washington, Spokane, Oregon, Utah, and Mexico City were deployed on the fire. The fire was noted to likely be one of the largest that had happed in Snohomish County.

== Air quality impacts ==
Puget Sound regional air conditions were showing improvement by October 2 with the Puget Sound Clean Air Agency anticipating "moderate" to "good" air quality over the weekend, though "unhealthy for sensitive groups" conditions would likely persist nearer to the fire. However over then next few weeks air quality remained spotty. Wind currents in the greater Puget sound area had pulled smoke from the fire westward into the Seattle area lowlands during the weeks of the fire. The lingering smoke built up resulting in several days which IQAir ranked air quality among the top cities or leading the list of regions with the worst air conditions in the world. October 19 and 20 saw Seattle ranking among IQAir's top 10 worst air quality conditions globally, rising and falling in ranking repeatedly over the 48 hour period. Conditions resulted in the worst air quality for most of October 19 before being overtaken by Beijing, China. Ongoing air quality advisories had been issued a week earlier and extended several times due to the stagnant air. During the worst of the air quality conditions the Puget Sound Clean Air Agency recommended regional residents stay indoors as much as possible to avoid the smoke, with air quality index readings of "226", equating to "very unhealthy" on the Environmental Protection Agencies assessment scale.

== Aftermath ==
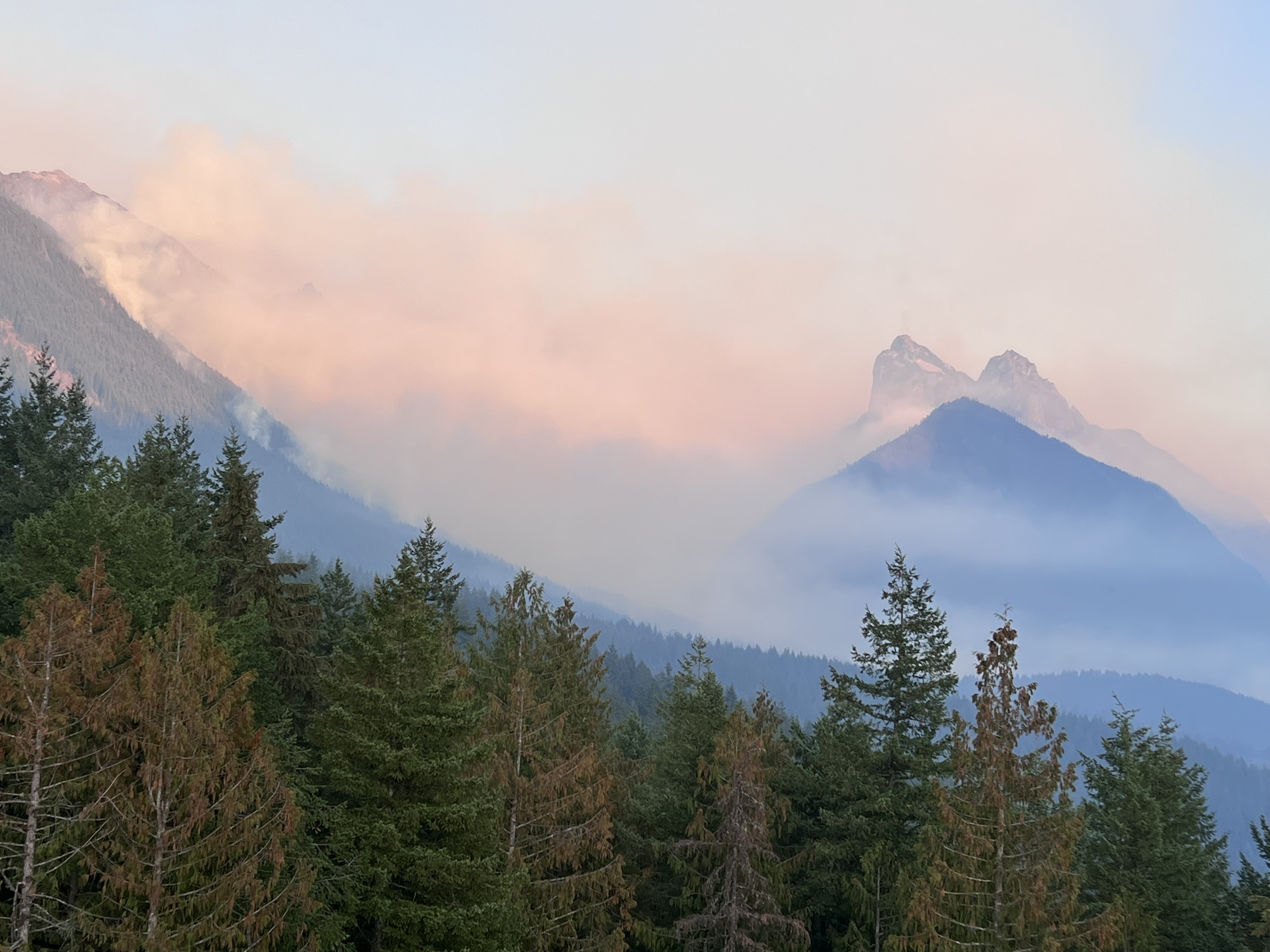
View of the fire area from Heybrook Ridge Lookout

Washington Department of Natural Resources reporting classified the 2022 fire season as the largest for Western Washington since modern recording was started in 1984. Nearly double the total volume of acres, 54,300 acres (22,000 ha), burned compared to the prior two large western Washington fire seasons in 2020 and 2017. It also noted that the overall trend in western Washington fire seasons was that of increasing acres burning over time with larger fire seasons, a situation caused by increased drought frequency and drier forest conditions from climate change. The fire and subsequent effects from the burn scar resulted in a total cost placed at $8.7 million in containment cost, equivalent to $10 million in 2026.

A November 2022 King County ordinance estimated a monthly average of 180,000 vehicles were crossing the U.S. Route 2 corridor and impacted by the Bolt Creek Fire closures. During the periods of U.S. 2 closure east-west traffic was shifted from a 45 minute drive to a 5 hour drive at the shortest. The quickest alternative route involved moving south to Interstate 90 and Snoqualmie Pass then turning north on U.S. Route 97 over Blewett Pass and then back onto U.S. 2.

A series of nine drainage basin areas with distinct alluvial fans were inspected by the USFS BAER team and assessed for the possibilities of post fire flash floods or debris flows. Five of the alluvial fan areas were deemed to be of high risk, with impacts possible to residential housing in the Grotto area, Bonneville Power Association lines, U.S. Route 2, and the BNSF railway on various fans. Additionally, signage was recommended at the camping areas on Beckler River, Buck Creek, and Bolt Creek warning of potential flash flooding or debris flows from the slopes above. Studies of the surface soil behavior in the burn scar show a marked difference in behavior due to the ash content left on the surface and in subsurface layers of the ground. Surface ash was noted to be hydrophilic and retained more water from precipitation, it was also more mobile then unburned surface matter, The subsurface ash is also hydrophilic, and acts as a barrier reducing the volume of water reaching unburned soils.

The King County ordinance also called out the Bolt Creek burn scar as a major source of road closures in the years after 2022 due to tree falls, debris flows, and other slope instability issues. The first flash flood threat was identified in the scar October 25, 2022 and warning have been issued since, such as during the 2025 Pacific Northwest floods when the Washington Emergency Management Division issued a high risk assessment for the Burn Scar based on the estimated rain fall volumes. Washington State Department of Transportation addressed the potential issues by closing some endangered roads, placing warning signs along U.S. Route 2, and removing approximately 500 trees along the highway corridor in the scar. The threat was estimated to slowly dissipate over the two to five years post-fire, but would continue to be exacerbated by ongoing climate change.

The limited road access to the unincorporated Money Creek area west of the Miller River was not considered a major problem until access out of the area was cut off by the Bolt Creek Fire. The 2022 ordinance also called for study of the options and costs for addressing the evacuation problem for the community. The subsequent report focused mostly on the costs and problems which replacement of the East Miller River Bridge would incur. While all the options that were not already in place and budgeted for, such as search & rescue or helicopter flights, were considered "prohibitively expensive", the report deemed that reconnection with the existing bridge span was the most reasonable of the options.
