= Sultan Senior High School =

Location
- 13715 310th Ave S.E. Sultan, Washington 98294; United States; 47.8729°N 121.8134°W

Information
- Type: Public high school
- School district: Sultan School District
- NCES School ID: 530855002168
- Principal: Sarita Whitmire-Skeith
- Teaching staff: 26.76 (on an FTE basis)
- Grades: 9–12
- Enrollment: 583 (2022-2023)
- Student to teacher ratio: 21.79
- Colors: Navy, Columbia Blue, White
- Athletics conference: Independent (2A)
- Nickname: Turks
- Website: shs.sultanschools.org

Sultan Senior High School is a public high school in Sultan, Washington, United States. It is part of the Sultan School District.
