= Lake Serene =

Lake in Snohomish County, Washington, United States

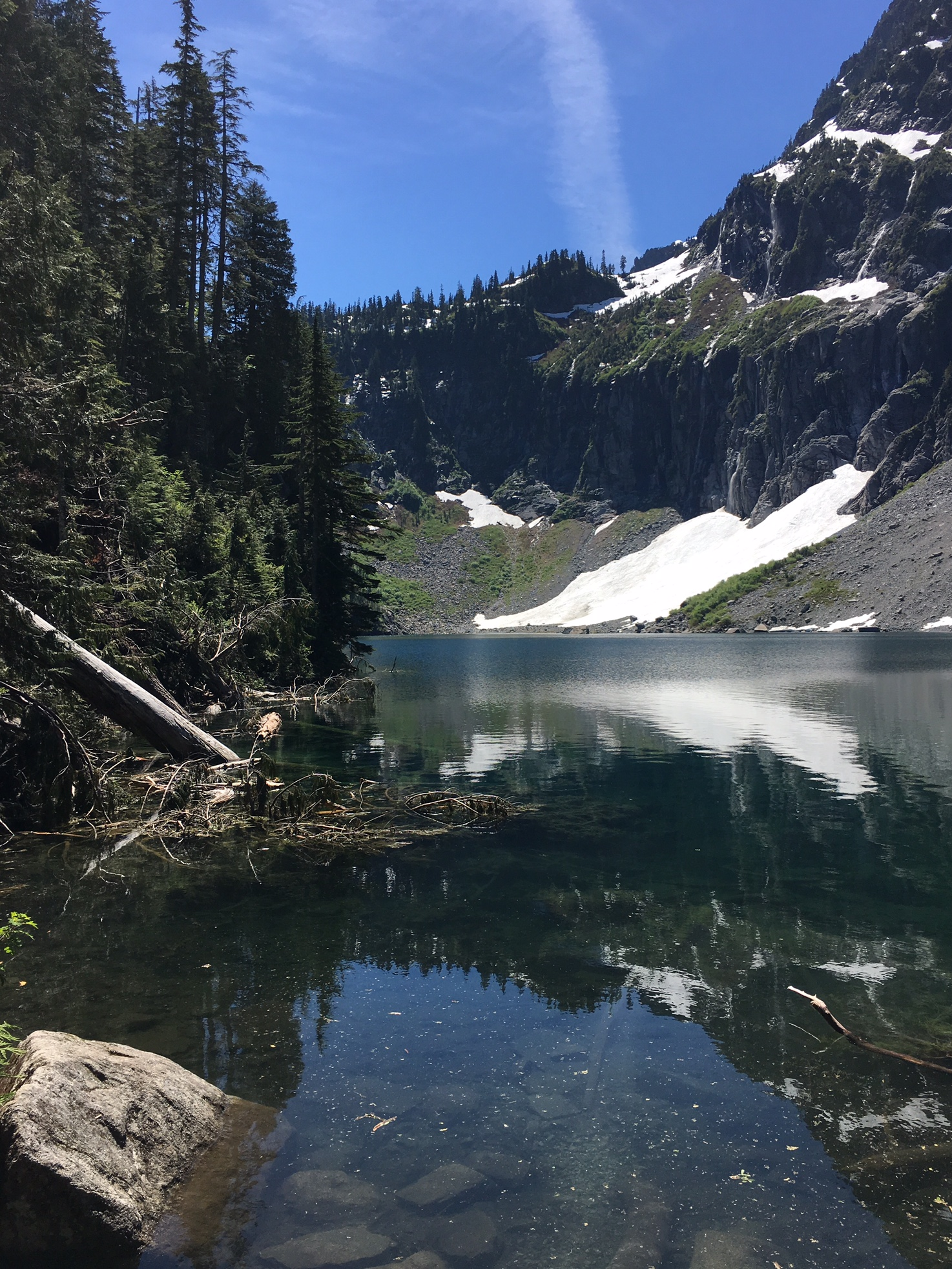
- Lake as viewed from trail.

- Location within Washington (state) Location within the United States
- Location: Snohomish County, Washington
- Coordinates: 47°46′55″N 121°34′13″W
- Type: Glacial
- Basin countries: United States
- Surface area: 53 acres (21 ha)
- Surface elevation: 2,526 ft (770 m)
- Islands: 0

Lake Serene is an alpine lake located in Snohomish County, Washington near Mount Index and above Bridal Veil Falls. The lake is a popular area for hiking and fishing.

== See also ==
- Bridal Veil Falls
- Skykomish River
