= Coven Celeste =

Gardnerian Wiccan coven in Canada

- Founded: 1966; 60 years ago
- Founders: Heather Botting
- Services: Witchcraft
- Website: covenceleste.com

Coven Celeste was the first official Gardnerian Wiccan coven in Canada, founded in the late 1960s by Heather Botting, then wife of the grandson of Gerald Gardner's London-based High Priestess Lysbeth Turner, Gary Botting. Following Heather's initiation by Turner in 1966, she became a founding priestess of Aquarian Tabernacle Church and later, as a professor of anthropology, became the first Wiccan chaplain to be recognized by an accredited university (University of Victoria).

== History ==
=== Origin ===
Gary Botting's interest in the occult was fueled by his research as an English major into the life and death of Christopher Marlowe, especially Marlowe's best-known play, Doctor Faustus. Botting later wrote two plays about The School of Night, a clandestine Elizabethan club dedicated to delving into the occult, membership in which included Marlowe and such notables as Sir Walter Raleigh, Baron Cobham, the Earl of Northumberland, Thomas Kyd, and Thomas Harriott. Because of the severe social strictures placed upon them by Jehovah's Witnesses, including fear of being disfellowshipped, the Bottings stayed in the "broom closet," discussing their new faith only with fellow practicing pagans. Gary Botting later depicted the early formation of the coven and its barely disguised principals in his play The Succubus, produced as a major project by the University of Alberta Department of Drama in 1982. When after Lysbeth Turner's death in 1968 Botting's mother discovered the extent of her mother's Wiccan proclivities, she publicly burned most of the pagan artifacts and images that Turner had left behind in a bid to purge her house of "Satan's" influence.

=== Development and growth ===
Coven Celeste and came to full development after the Bottings moved to Alberta in 1970. Heather Botting taught "Witchcraft and the Occult" at Red Deer College. By 1974, Coven Celeste was drawing witches from all over the west of Canada to its central "covenstead" in Sylvan Lake, Alberta. True to the Gardnerian tradition, rituals, especially sabbats, were performed in the nude. The Bottings purchased properties in Sylvan Lake, Burnt Lake, Alix and Bentley, Alberta with heavy woods either on or adjacent to their land, and made paths through the woods to hidden altars and sacred circles. As the coven expanded, nudity became optional and it was recognized that all witches were "naked under their gowns." Before long, floor-length gowns had become the norm. Major rituals were conducted outdoors in the nearby woods except in the dead of winter. The original rituals were created by Heather Botting ("Lady Aurora") and Gary Botting ("Lord Pan") using eclectic sources, including adaptations of the rituals of Jessie Wicker Bell (better known as "Lady Sheba") as published in The Grimoire of Lady Sheba.

Commencing in 1975, the Alberta coven began to "hive", with different members of the coven moving away, taking Coven Celeste's traditional brand of Gardnerian witchcraft with them. Pagan-oriented visitors who had heard of Coven Celeste were made welcome either as observers or participants, and Coven Celeste's influence spread. Michele Favarger of Cobble Hill, BC attended Coven Celeste rituals in Alberta in 1982 and subsequently returned to BC to form the Canadian Aquarian Tabernacle Church ("ATC") on Vancouver Island, basing it on some of the precepts of Coven Celeste. Later, in British Columbia, the coven incorporated many of the rituals of Starhawk as published in The Spiral Dance. In 1993, Gary Botting, who by then had become established as a criminal lawyer in Victoria, BC, represented Starhawk and dozens of other Wiccans charged with criminal contempt of court following the Clayoquot protests against logging in the Clayoquot Sound on Vancouver Island. Subsequently, the Bottings, Favarger, and Favarger's partner and high priest Erik Lindblad successfully campaigned the Province of British Columbia to recognize Wiccan weddings. By 1995 Coven Celeste had become one of the mainstay covens of Temple of the Lady in Victoria, BC.

== Coven Celeste today ==
The Bottings were divorced in 1999, and the following year Heather married Denis O'Brien, the high priest of Circle of the Moonsong; whereupon Coven Celeste was transferred to Alexander Astarte, along with the secrets of its sacred tools, the athame, white handled knife, pentacle, scourge, cauldron, candle holders, candles, censor, Book of Shadows, and wands cut and manufactured by them under the supervision of their founder. In 2010, Lady Aurora was still conducting a prison ministry and as High Priestess of ATC was officially recognized by the Province as an officiator of pagan weddings. As a professor of anthropology at the University of Victoria, Heather Botting was an officially recognized Wiccan chaplain there for more than a decade, the first officially recognized Wiccan chaplain in any university in North America.

== See also ==
- Neopagan witchcraft
- Wiccan organisation
