= Children of Artemis =

UK-based witchcraft organisation

- Formation: 1995; 31 years ago

The Children of Artemis is a UK-based witchcraft membership organisation that organises Witchfests; regular Wiccan and witchcraft themed festivals and conferences, periodically held in London, Glasgow and Cardiff. They publish the magazine Witchcraft & Wicca.

== History ==
The Children of Artemis (CoA) first started out as a ritual group. The CoA continued as a small group until 1995, when it was transformed into a public membership organisation. Initially it grew slowly until around 1999–2000, and then with the established of CoA's website, magazine and events, CoA quickly became market leaders.

=== Structure ===
CoA is staffed almost entirely by volunteers, who are given responsibility for their areas of expertise, which includes Witchfests, the magazine, the website, and all other areas of the organisation. It has no hierarchy, no titles, and as there are no political positions, it holds no elections. It is a religious organisation dedicated to Wicca and Witchcraft with divinity in the form of the Goddess and God.

== Community activities ==
The core Children of Artemis team helped the Pagan Federation organise their conferences in 1997 and 1998. This period lasted two years, during which CoA did not develop as its resources were being fully utilised helping the other organisation. The PF president took personal control of the conference in 1999, this allowed CoA to focus back onto its own development. The first Witchfest event came three years later in November 2002. Witchfest events have included speakers such as Inbaal.

The Coven finding service was ceased in 2003, as there were not enough Covens accepting trainees. To attempt to address this lack of opportunity, CoA has run "Wicca Introduced" courses twice a year, and now funds a few Open Rituals.

Children of Artemis was one of the founding members of the Pagan Symposium, a group of Pagan and Heathen Organisations that actively co-operate on a variety of issues and projects. Children of Artemis also hosts the Pagan Symposium's website for the community.

CoA sponsors and helps organise a variety of independent community events.

In 2021 some of their members were consulted in connection with the British Museum exhibition Feminine Power: the divine to the demonic.

== Criticism ==
According to some members of both the Pagan and non-Pagan communities, CoA's attempts to mass market itself has not made it popular with several other pagan and Wicca or Witchcraft organisations.

=== Aesthetic considerations ===
The magazine, "Witchcraft & Wicca", published by the Children of Artemis. Issue 18, Lammas 2009.

Critics of the CoA have raised concerns about the image that their magazine puts across: the magazine "Witchcraft & Wicca" is glossier than most of the publications produced by pagan groups in the UK, and appears to be aimed at a younger target audience, and features large quantities of crushed velvet and similar "spooky" dress. It is argued that this has a detrimental effect on the public perception of Paganism, detracting from its status as an accepted religion, and promoting it as a lifestyle choice.

== See also ==
- Neopagan witchcraft
- Wiccan organisation
