= Inbaal =

Israeli-born British psychic, and Wiccan priestess

Inbaal Honigman
- Born: March 15, 1974 (age 52); Haifa, Israel
- Occupations: Tarot reader, astrologer, psychic, Wiccan priestess
- Spouse: Sean (m. 2007)
- Children: 4
- Website: inbaal.com

Inbaal Honigman (born 15 March 1974) is an Israeli-born British psychic and Wiccan Priestess. She has been seen on television programs such as Big Brother's Little Brother, House Busters, and Most Haunted. She has also been Elle magazine's astrologer in the UK and has acted as guest astrologer for Elle magazine in Japan on several occasions.

Inbaal originally became interested in becoming a witch during the 1990s, sparked by a love of Tarot cards. From there, she developed her skills as a psychic and tarot reader.

== Career ==
Inbaal began working as a tarot reader in the 1990s. She later expanded her work into astrology and spiritual consulting, providing private readings, horoscope services, and public consultations, and participating in psychic entertainment events.

She has contributed astrology and tarot commentary to BBC Radio, LBC, and Talksport. She has been featured by various major publications, including GQ, The Times, Elle, News of the World, Marie Claire, The Daily Mail, and Woman & Home.

Inbaal has collaborated with Tarotoo to develop its AI tarot logic and has served as a spokesperson for the platform.

She has appeared on television programmes, including Big Brother’s Little Brother (2003), Most Haunted (2004), House Busters (2004), The Wheelhouse (2006), and 4thought.tv (2010). She has also appeared on Coast to Coast AM.

== Media commentary ==
Inbaal has provided astrology-based commentary for lifestyle and entertainment media, including horoscope analysis, zodiac compatibility features, and interpretations of astrological events. She has also contributed commentary on workplace behaviour, dream interpretation, and relationship compatibility.

Her commentary has been used in coverage of public figures, including members of the British royal family and political figures such as Melania Trump and Prince Harry.

She has also provided commentary on political and cultural events, including the 2024 United States presidential election, and comparative personality interpretations of public figures such as Meghan Markle and Beyoncé.

== Predictions in the Media ==
From May to July 2003, Inbaal appeared on Big Brother’s Little Brother, where she was part of the "Eviction Prediction" panel every Friday, her job being to predict who was to leave the house, using only her psychic ability. She predicted more evictions correctly than any psychic on the panel.

Articles in magazines such as Woman & Home and Here's Health described Inbaal's psychic readings alongside other psychics, and her reviews have been positive, praising both her accuracy and kind manner.

She has also featured as a regular psychic presenter on Sky TV in the UK on the Psychic and Soul channel, and on the Psychic Interactive channel's various programmes.

In 2007, The Observer ran a betting competition, each week pitting a psychic against a reader or a zoo animal, and a professional sports pundit, to see who would make the highest profit from an allocated £500 with their respective sports predictions. The competitors were replaced every month. At the end of a year, it transpired that Inbaal has done better than any of the other psychics. As the top psychic in the competition, she was invited back for a champion-of-champions round in 2008, where she came second to Jenny McCririck, a professional sports pundit, despite having a higher hit rate than her.

== Media Wiccan ==
In 2004, she appeared on the Living programme Most Haunted for an episode entitled "Witchfinder General".

She appeared on Channel 4's 4thought.tv programme strand on 30 July 2010, speaking on Wicca and spells from an urban witch perspective.

She has been featured as a speaker at the annual Witchfest festivals put on by the Children of Artemis, She also appeared on the cover of Witchcraft & Wicca Magazine.

In 2022, Inbaal interviewed with Galactic Center astrologer Ellie Adams of Saturn Season for a YouTube channel called Let's F With Astrology, discussing astrological correlations in the tarot.

In 2024, Inbaal interviewed with The Yorkshire Post, in which she described witchcraft as a personal spiritual practice involving ritual and belief in manifestation.

== Criticisms ==
In 2009, The Guardian newspaper in the UK asked Inbaal to predict the ultimate fate of five Premiership football teams at the end of the season. It transpired that she made one correct and four incorrect predictions, but claimed that she had been asked by the newspaper not to make the "obvious choices".

== Personal life ==
Inbaal married Sean in 2007. They have four children.

== Filmography ==
=== Television ===
Year	Title	Role / Credit	Ref
1990–1993	The World Tonight (Ha-Olam Ha’Erev)	Guest appearance	
2003	Big Brother’s Little Brother	Panel contributor, eviction prediction segments	
2004	Most Haunted	Guest appearance	
2004	Housebusters	White Witch	
2006	The Wheelhouse	Mysticism consultant	
2010	4thought.tv	Guest contributor	
2020–2023	Steph’s Packed Lunch	Guest contributor	

=== Podcasts ===
Year	Title	Role / Credit	Ref
2024	Predict the Week	Host / executive producer	
2024	Switched On with Louise Tighe	Guest	
2024	End of the Road	Guest	
2024	Psychic Brunch with Inbaal Honigman and Laura Daligan	Guest	
