= Blue Star Wicca =

Wiccan tradition developed in the 1970s

- A blue septegram is used as the symbol of the Blue Star tradition.
- Abbreviation: BSW, B*
- Type: Wicca
- Classification: British Traditional Wicca (loosely)
- Region: Mostly in United States
- Founder: Frank Dufner
- Origin: 1970s Philadelphia, Pennsylvania
- Members: Around 1,000 (United States), 100–200 (outside United States)

Blue Star Wicca is one of a number of Wiccan traditions, and was created in the United States in the 1970s based loosely on the Gardnerian and Alexandrian traditions.

== Origins and history ==
The "Coven of the Blue Star" and the traditions was established in Philadelphia, Pennsylvania in 1975 by Frank Dufner. In 1980, on its membership application to the Covenant of the Goddess, the coven is described as practicing "Great American Nontraditional Collective Eclectic Wicca." Early hives from the original coven spread throughout the New York metropolitan area.

Tzipora Katz joined the coven in 1977 while with Frank Dufner, and was the original high priestess. Their marriage ended in 1983 when Katz became involved with folk musician Kenny Klein and released Moon Hooves in the Sand, which contained Blue Star liturgical music. From the years 1988 through 1992, the duo toured the US, and the couple helped found new covens while on the road. In 1992, Katz (as Tzipora Klein) published Celebrating Life: Rites of Passage For All Ages through Delphi Press. Klein published The Flowering Rod: Men, Sex and Spirituality in 1993, also through Delphi Press.

== Practices ==
Blue Star practitioners include music in their ritual and liturgy along with ritual feasting, the use of a septegram as a symbol rather than a pentagram, and initiatory tattooing. Blue Star and the Feri tradition are the only two large traditions of witchcraft to feature a septegram prominently in their symbolism. Blue Star rituals typically have a round altar in the centre of the circle of participants. The positioning and handling of the ritual tools on the altar is given special attention within the tradition.

The Blue Star tradition's theology allows for enough flexibility to allow polytheists, pantheists and monotheists to participate in the tradition, and rituals can involve prayer or invocation to Wiccan deities, the gods and goddesses of Pagan peoples, or deified abstractions.

== Relationship to other traditions ==
Blue Star Wicca was inspired at least in part by both the Gardnerian and Alexandrian traditions, and was influenced by the American Welsh tradition and the Pagan Way series of class material.

Blue Star has been cited as an influence on traditions such as Maidenhill Wicca and Braided Wheel; the Odyssean tradition is considered a "sister" or "cousin" tradition by adherents.
