= Panthean Temple =

Wiccan church

- Panthean Temple of Connecticut
- Nickname: PTC
- Formation: 1995; 31 years ago
- Founder: Rev. Alicia Lyon Folberth
- Founded at: New Haven, Connecticut

The Panthean Temple, abbreviated as PTC as the Panthean Temple of Connecticut, is located in New Haven County, Connecticut and was the first Pagan and Wiccan church to incorporate in the state of Connecticut under its first name of the "Pagan Community Church," and is a non-profit 501(c)3 religious organization. It was founded by Rev. Alicia Lyon Folberth, in 1995.^{[1]}

== Practices ==
The Panthean Temple is open to Witches and Pagans of all traditions who honor harm none, which they consider to be a universal tenet of all true spiritual paths. Their practices are devotional, and are primarily Odyssean tradition, although individual public rituals may vary depending on the people leading them and the traditions they practice, but do not consider themselves eclectic.^{[3]}

Panthean Temple Membership consists of several levels corresponding with participation: Affiliate, Full Membership, Outer Court, and Inner Court.^{[3]}

Odyssean Wicca has its roots within British Traditional Wicca but like the Wiccan Church of Canada^{[4]}, the temple's purpose is to provide public ministry services, such as open worship, rites of passage, and prison and hospital visitations. The Panthean Temple is notable for its large festival, "Beltaine: A Pagan Odyssey," which began in 1999.^{[2]}

== See also ==
- List of Pagan traditions
- Neopagan witchcraft
- Wiccan organisation

== Notes and references ==
1. Telesco, Patricia (2005). Cakes and Ale for the Pagan Soul: Spells, Recipes, and Reflections from Neopagan Elders and Teachers, She Moves in Mysterious Ways: The Goddess' Call to Service, by Rev. Alicia Folberth. Crossing Press. ISBN 1-58091-164-1.
2. Singer, Marian (2005). Dancing the Fire: A Guide to Neo-Pagan Festivals and Gatherings. Citadel Press. ISBN 0-8065-2534-7.
3. Folberth, Alicia. "About the Panthean Temple". Archived from the original on January 7, 2004.
4. Landstreet, Lynna. "A Brief History of the WCC and the Odyssean Tradition". Archived from the original on May 10, 2015.
