= UEW =

UEW may refer to:

- Union of Environment Workers
- United Electrical, Radio and Machine Workers of America
- Universal Eclectic Wicca
- University of Education, Winneba
