= Heather Botting =

Canadian anthropologist

- Born: Heather Denise Harden; 21 September 1948 (age 78); Newmarket, Ontario, Canada
- Spouse: Gary Botting

Academic background
- Education: University of Alberta
- Thesis: The Power and the Glory: The Symbolic Vision and Social Dynamic of Jehovah's Witnesses

Academic work
- Discipline: anthropology
- Sub-discipline: anthropology of religion
- Institutions: University of Victoria
- Notable works: The Orwellian World of Jehovah's Witnesses

Heather Denise Botting, née Harden, also known as Lady Aurora, (born 21 September 1948), is a professor of anthropology at the University of Victoria in British Columbia. The original high priestess of Coven Celeste, she is a founding elder of the Canadian Aquarian Tabernacle Church and was the first recognized Wiccan chaplain in a public university.

== Early life ==
Heather Harden was born in Newmarket, Ontario. She was brought up a Jehovah's Witness, living on a small farm on the outskirts of Newmarket, where her parents raised chickens, pigs and ponies. She was heavily involved in 4-H projects and showed the neighbor's Ayrshire cattle. At 14 she was involved in a near-fatal car accident, an experience which was to shape her future university research interests. At 15, she met her future husband, Gary Botting, at a cousin's wedding. Following the guidance of the Watchtower Bible and Tract Society, the legal entity used by Jehovah's Witnesses, she chose a vocational business track rather than an academic program in high school. Since their potential union suffered the disapprobation of their respective parents, Heather and Gary eloped in October, 1966—only to discover that nobody had noticed, and it became inconvenient to tell anyone. As a result, they got married a second time, this time publicly, on 1 April 1967 when they realized that "April Fool's Day" fell on a Saturday, thereby generating a self-perpetuating April Fool's joke. Only then did Heather return to high school, intent on eventually enrolling in university.

== The Orwellian World of Jehovah's Witnesses ==
Heather Botting attended Memorial University of Newfoundland and Trent University, majoring in anthropology. At the University of Alberta, she received the highest marks in the entire university, guaranteeing her a prestigious Killam Scholarship for graduate studies. She completed her Master of Arts and Ph.D. degrees in the anthropology of religion with research on Jehovah's Witnesses—the religion she had left behind. Her dissertation "The Power and the Glory: The Symbolic Vision and Social Dynamic of Jehovah's Witnesses" is an analysis of the power relations operative within Jehovah's Witnesses, focusing on a specific microsociety of individuals within the movement, "showing the levels of involvement, commitment, and status achieved within the sect by each person in the microsociety." The raw research data for her dissertation was collected over a nine-year period from 1973 to 1982, and continued to be collected until she and Gary published The Orwellian World of Jehovah's Witnesses through University of Toronto Press in 1984. The book is an exposé of "Witness history, beliefs, and social imperatives," but more importantly focuses on the shifting doctrines and "mental regulating" of Witnesses through isolationism and dogma, comparing the Watch Tower Society's closed social paradigms with the thought control depicted by George Orwell in Nineteen Eighty-Four. Debbie Morgan of the United Church Observer called it a "warning against the way religious doctrine can be created and used to enslave rather than to free." Carl Rapkins of the New York Tribune described it as "excellent and sophisticated—a rare treat." The book sold out its first edition of 5000 copies within weeks of its release. Shunned by her many Jehovah's Witness relatives, Botting focused her attention on developing a spiritual religion based on the paganism that her relatives so abhorred.

== University of Victoria ==
Botting received a second Master of Arts Degree in Religious Studies with a thesis on near death experiences from the University of Calgary before moving with her lawyer husband, Gary Botting, to Victoria, where she joined the faculty of University of Victoria as an anthropology professor, teaching folklore, anthropology of religion and social justice. Shortly after joining the faculty of University of Victoria, she was appointed as chaplain—the first recognized Wiccan university chaplain in North America.

== Coven Celeste ==
In the summer of 1966, Heather Harden met her fiance's maternal grandmother, Lysbeth Turner (née Rendle), the younger sister of Thomas Edward Rendle VC the first infantryman to receive the Victoria Cross in the First World War. After answering the "call to arms" of Gerald Gardner in 1940—when witches from across the south of England met in the New Forest for the purpose of casting a protective charm over England and a spell on Hitler's nefarious designs—Lysbeth Turner had become Gardner's London-based High Priestess. She had introduced Gary Botting to Gardner in 1953. Realizing that most of her Canadian family had become committed Jehovah's Witnesses, in 1966 Lysbeth expressed concern to Heather that her tradition of the "Old Religion" (i.e. Wicca) would be lost forever. Heather had empathy for this situation, since she had grown up in Ontario in the 1950s, when it was not fashionable to admit one's First Nations heritage (in her case, Assiniboine-Sioux). Despite her being a Jehovah's Witness, Heather rose to the challenge, abandoned the faith of her youth and was initiated into Witchcraft. Once they were married later that year, Gary and Heather Botting established Coven Celeste in Peterborough, Ontario - the first Wiccan coven in Canada. However, because of the severe social strictures placed upon them by Jehovah's Witnesses, including fear of being disfellowshipped, they stayed in the "broom closet" for years—the "gestation period" of Coven Celeste—discussing their new faith only with fellow pagans.

The coven came to full development in Sylvan Lake, Alberta, from where it "hived," with different members of the coven moving away, taking its traditions with them. Over the next 40 years it went through several permutations, spreading from Ontario east to Newfoundland and west to British Columbia, north to the Northwest Territories, and south as far as Corpus Christi, Texas. In keeping with the matrilineal tradition explained to Heather by Lysbeth Turner, Coven Celeste has been passed on to Heather's granddaughters, Phaydra and Ariadne.

== Aquarian Tabernacle Church ==
Michele Favarger attended Coven Celeste rituals in Alberta in 1982 and subsequently formed the Canadian Aquarian Tabernacle Church ("ATC") on Vancouver Island, inviting Heather Botting (as "Lady Aurora") and Gary Botting (as "Lord Pan") to become founding elders. The Bottings and Favarger, along with Favarger's partner and high priest Erik Lindblad, successfully campaigned the Province of British Columbia to recognize Wiccan weddings. By 1995 Coven Celeste had become one of the mainstay covens of Temple of the Lady in Victoria, BC, and the ATC was conducting a prison ministry and most pagan weddings in the province—mostly led by Arch-Priestess Michele Favarger and High Priestess Lady Aurora. Heather Botting then became High Priestess of Circle of the Wolfsong, the Victoria branch of the ATC, and her husband, Denis O'Brien, became the coven's high priest.

== Private life ==
Heather and Gary Botting have four children, Tanya (born 1970), Trent (born 1975), Thomas (born 1979) and Tharian (born 1983). They were divorced in 1999. In 2000, Heather married social worker Denis O'Brien, a Wiccan.
