= Kenny Klein =

American musician and writer (1955–2020)

- Klein, c. 2011

Background information
- Born: 1955; New York City, U.S.
- Died: June 11, 2020 (aged 64–65) Washington Parish, Louisiana, U.S.
- Genres: British folk; country
- Occupations: Musician; writer
- Instrument: Fiddle
- Years active: 1980s–2010s
- Labels: Kicking Mule; Blackthorn; Brewers' Witch
- Spouse: Tzipora Katz (m. 1983; div. 1992)

Kenny Klein (1955 – July 11, 2020) was an American folk and country musician and a writer. He was an elder and high priest in the Blue Star tradition of Wicca. Klein was a fiddler, playing styles ranging from British folk to jazz and swing. He was convicted in April 2017 of 20 counts of possession of child pornography. He died while serving his sentence in prison.

== Musical career ==
Born in New York City, Klein and his then-wife, Tzipora Katz, performed as a duo called Kenny and Tzipora in the mid-1980s, and they recorded several projects on Kicking Mule Records, including the album Wineskins, Tinkers, & Tears in 1985. Together with their children, they traveled around the U.S., performing at pagan festivals, renaissance fairs, and folk music venues. In 1992, Klein and Tzipora divorced, and he began his solo music career, subsequently releasing several projects on Blackthorn Records. In 1998, he released the CD Muses, an album of all original music produced by Brewers' Witch Productions.

== Neopagan activities ==
Through his interest in British folk music, Klein discovered the Wiccan and neopagan communities. While living in New York City, he joined Tzipora Katz's Blue Star coven and tradition of Wicca; he married Katz, who initiated him as a high priest in that tradition, in 1983. From 1983 to 1992, Katz and Klein were largely responsible for transforming Blue Star from a local coven to a Wiccan tradition of its own. Touring the country during that period, performing music, Klein and Tzipora continued to teach Blue Star Wicca, initiating people and founding covens, as well as teaching via recording and distributing lessons on cassette tapes.

In 1993, Klein authored The Flowering Rod: Men, Sex and Spirituality, a book on Wicca and men's mysteries.

== Child pornography conviction ==
On March 25, 2014, agents of the Louisiana State Police Special Victims Unit executed a search warrant at Klein's residence and seized a computer that contained 20 videos showing minor children engaged in sexually explicit activities. Upon his arrest, he claimed, without evidence, that he had downloaded the videos as "research" for an article he was writing for The Huffington Post.

On April 6, 2017, after a three-day jury trial, Klein was convicted of one count of pornography involving a juvenile under age 13, and 19 counts of possession with intent to distribute pornography involving juveniles under age 17. He was sentenced to 20 years in prison, fined $2,500, and ordered that, upon release, he wear an electronic ankle monitor for the rest of his life.

During the course of his trial, Klein's stepdaughter testified that he sexually abused her and her half-brother, Klein's biological son, for years, and that he physically abused her mother during their marriage. The court testimony is public record.

== Death ==
On July 13, 2020, it was reported on the Wild Hunt and in various places on social media that on July 11, 2020, Klein died in prison of pancreatic cancer, in the B.B. "Sixty" Rayburn Correctional Facility in Washington Parish, near Angie, Louisiana.

== Written works ==
- Fairy Tale Rituals (May 2011), Llewellyn Worldwide, ISBN 978-0-7387-2305-1
- Through The Faerie Glass (February 2010), Llewellyn Worldwide, ISBN 978-0-7387-1883-5
- The Flowering Rod: Men, Sex and Spirituality (March 1993), Delphi Press, ISBN 1-878980-07-6, ISBN 978-1-878980-07-6
- Lilith, Queen of the Desert (July 2010), includes the poem "Lilith" by Kenny Klein, Knickerbocker Circus Publishing, ISBN 978-1-4507-2236-0
- Girls I Knew When I Was Twenty (August 2004), Poetic Diversity.
- Legba in the French Market

== Discography ==
=== Solo ===
- 1994: Gold of the Autumn (Blackthorn)
- 1995: High Grows the Barley (Blackthorn)
- 1998: Muses (Brewers' Witch Productions)
- 2004: The Fairy Queen (Blackthorn)
- 2005: Little Birds Of Desire (Blackthorn)
- 2005: Barley Moon (Blackthorn)
- 2007: Meet Me in the Shade of the Maple Tree (Blackthorn)
- 2008: Oak & Ash (Blackthorn)
- 2011: Ghosts of the Delta (independent)
- 2012: Black Cat Blues (independent)

=== With Tzipora Katz ===
- 1983: Worn Out Threads and Tire Treads (Kicking Mule) – live album
- 1983: Moon Hooves in the Sand (Blue Star) – cassette
- 1984: Songs of the Otherworld (Kenny & Tzipora) – cassette
- 1985: Wineskins, Tinkers, & Tears (Kicking Mule) – LP
- 1986: Dreamer's Web (Kenny & Tzipora) – cassette
- 1988: Fairy Queen (Kenny & Tzipora) – cassette
- 1989: Both Sides of the Water (Kenny & Tzipora) – cassette
- 1990: Branches (Kenny & Tzipora) – Magical Audio Graphics Incomplete; cassette
- 1990: Kenny & Tzipora: Live & Kickin' at A.C.E. (A.C.E.) – cassette
- 1990: Gypsy, Enchantress (White Light Pentacles) – as guest artists; cassette; CD release in 2001
- 2004: Best of Pagan Song (Serpentine Music Productions) – compilation CD
