= Steph's Packed Lunch =

Daytime television programme on Channel 4 in the UK

- Genre: Entertainment; Lifestyle
- Presented by: Steph McGovern
- Country of origin: United Kingdom
- Original language: English

Production
- Executive producers: Rebecca Papworth; Ben Wicks; Peter Fincha
- Production location: Leeds, United Kingdom
- Editor: Vivek Sharma
- Camera setup: Multi-camera
- Running time: 130 minutes (inc. adverts)
- Production companies: Expectation North; Can Can Productions

Original release
- Network: Channel 4
- Release: 30 March 2020 – 8 December 2023

Steph's Packed Lunch (formerly aired as The Steph Show) was a British daytime television programme that was broadcast on Channel 4 each weekday afternoon from 30 March 2020 until 8 December 2023. The show was presented by English journalist and broadcaster Steph McGovern. The show was a live broadcast and featured items including showbiz interviews, food, news, and consumer advice. It was broadcast from Leeds Dock.

== Format ==
The show featured a live audience with regular guests such as Anton Du Beke, Denise van Outen, and Greg Wise. In addition, the show typically featured celebrity guests with cooking and lifestyle segments and the "One O'Clock Views" which covered the day's headlines.

The show originally started broadcasting at 12:30 p.m. which made it a rival to ITV's Loose Women.

== History ==
=== As The Steph Show ===
In late 2019, Channel 4 announced that a new live daytime programme presented by McGovern called The Steph Show had been commissioned, with a specially built studio overlooking Leeds Docks.

The Steph Show started broadcasting on 30 March 2020 after being brought forward, just one week after lockdown was announced. After leaving BBC Breakfast, several senior BBC staff worked on her new programme.

==== COVID-19 pandemic ====
As a result of the coronavirus lockdown, The Steph Show started broadcasting from McGovern's house. However, this caused logistical problems and it was announced that the show would be taken off air for a while. It was later announced in Summer 2020 that The Steph Show had been rebranded as Steph's Packed Lunch.

=== As Steph's Packed Lunch ===
The renamed show started on 14 September 2020. In February 2021, McGovern announced on Twitter that the show had been commissioned for another series. In July 2021, comedian Joe Lycett stormed off the set of the show as a stunt for raising awareness of white plastics and recycling for his consumer show Joe Lycett's Got Your Back. On 10 September 2021, former Spice Girl Mel B served as guest presenter as part of Channel 4's "Black to Front Day". Inbaal was a guest contributor on the programme from 2020 to 2023.

In October 2023, Channel 4 confirmed that the programme would end after three years on the air. The broadcaster cited low viewer numbers as part of the reason. The final Steph's Packed Lunch was broadcast on 8 December 2023.
