= Pete Davis (pagan) =

Neopaganist religious figure

Pierre Claveloux Davis, also known as Pete Pathfinder (1937 – 2014), was a religious figure in modern Paganism. He founded the Aquarian Tabernacle Church (ATC) in 1985, in Index, Washington, and served as its archpriest. He was also involved with several publications and related organizations. Davis advocated for Wicca and Paganism as an expert witness, and was part of a group of people who successfully petitioned for the pentacle to be available as a symbol used on U.S. veteran's headstones.

== Early life ==
Davis was born in Jersey City, New Jersey, in 1937 to a Catholic father and mother. On August 14, 1974, at the age of 37, he entered the Pagan world as a Wiccan initiate in the Dorpat tradition. In 1976, he relocated to Index, Washington. In 1983, he was initiated into the New Wiccan Church (Kingstone) tradition in Seattle, Washington.

== Aquarian Tabernacle Church ==
Once established in Washington, Davis began work on creating an oasis for local Pagans on his property. On Samhain 1979, he established the Aquarian Tabernacle Church (ATC), a Wiccan religious tradition.

By 1985, the ATC had an established liturgy and a circle of standing stones called Moonstone Circlea. in 1988, the church received IRS 501(c)(3) exemption status, which was elevated to an umbrella status in 1991.

As archpriest of the ATC, Davis founded Panagyria magazine, Woolsten Steen Theological Seminary, Spring Mysteries Festival, Hecate's Sickle Festival, and Spiral Scouts International.

== Religious advocacy ==
In 1985, Davis was retained by the Washington State Attorney General as an expert witness in Wicca for a civil rights case brought by a Wiccan prisoner in federal court.

In 1995, Davis became the first Wiccan elected president of the Interfaith Council of Washington. He served two terms.

The advocacy work Davis is most known for is his involvement with the so-called "Veteran's Pentacle Quest." He, along with members of other Pagan organizations, petitioned the Veterans Administration for 10 years to add the pentacle as an option for veterans' headstones.

== Death ==
Davis died on October 31, 2014.

== See also ==
- List of Neopagan movements
