= Wiccan organisation =

Groups formed by Wiccans

Wiccan organisations are groups formed by Wiccans, particularly in North America. While in Europe Wicca is most often organised into independent covens, in the United States some covens choose to combine to form a Wiccan church or other organisation. Churches are often formed from hive covens.

== Legal status ==
Some Wiccan and neopagan witchcraft organisations have chosen to achieve formal legal status by becoming non-profit corporations within their states or provinces, and sometimes they additionally obtain tax-exempt status in the United States under § 501(c)(3) of the Internal Revenue Code.

== List of organizations ==
- Aquarian Tabernacle Church
- Bricket Wood coven
- Children of Artemis
- Church and School of Wicca
- Circle Sanctuary
- Coven Celeste
- Covenant of the Goddess
- New Forest coven
- New Reformed Orthodox Order of the Golden Dawn
- Panthean Temple
- The Rowan Tree Church
- Universal Eclectic Wicca
- Wiccan Church of Canada
- Witchcraft Research Association

== See also ==
- Grey School of Wizardry
- Magical organization
- Our Lady of Endor Coven
