= Covenstead =

Meeting place of a coven

A covenstead is a meeting place of a coven (a group of witches). The term relates specifically to the meeting place of witches within certain modern religious movements such as Wicca that fall under the collective term Modern Paganism, also referred to as Contemporary Paganism or Neopaganism. It functions to provide a place for the group to conduct rituals, undertake lessons and recognise festivals. It can also be referred to as the home of the coven.

A group's covenstead is often a physical geographical location, however it can also be a concept such as an astral temple. A covenstead is commonly located in the house of the priest or priestess or a member of the coven, but it can also be a public area such as a park or a room in a community building. An appropriate location is selected depending on a number of factors including the size of the coven. The types of covensteads recognised by practitioners have developed over time as technology and the various denominations of Neopaganism have evolved.

== Etymology ==
The word ‘coven’ is derived from Old French and in the 1500s meant a “meeting, gathering, assembly”. Around 1660 it also came to mean “a gathering of witches”. The word ‘stead’ comes from the Old English term stede, meaning “place, position”.

== Origin and history ==
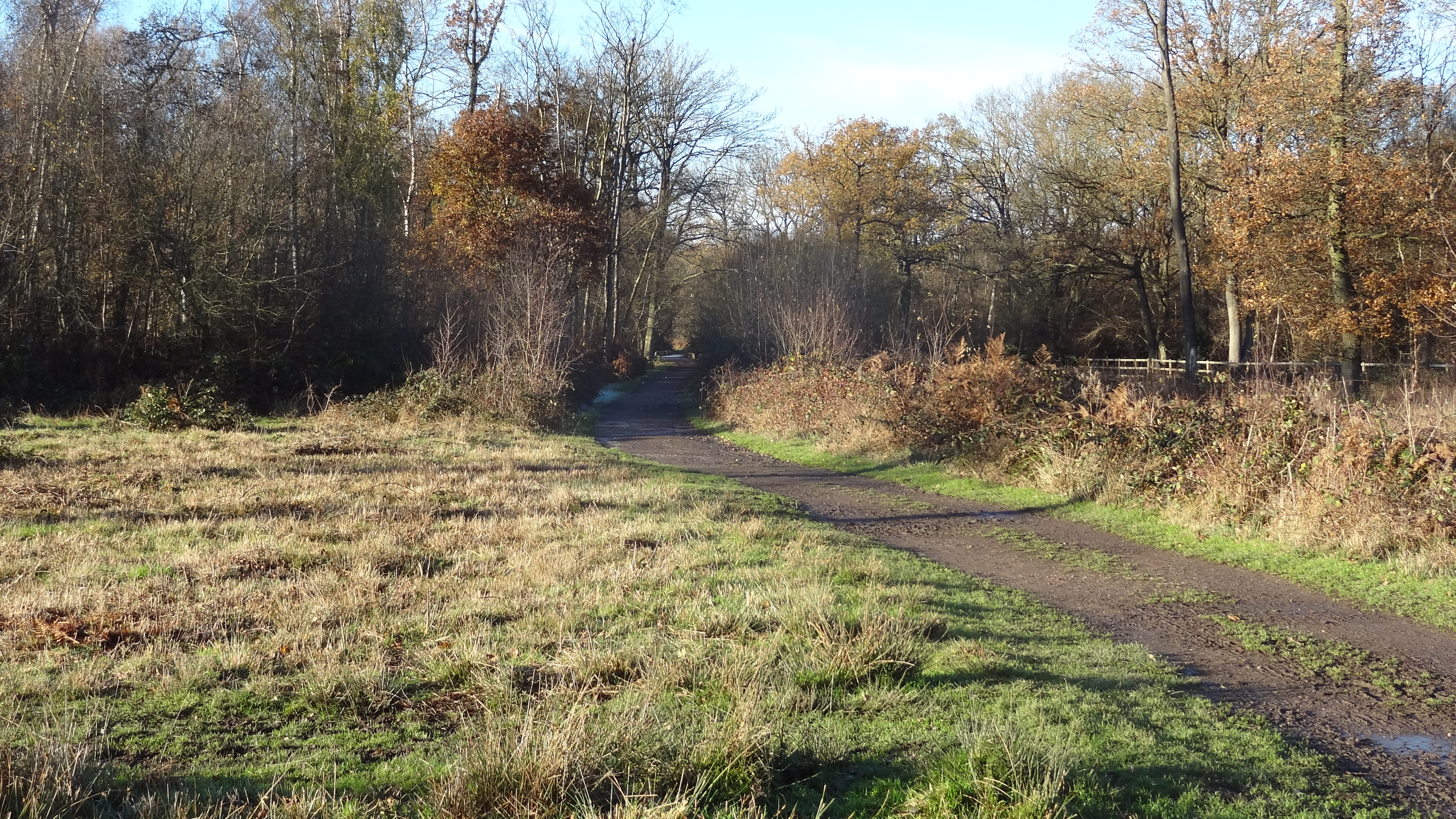
Brickett Wood, Hertfordshire, England

Modern pagan witchcraft practices and rituals are largely associated with Gerald Brosseau Gardner (1884–1964) who is attributed with reviving the ancient pagan religion Wicca in the 1950s. Wicca and other religions considered to be derived from pre-Christian traditions are closely associated with nature, spirituality and witchcraft. Various denominations of the Modern Pagan religion also celebrate a number holidays and festivals throughout the year.

Gardner founded his own coven in the 1940s and established their covenstead on his land at Brickett Wood in Hertfordshire, north of London. He was responsible for re-writing certain rituals that were practiced by his previous coven using borrowed concepts from magician Aleister Crowley, Charles Godfrey Leland's Aradia, or the Gospel of the Witches and the medieval spell book Key of Solomon.

Gardner's Brickett Wood covenstead acted as a place in which his coven could carry out these rituals, celebrate the various festivals and hold general meetings.

== Functions ==
There are multiple functions of a covenstead. It is recognised by the group as an established and familiar location and allows members to focus on the proceedings of their meetings. A predominant function is to allow a safe space for sabbats (seasonal festivals recognised by modern Pagans) and esbats (a meeting other than a festival) to take place. It can also be a place to worship the gods and goddesses, to conduct the various rituals and to hold witchcraft classes. It is also often used as a location for communal celebration and various social gatherings. An example of a ritual that can take place in a covenstead is an esbat rite. This rite involves the process of the priest or priestess initiating the proceedings, members of the circle giving their thanks, making requests to their gods and goddesses followed by the ringing of a bell. The ritual can also involve music, song and chanting.

== Types of covensteads ==
Depending on the location and residence of coven members and the size of their group, a covenstead can be established in a number of spaces both indoor and outdoor. As a predominant function of a covenstead is to provide a safe space to conduct rituals it is typically found somewhere coven members can remain uninterrupted and able to concentrate. This space can be either permanent or temporary. A room in the house of a priest or priestess is a common location. Other possible spaces include rooms of other coven members’ homes, public parks or rented spaces in community buildings. Another alternative option some covens resort to is an astral temple - a shared non-physical place for coven members to access if they are unable to attend the physical covenstead.

The surrounding community can also be a contributing factor when deciding where to establish a covenstead as there is often suspicion and prejudice surrounding the term ‘witch’. Gerald Brosseau Gardner registered his Brickett Wood covenstead under the name of the Ancient British Church - into which he was ordained - as a response to this prejudice and with the aim of making it appear more reputable. A successful example of a coven's integration into a community is the establishment of the House of Oak Spring's covenstead in Decatur, Georgia in 2000. The group purchased a secluded home with surrounding acreage with the intention of remodelling the property to act as their common meeting place and to serve their various needs. The group also began developing walking paths through the surrounding land to be accessed and utilised by the coven's members as well as residents of their suburban community, which was well received.

== Online covensteads ==
Various denominations of Neopaganism have adapted alongside technological developments and have found new tools and methods of communication to reach their followers and members, including online congregations and rituals. The members of these online communities were dubbed “Technopagans” in a 1995 Wired article. Technopagans don't often meet in person but form close relationships with one another, similar to those within covens that meet in person regularly.

There are examples of online pagan meetings carried out on CompuServe conference rooms in which members participated remotely in rituals such as celebrations of the full moon. Although there was no face to face contact between members of the covens, rituals were still carried out and festivals were celebrated. In this online space where music and chanting aloud cannot be practiced as a group, physical objects and key phrases are simply typed.

The online virtual world platform Second Life is also host to neopagan meetings and ceremonies. The affordances of the site allow for 'cybercovens' to meet virtually using avatars to participate in social events and rituals. On Second Life, users can visit a pub or a digital marketplace, meditate, access digital copies of neopagan texts, and gather at an altar to carry out rituals and sabbats. The experience can be likened to covensteads situated in the astral plane, functioning similarly to astral temples. The avatars created on Second Life can resemble the user's own physical appearance, but can also allow the user to construct an alternative self that enhances their online spiritual experience with features such as wings. 'Covenstead' is one of Second Life's oldest and largest Pagan communities. It sponsors a Sim, or virtual island, where one can attend various Pagan and Wiccan online events.

More recent examples of online rituals and gatherings of modern Pagans include YouTube channels. Through videos, individual practitioners are brought together to collectively partake in these rituals, share knowledge with each other, and celebrate the various festivals.

Although online gatherings can allow people from across the globe to connect and participate in religious rituals, there are certain elements of computer-mediated communication that hinder the smooth procession of the experience, such as the loading time of graphics and animations, as well as lag with large groups of people. Alterations to ritual techniques are often necessary in order for them to be successfully carried out in an online format; participants usually emphasize a focus on imagination during the virtual proceedings.

Due to the increasing prevalence of online neopagan gatherings, devices used to participate, such as laptops, are often considered ritual objects that belong on the altar alongside other ritual objects, such as candles.

=== On social media ===
With a number of prominent social media personalities gaining significant followings from sharing their neopagan beliefs and practices on their channels, there are reports such as a 2018 iNews UK article that suggests these followings aren't covens but are instead communities. This also suggests that these online communities, although come together to meet, are not meeting in a covenstead, but something else entirely.

== Covensteads in folklore and popular culture ==
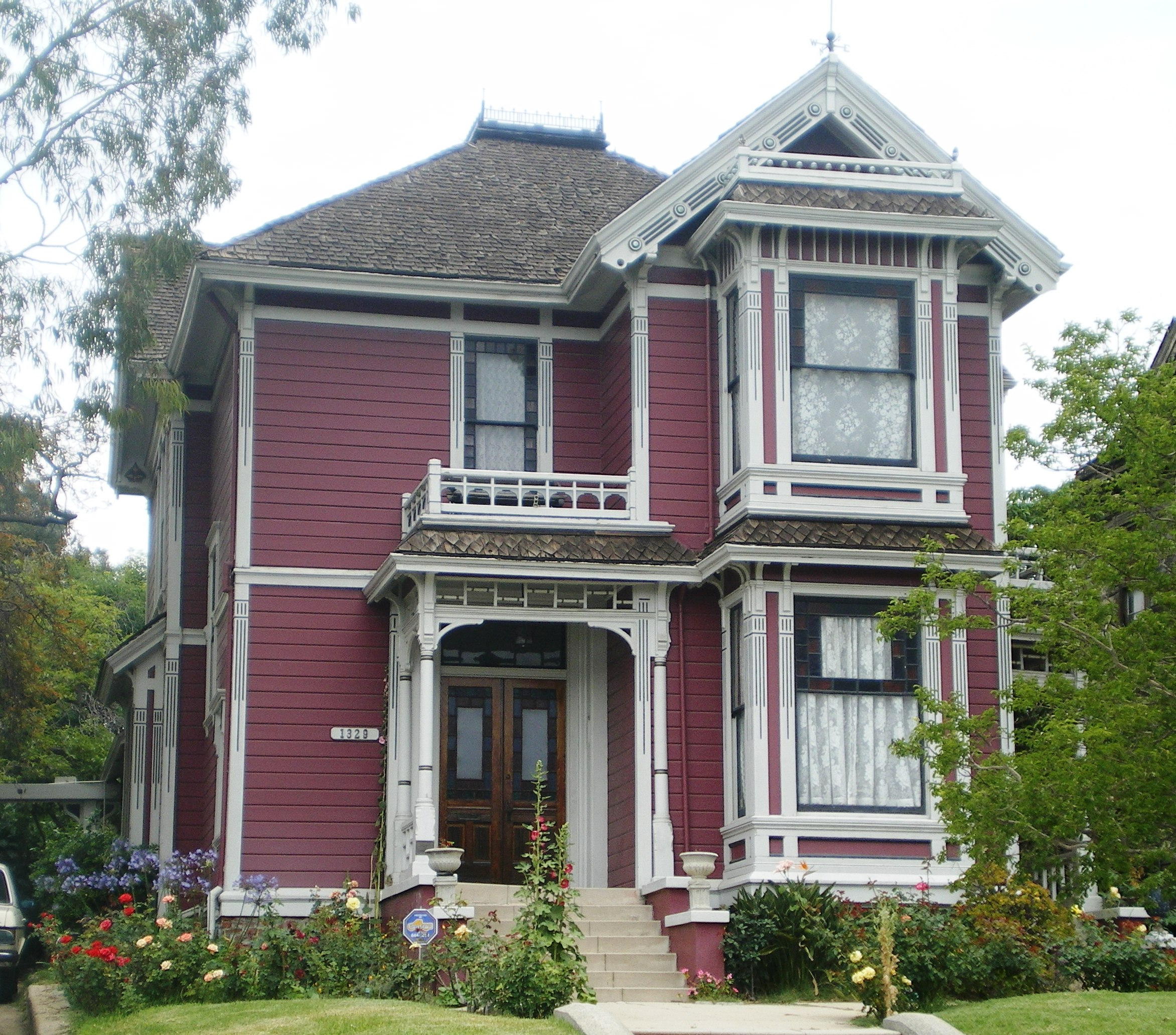
'Charmed' House, Los Angeles, USA

Pagan sites and places witches gather to carry out rituals and to worship gods and goddesses have existed in folklore and popular culture for centuries. Chanctonbury Ring, located in South Downs, England with remains as old as 300BC, is believed to be an early pagan site and continues to have pagan ties with reports of groups still visiting the land to participate in occult activities.

There are various interpretations of Paganism and Neopaganism in modern popular culture with TV shows, films and novels including American Horror Story: Coven, the Harry Potter series, Charmed, Witches of Eastwick and The Craft all being examples of entertainment depicting modern representations of ancient practices and beliefs. As each show, film or novel represent varying interpretations of these revived and renewed ancient religious practices, representations of covensteads also vary and often there is no identifiable covenstead at all.

The 1998 American TV series Charmed, starring Hollie Marie Combs, Alyssa Milano and Rose McGowan, was a highly rated show that depicted three witch sisters living together in a single house they called the Halliwell Manor. This house was often the place in which they carried out spells and rituals with the Book of Shadows. However, in the Harry Potter books and films, the education of magic primarily occurs in an institute dedicated to the purpose, The Hogwarts School of Witchcraft and Wizardry, instead of a more private and secluded room or home that is traditionally identified as a covenstead.
