= Odyssean Wicca =

Wiccan tradition in Canada, United States

- Abbreviation: OW
- Type: Wicca
- Governance: Advance Priesthood
- Associations: Blue Star Wicca, small portion of Alexandrian Wicca
- Region: Canada, United States
- Founder: Tamarra and Richard James
- Origin: late 1970s Toronto, Ontario, Canada

Odyssean Wicca is a Wiccan tradition created in Toronto, Ontario, Canada, in the late 1970s. Its principal founders were Tamarra and Richard James. Most of its practitioners today live in Ontario, but it also has members in Eastern Canada and the United States. The tradition differs from other initiatory Wiccan traditions in its emphasis on preparation of its members for public priesthood.

The Odyssean tradition is strongly connected with the Wiccan Church of Canada, a public Wiccan church also founded by the Jameses.

== Origins and history ==
The Odyssean Tradition of Wicca was founded by Richard and Tamara James in 1979, along with other members of their coven. The name of the tradition was inspired by Homer's Odyssey, and is meant to emphasize a belief in life as a "spiritual journey".

The tradition grew out of the James' creation of the Wiccan Church of Canada, with which the tradition is still very closely associated. While the James’s and their coven members claimed to have had backgrounds in Gardnerian Wicca, Alexandrian Wicca, and Continental Wicca, these claims were never substantiated—the general consensus of the British Traditional Wiccan community in Ontario prior to 1987 was that these claims had no substance whatsoever. Regardless, those traditions were not ideally suited for the goal of creating a place for public Neopagan worship, nor did any of these reflect the ritual style that the coven (and, by extension, the church) were adopting—with the exception of Pagan Way (an Outer Court system created by Gardnerian initiates) that had a direct influence upon Wiccan Church of Canada liturgy. The Odyssean tradition is a British Traditional-like Eclectic tradition of Wicca—with a public Wiccan priesthood providing religious services for a Neopagan laity^{[3]}^{[4]}. In 1987, the James' purchased much of Gerald Gardner's collection back from Ripleys, this included Ye Bok of Ye Art Magical. It is after this purchase that the James' received valid initiations and elevations into the various traditions and lineages British Traditional Wicca ^{[4]}.

The Odyssean tradition and the Wiccan Church of Canada reached their apex in 1992—at that time there were four temples (Toronto, Ottawa, Hamilton, and Kitchener-Waterloo) and three proto-temples in Brampton, Oshawa, and Montreal. Currently, the Wiccan Church of Canada has only two temples; the mother temple in Toronto, Ontario and a temple in Hamilton, Ontario ^{[4]}. While the influence of the Wiccan Church of Canada has declined over the past decade, the indirect influence of the Odyssean tradition has grown. Because the WCC is a public Modern Pagan church, and because many members of the laity, many neophytes, and many initiates step away from the WCC to follow their path elsewhere. There are more former members of the WCC laity and more retired neophytes and initiates of the Odyssean tradition than there are active initiates. Many of these retired Odysseans have gone on to found their own covens and traditions that are based upon Odyssean practices. Many of the other Wiccan churches that exist in Canada, and to some extent the United States, have drawn upon Odyssean sources and retired Odysseans.

Prior to 1987, an Odyssean initiate who had been elevated into the High Priesthood would be autonomous of both the tradition's founders and of the WCC. That meant that they could initiate and/or elevate their students up to the highest degree (3rd Degree) without requiring approval from the other High Priesthood of the tradition. For those initiated after 1987, these initiates would have to retain active status—they must perform a minimal level of religious services (public rituals and public classes) to one of the temples of the Wiccan Church of Canada—for them to even bring a student before the Odyssean Priesthood Council. The Odyssean Priesthood Council is open to all initiates who currently have active status and it is only after obtaining the approval of the Council that an initiate may initiate or elevate their student. If an initiate fails to perform the minimum amount of religious services to one of the Wiccan Church of Canada temples, their status will be downgraded to inactive. An Odyssean initiate who has been inactive for more than one year and one day can be reclassified by the High Priesthood of the tradition as retired. A retired Odyssean initiate can only return to active status with the permission of the High Priesthood of the tradition. Therefore, while the Odyssean tradition and the WCC were separate during the foundation years of the church, it has been the practice for the past twenty years that the Odyssean tradition and the Wiccan Church of Canada are firmly linked one to the other^{[4]}.

== Practices ==
Beyond the emphasis on public ministry, the Odyssean tradition is characterized by the following: it is an Eclectic tradition in its origins that has a strong British Traditional Wicca style to its forms of organization and initiation; although it emulates British Traditional the tradition's approach to ritual is more flexible and may often be less structured than many British Traditional Wiccans would be comfortable with; the tradition rejects the concepts of Neopagan monism and Neopagan monotheism; the tradition does accept the base-line Wiccan concept of Neopagan duotheism but does encourage students and seekers alike to choose to affiliate with a particular Pagan pantheon and encourages the devotion to a deity (or group of deities) ^{[3]}^{[4]}.

The Odyssean training system is remarked upon as being notably rigorous^{[3]}^{[4]}, which can be observed in the Wiccan Church of Canada weekly classes. These classes comprise the basic body of knowledge considered necessary by Odysseans, and can span upwards of 150 hours of class time or more. Completion of these classes (which includes the student completing the homework exercises assigned) is often considered a minimum requirement by Initiates before they accept a person as a new student.

== Ranks and degrees ==
- Dedication is a ceremony performed by Odysseans for those individuals who wish to confirm themselves to a Neopagan (not necessarily Odyssean) path, and to worship of the Old Gods.
- Neophyting is a "pre-degree" marking the candidate's commitment to a study of the tradition. Although not an Initiate of the tradition, a Neophyte student is oathbound. It is typically awarded after one to two years of study with a private teacher, which in turn takes place after completion of a year-long cycle of public classes.
- First Degree Initiation is the rite of ordination within the Odyssean tradition. A first degree initiate is a priest or priestess and a member of the tradition. Among Odysseans, this is only awarded with the consent of a council composed of members of the tradition's active priesthood. It typically takes three to five years of study after Neophyting. It indicates competency in the demands of public priesthood, including "leading ritual, teaching, counselling [and] handling crises."^{[3]}.
- Second Degree Initiation represents an elevation to "High Priesthood". It is given to those who, in addition to work assigned, have been running a coven or student group successfully for at least a year and trained at least one student through to the first degree level. The time required for elevation to this degree is variable, and many first degree initiates do not actively pursue further training, but for those who do it generally takes five to ten years after initiation.
- Third Degree Initiation is rarely awarded, as it is only given to those people who have made a major contribution to the Neopagan community^{[3]}.

== Relationship with other traditions ==
As mentioned above, Odyssean Wicca was inspired at least in part by the Gardnerian, Alexandrian, Continental, and Blue Star traditions.

Despite the first part of its name, like all forms of Wicca, Odyssean Wicca has no connection to the modern religion of Hellenismos, which is based on the worship of the Greek Gods of antiquity.

Blue Star Wicca does have a special relationship to the Odyssean tradition, as a "sister" or "cousin" tradition. The Dymond line of Alexandrian Wicca also has a unique relationship with the Odyssean tradition and the Wiccan Church of Canada. Because the Odyssean tradition has been created from the known published material (circa 1979) of Gardnerian Wicca and Alexandrian Wicca a greater exposure to the ritual style of other Wiccan and Modern Pagan traditions is offered to Odyssean laity, neophytes, and initiates through the Wiccan Church of Canada ^{[4]}.

== See also ==
- Neopagan witchcraft
- Wiccan organisation

== Notes and references ==
1. "Wicca 101 classes".
2. Farrar, Janet and Stewart; Bone, Gavin (1995). The Pagan Path. Phoenix Publishing. ISBN 0-919345-40-9.
3. ^{a} ^{b} ^{c} ^{d} ^{e} ^{f} Landstreet, Lynna. "A Brief History of the WCC and the Odyssean Tradition". Archived from the original on May 10, 2015.
4. ^{a} ^{b} ^{c} ^{d} ^{e} ^{f} ^{g} ^{h} Jamieson-Williams, Neil (2008). A Field Guide to Modern Pagans in Hamilton, Ontario. Australopithecine Press. ISBN 978-1-894602-11-2.
5. Gillette, Devyn Christopher. "Home Again: An Introduction To Blue Star Wicca". Archived from the original on November 27, 2005.
