= 4thought.tv =

- Title card
- Genre: Documentary
- Country of origin: United Kingdom
- Original language: English

Production
- Camera setup: Single-camera setup
- Running time: 2 minutes
- Production company: Waddell Media

Original release
- Network: Channel 4
- Release: 5 July 2010 – 27 December 2013

4thought.tv was a British documentary television programme, which aired weekdays at 7:55 pm on Channel 4 from 5 July 2010 to 27 December 2013.

== Premise ==
The series consisted of personal short films, in which a single speaker reflects on religious and ethical issues, and aspects of spiritual lives. The shorts challenge traditional views, and provided a platform for both scepticism and devout religious beliefs.
