= Universal Eclectic Wicca =

American Wiccan organization

Church of Universal Eclectic Wicca
- A floral Pentagram is a commonly used symbol in Universal Eclectic Wicca.
- Abbreviation: CUEW
- Formation: 1969, Westchester County, New York
- Founder: Jayne Tomas
- Type: Eclectic Wicca tradition
- Headquarters: Great Falls, Virginia, US
- Region served: International
- Secessions: Progressive Eclectic Wicca (2004)
- Remarks: Has Lineaged and Non-lineaged Septs

Universal Eclectic Wicca (UEW) is one of a number of distinctly American Wiccan traditions which developed following the introduction of Gardnerian and Alexandrian Wicca to the United States in the early 1960s. Its corporate body is the Church of Universal Eclectic Wicca (CUEW) which is incorporated and based in Great Falls, Virginia.

It is particularly noted for its early Internet teaching coven – the Coven of the Far Flung Net (CFFN), and for its inclusive approach to solitary as well as coven based practitioners.

== History ==
=== Silver Chalice Wicca ===
What was to become UEW began, in 1969, as the core coven associated with the Silver Chalice Land Trust, an intentional community based in Westchester, New York.

Silver Chalice had a diverse membership drawing from both Dianic and British Traditional Wiccan backgrounds. It was partly as a response to this diversity, as well as a perceived need for reform in Wicca, that their High Priestess, Jayne Tomas, began to create a body of liturgy for Silver Chalice Wicca as a distinct tradition.

A defining text is the Ordains of Silver Chalice, which may be seen as an attempt to refer to, and move away from, the Old Laws of Gardnerian Wicca. Together with the Fifteen Creeds of Silver Chalice Wicca (1969) they emphasized modernism; democratic principles; historical, intellectual and personal integrity; race and gender equality; self-determination; and engagement with society.

=== Change of name ===
By 1986 the land held by the Silver Chalice Land Trust was sold, and all the covens that originated with Silver Chalice were referred to as Universal Eclectic Wicca.

'Universal' because "Wicca is universal because it can be used by all, and anything can be used in Wicca"; and 'Eclectic' because "UEW is based not on one or two sources, but an infinite number of sources".

=== On-line teaching covens ===
In 1997 UEW chartered the Coven of the Far Flung Net (CFFN), which began operating in January of the following year, and which it maintains was the first on-line teaching coven. UEW has two other on-line teaching groups, the Coven of Non-Fluffy Wicca (2006), which is aimed at more advanced students with some prior knowledge of Wicca, and Vircle, for Third Circle Studies.

=== Schisms ===
In 2004, following a reorganization of CFFN which abolished its then clan structure, one of the dissolved clans, Athames's Edge, re-established itself to form an independent Progressive Eclectic Wicca tradition.

Later, in 2008, the first Australian UEW coven, Oak and Mistletoe, split away to establish the Inclusive Wicca tradition.

== Core beliefs ==
UEW allows for diverse interpretations of Wiccan practice and belief, provided that a core set of ethical values are observed. These are commonly referred to as the Five Points of Wiccan Belief and the Affirmation of Acknowledgement.

=== Five Points ===
The Five Points of Wiccan belief are the Wiccan Rede, the Law of Return, the Ethic of Self-Responsibility, the Ethic of Constant Improvement and the Ethic of Attunement.

=== Affirmation of Acknowledgement ===
In addition to the 'Five Points', UEW requires its members to assent to the Affirmation of Acknowledgement, which is intended to inform behavior towards, and interaction with, those of other faiths. It states that:

I: I acknowledge the presence of other faiths on my planet, indeed, right here in my city/town/village. I acknowledge that the followers of these faiths feel as strongly, maybe more so, than I do about mine.

II: I forgive the other faiths and wipe clean the slate between us. I cannot hold a person responsible for the acts of their faith, I cannot hold a faith at fault for individual practitioners. It is not my place to convert, or otherwise alter a person's religion. I invite discussion of beliefs without judgment of those holding them.

III: I acknowledge that I may be wrong, and I have found comfort in the fact that I may be right.

== Organization ==
=== Types of membership ===
There are five types of membership recognized in UEW:

Pre-First Circle - those who have only basic knowledge of UEW or Wicca and who will be typically registered for an introductory course in UEW

- First Circle - in which a knowledge of The Five Points of Wiccan Belief must be demonstrated;
- Second Circle - in which a higher degree of knowledge and signing of the oath of practice are required;
- Third Circle - in which an independent project has determined a "higher level" of Devotion to a "Path" of UEW; and
- Clergy - ordained ministers.

=== Triad ===
The executive body of CUEW is the three-person Triad. The Triad is solely responsible for extending or withholding membership of CUEW to both individuals and groups. Each member of the Triad is responsible for the selection and training of their successor.

=== Council of Elders ===
The Triad is advised and assisted by a Council of Elders. Any Third Circle member may nominate themselves for membership of the Council of Elders. The Council of Elders annually elects one of their number as Chief Elder.

=== Association of Universal Eclectic Wicca Clergy ===
The Association of Universal Eclectic Wicca Clergy (AUEWC), is responsible for the ratification of Ordained Clergy. CUEW covens with eight or more.

== See also ==
- Neopagan witchcraft
- Wiccan organisation
