= Aquarian Tabernacle Church =

Wiccan church

- Aquarian Tabernacle Church logo
- Formation: 1979; 47 years ago
- Founder: Pete Davis
- Type: Wiccan church
- Legal status: 501c(3)
- Headquarters: Index, Washington
- Arch Priestess: Rev. Lady Belladonna Laveau
- Website: www.atcwicca.org

The Aquarian Tabernacle Church (ATC) is a Wiccan church located in Index, Washington. It is one of the first Wiccan organisations to receive full legal recognition as a church in the United States and Australia. The church has an umbrella 501c(3), there are 29 affiliate churches in North America, with 3 additional affiliates on other continents and 7 countries (as of January 2015). The ATC founded SpiralScouts International and Woolston-Steen Theological Seminary, a degree giving college recognized by the Washington State government that can give degrees from Associates to Doctorates in Wiccan Ministry. Through Woolston-Steen Seminary, the church offers prison chaplaincy programs.

== History ==
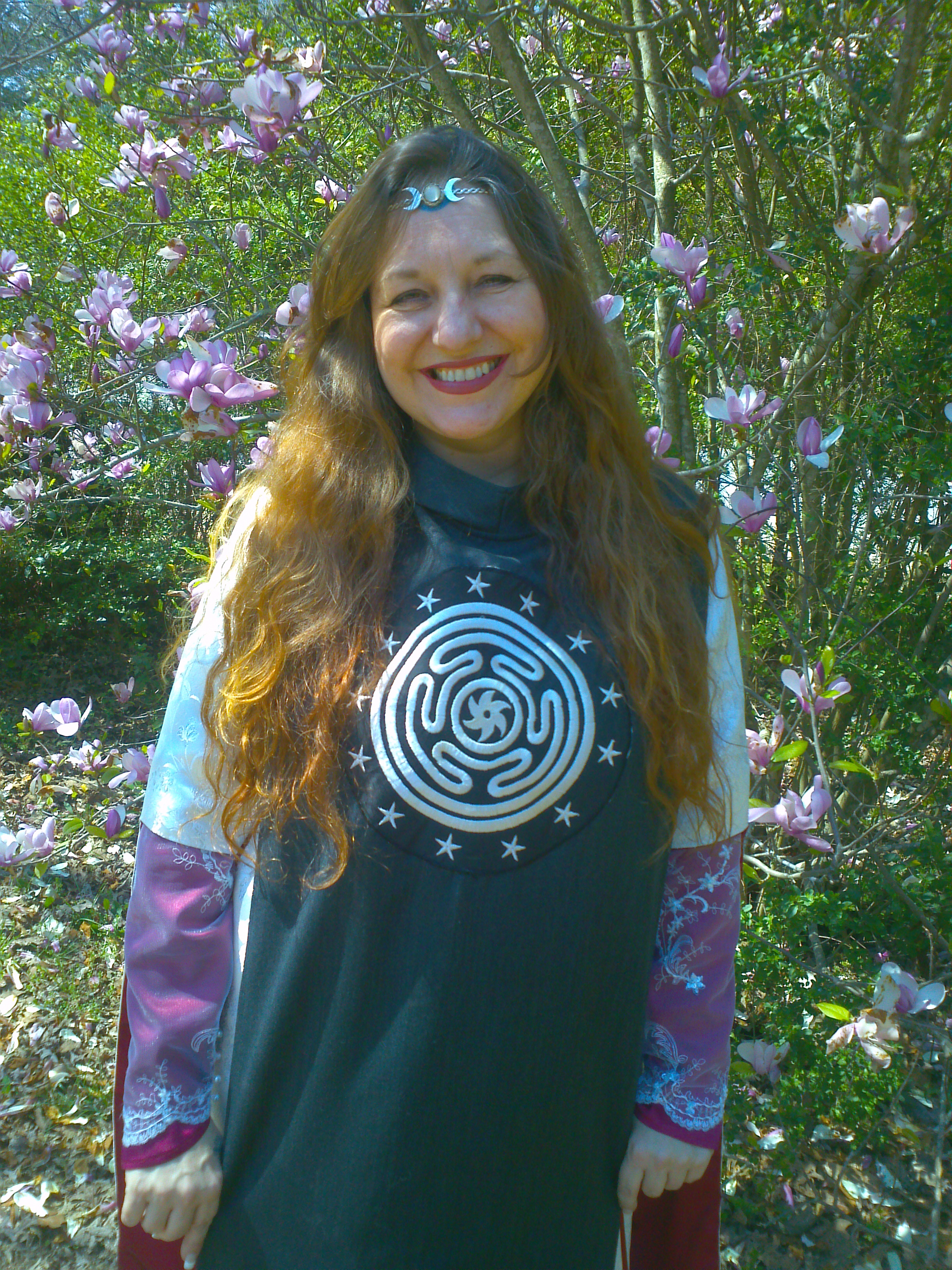
Belladonna Laveau

The Aquarian Tabernacle Church (ATC) was founded in 1979 by Pete Davis, who died at 6pm on 31 October 2014. The mother church is located in Index, WA. The current Arch Priestess is Rev. Lady Belladonna Laveau.

== Beliefs ==
The Aquarian Tabernacle Church professes a form of panentheism: every person is an expression of the ultimate deity which pervades everything. This deity is described as both masculine and feminine, but is conceptualized in a parental role, e.g. the Great Mother, a benevolent creator deity.

== Festivals ==
The ATC hosts two festivals every year.

The Spring Mysteries Festival allegedly celebrates the Eleusinian Mysteries. It provides a ritual experience allowing one to speak to the gods that Wild Hunt columnist Mary Shoup called "a life-changing experience." It occurs on the weekend of Easter every year. The first year was 1985.

Hecate's Sickle Festival celebrates the traditional Wiccan Samhain theme, and participate in workshops and classes that allow them to explore the grief and death aspects of the Wiccan belief structure, as well as undergo healing experiences that will help them move from the dark half to the light half of our year. It occurs in October every year. The first year was in 1989.

== See also ==
- List of Neopagan movements
- Neopagan witchcraft
- Wiccan organisation
