= Coven =

Group or gathering of witches

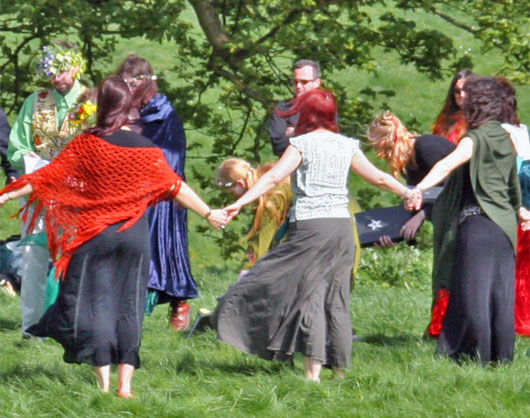
Gathering of Wiccans for a handfasting ceremony at Avebury in England

A coven (/kʌvən/) is a group or gathering of witches. The word "coven" (from Anglo-Norman covent, cuvent, from Old French covent, from Latin conventum = convention) remained largely unused in English until 1921 when Margaret Murray promoted the idea that all witches across Europe met in groups of thirteen which they called "covens".

== Modern paganism ==
In the Wicca religion and other similar forms of modern pagan witchcraft, such as Stregheria and Feri, a coven is a gathering or community of witches, like an affinity group, engagement group, or small covenant group. It is composed of a group of practitioners who gather together for rituals such as Drawing Down the Moon, or celebrating the Sabbats. The place at which they generally meet is called a covenstead.

The number of people involved may vary. Although some consider thirteen to be ideal (probably in deference to Murray's theories), any group of at least three can be a coven. A group of two is usually called a "working couple" (regardless of their gender). It can also unofficially be called an "Obaven" by some members of the community, derived from the Scottish Gaelic word "obair" meaning work, a tribute to the more official term "working couple", a portmanteau with the word "coven". Thus creating the word, "Obaven". Within the community, many believe that a coven larger than thirteen is unwieldy, citing unwieldy group dynamics and an unfair burden on the leadership. When a coven has grown too large to be manageable, it may split, or "hive". In Wicca, this may also occur when a newly made High Priest or High Priestess, also called 3rd Degree initiation, leaves to start their own coven.

Wiccan covens are usually jointly led by a High Priestess and a High Priest, although some are led by only one or the other, and some by a same-sex couple. In more recent forms of modern pagan witchcraft, covens are sometimes run as democracies with a rotating leadership.

=== Online covens ===
With the rise of the Internet as a platform for collaborative discussion and media dissemination, it became popular for adherents and practitioners of Wicca to establish "online covens" which remotely teach tradition-specific crafts to students in a similar method of education as non-religious virtual online schools. One of the first online covens to take this route is the Coven of the Far Flung Net (CFFN), which was established in 1997 as the online arm of the Church of Universal Eclectic Wicca.

=== Other contemporary forms ===
The Urban Coven is a group founded on Facebook by Becca Gordon for women in Los Angeles to gather, hike, and howl at the Moon. It meets monthly and is estimated to have almost 3,500 members. A January 2016 gathering at Griffith Park drew nearly 1,000 women, and was described as follows:

A lot of the women ... were there in groups — mothers and daughters, friends, colleagues. Some arrived solo and struck up conversations with other women or hiked in solitude.

== See also ==
- Magical organization
- Wiccan organisation

== Bibliography ==
- Margot Adler (2006) Drawing Down the Moon. Penguin Books.
- Miriam Simos (1999) The Spiral Dance. San Francisco: Harper.
- Janet and Stuart Farrar (1996) A Witches' Bible: The Complete Witches Handbook. Phoenix Publishing.
