= Merchant Peak =

Mountain in Washington (state), United States

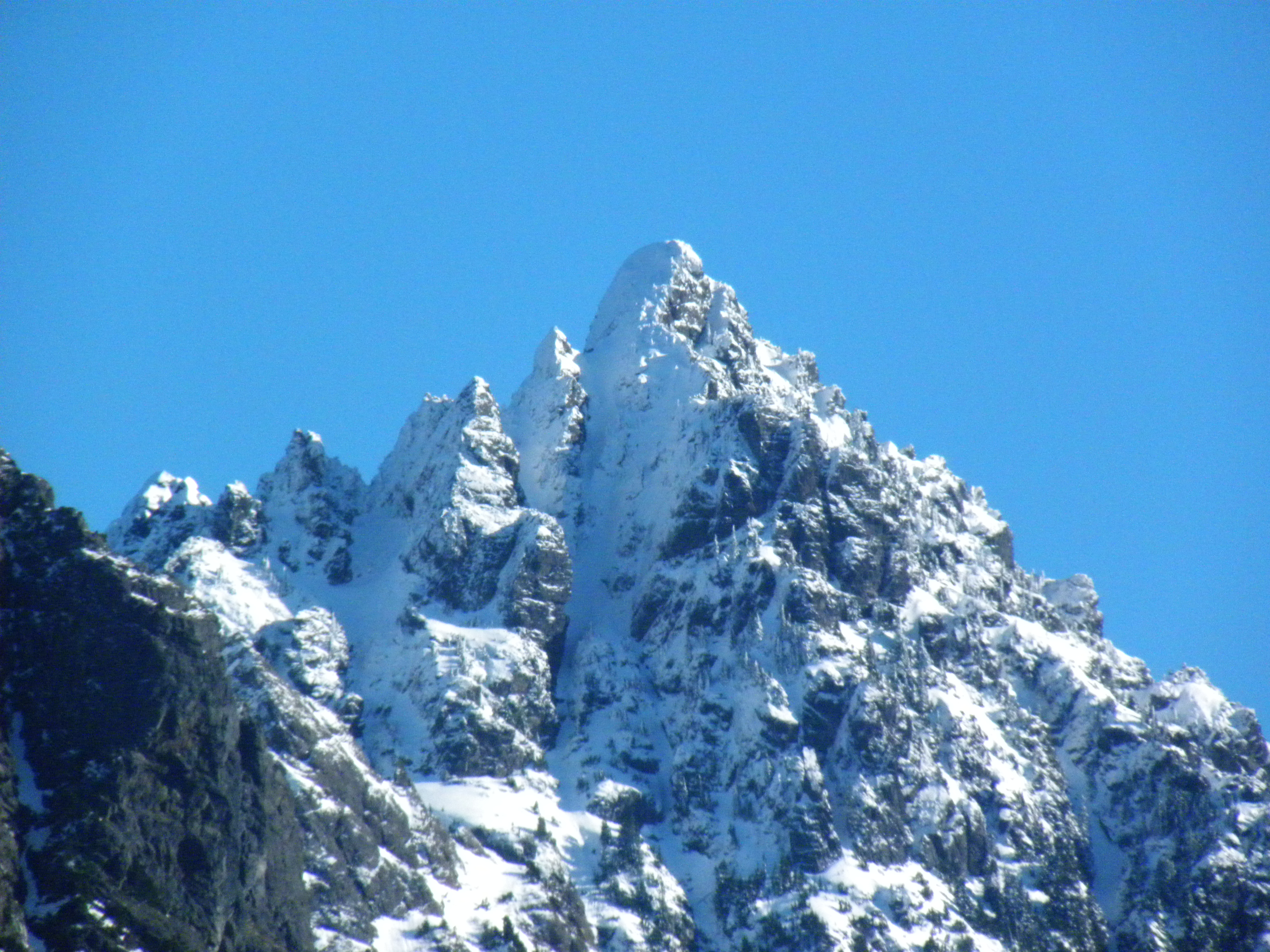
- Merchant Peak

Highest point
- Elevation: 6,113 ft (1,863 m)
- Prominence: 1,153 ft (350 m)
- Parent peak: Gunn Peak (6,244 ft)
- Isolation: 1.29 mi (2.08 km)
- Coordinates: 47°48′05″N 121°25′55″W

Naming
- Etymology: Andrew Merchant

Geography
- Location within Washington (state) Location within the United States
- Interactive map of Merchant Peak
- Country: United States
- State: Washington
- County: Snohomish
- Protected area: Wild Sky Wilderness
- Parent range: Cascade Range
- Topo map: USGS Baring

Climbing
- Easiest route: Scrambling

Merchant Peak is a 6,113-foot (1,863-metre) mountain summit located in Snohomish County, Washington. The mountain is part of the Cascade Range and is the sixth-highest point of the Wild Sky Wilderness. The nearest higher neighbor is Gunn Peak, 1.26 mi (2.03 km) to the northwest, and Baring Mountain lies 1.53 mi (2.46 km) to the south. Precipitation runoff from the mountain drains into tributaries of the Skykomish River. The mountain's toponym was officially adopted in 1918 for Andrew Merchant, who made many mining claims around Trout Creek which is north of the peak.

== Climate ==
Merchant Peak is located in the marine west coast climate zone of western North America. Most weather fronts coming from the Pacific Ocean travel northeast toward the Cascade Mountains. As fronts approach the North Cascades, they are forced upward by the peaks of the Cascade Range (orographic lift), causing them to drop their moisture in the form of rain or snow onto the Cascades. As a result, the west side of the North Cascades experiences high precipitation, especially during the winter months in the form of snowfall. Because of maritime influence, snow tends to be wet and heavy, resulting in high avalanche danger. During winter months, weather is usually cloudy, but due to high pressure systems over the Pacific Ocean that intensify during summer months, there is often little or no cloud cover during the summer. Due to its temperate climate and proximity to the Pacific Ocean, areas west of the Cascade Crest very rarely experience temperatures below 0 °F (−18 °C) or above 80 °F (27 °C).

== Geology ==
The North Cascades feature some of the most rugged topography in the Cascade Range with craggy peaks, spires, ridges, and deep glacial valleys. Geological events occurring many years ago created the diverse topography and drastic elevation changes over the Cascade Range leading to the various climate differences.

The history of the formation of the Cascade Mountains dates back millions of years ago to the late Eocene Epoch. With the North American Plate overriding the Pacific Plate, episodes of volcanic igneous activity persisted. In addition, small fragments of the oceanic and continental lithosphere called terranes created the North Cascades about 50 million years ago.

During the Pleistocene period dating back over two million years ago, glaciation advancing and retreating repeatedly scoured the landscape leaving deposits of rock debris. The U-shaped cross section of the river valleys is a result of recent glaciation. Uplift and faulting in combination with glaciation have been the dominant processes which have created the tall peaks and deep valleys of the North Cascades area.

== History ==
On May 16, 1965, a Cessna 180 carrying Seattle city councilman Wing Luke, businessman Sidney Gerber, and Kate Ladue crashed on Merchant Peak, killing all three aboard. The wreckage was discovered three years later during a geological survey and confirmed by the Washington State Aeronautics Commission.

== Gallery ==
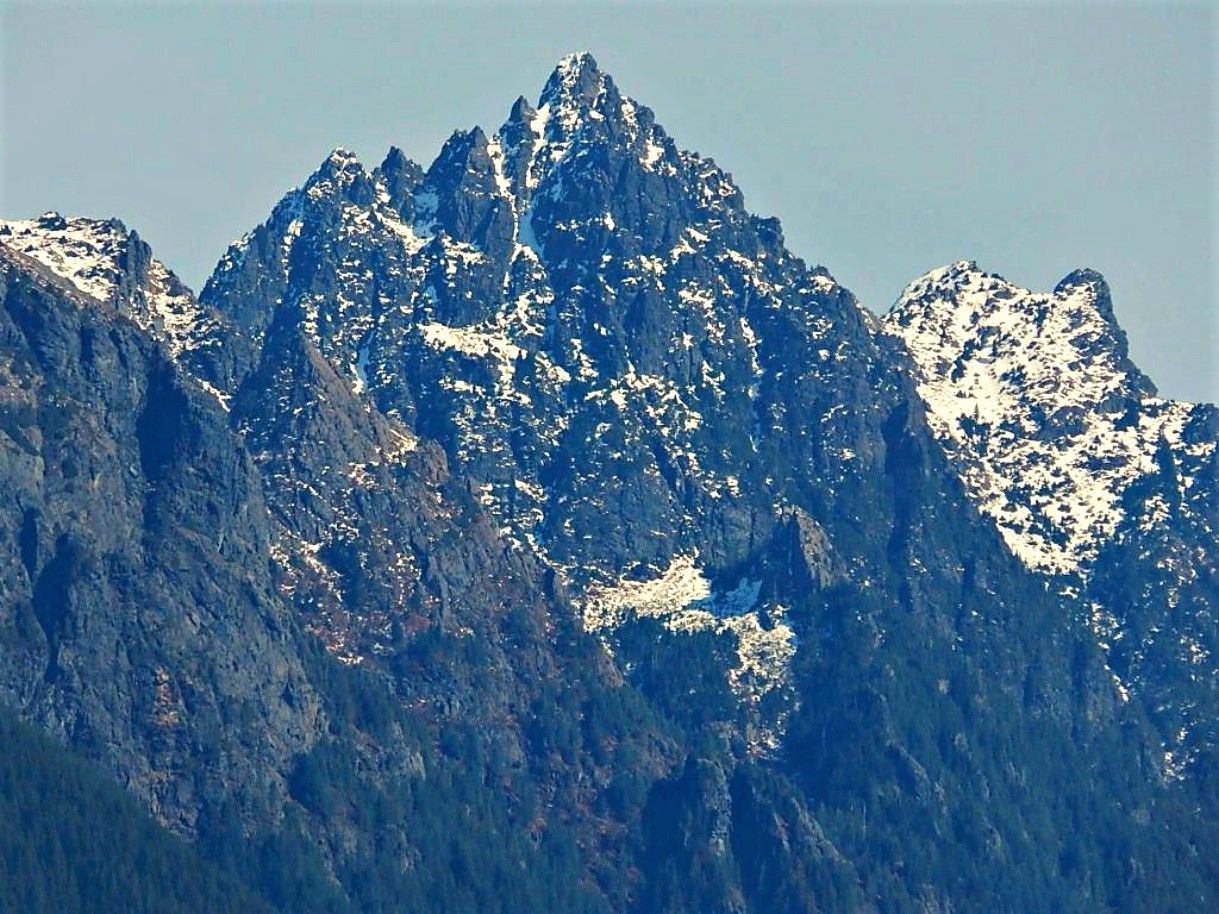
Merchant Peak centered, with the southeast subsidiary subpeak (5,831 ft) to the right. The subpeak is mistakenly labelled as Merchant Peak on old USGS maps.

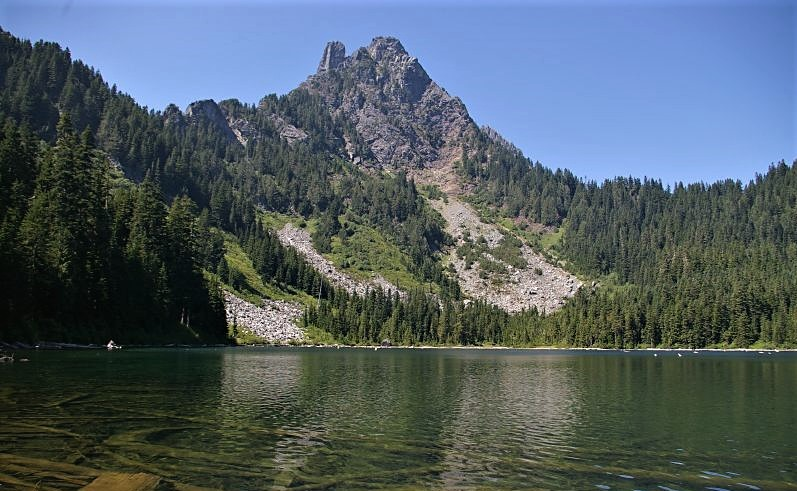
The southeast subsidiary subpeak (5,831 ft) of Merchant Peak from Eagle Lake.

== See also ==
- Geography of the North Cascades
