= Spire Mountain =

Mountain in Washington (state), United States

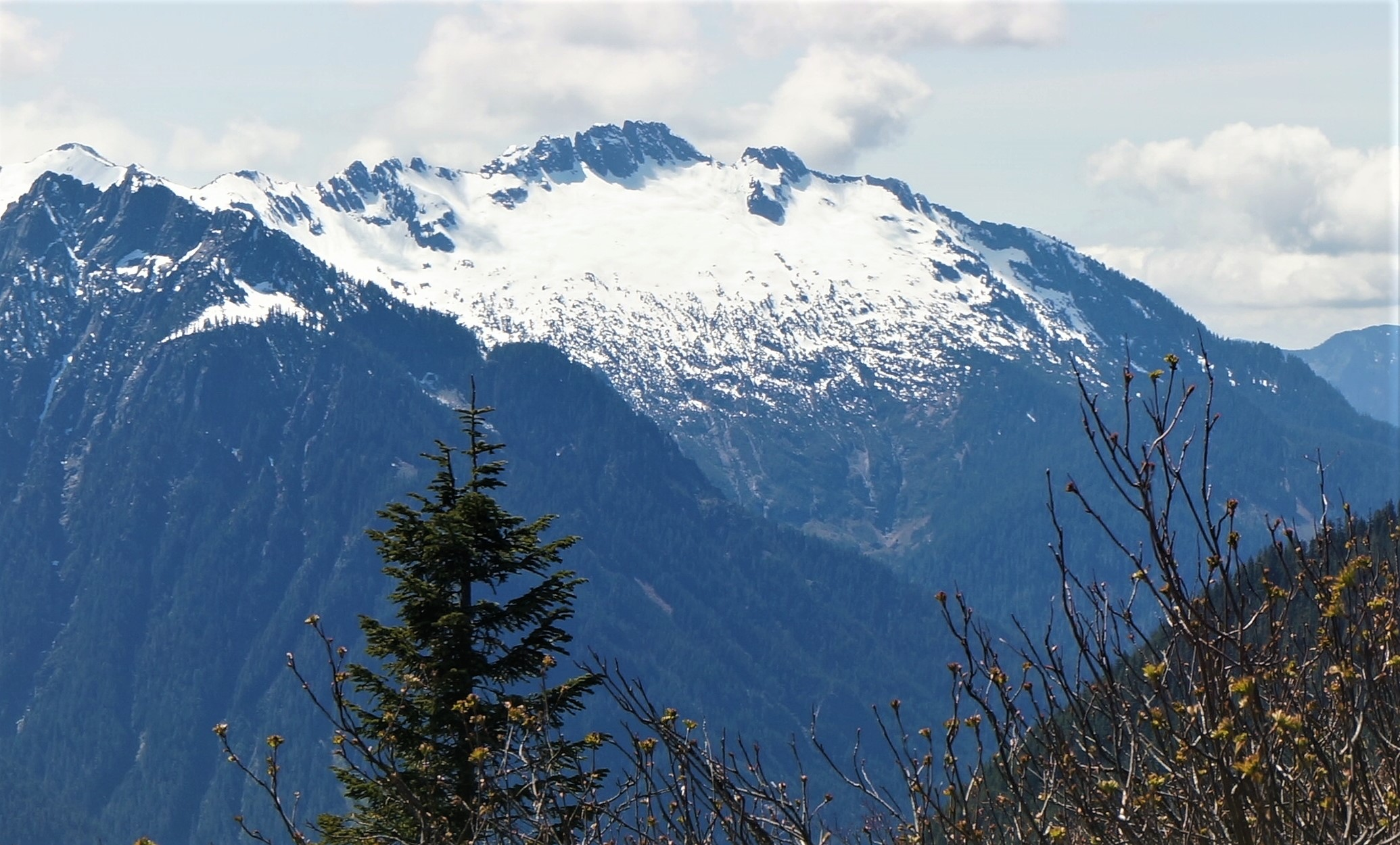
- ENE aspect, from West Cady Ridge

Highest point
- Elevation: 6,213 ft (1,894 m)
- Prominence: 1,853 ft (565 m)
- Parent peak: Gunn Peak (6,244 ft)
- Isolation: 3.92 mi (6.31 km)
- Coordinates: 47°51′56″N 121°24′22″W

Geography
- Location within Washington (state) Location within the United States
- Interactive map of Spire Mountain
- Location: Snohomish County, Washington, US
- Parent range: Cascade Range
- Topo map: USGS Baring

Geology
- Rock type: gabbro

Climbing
- First ascent: May 1934, Dwight Dean, Kenneth Chapman
- Easiest route: class 4-5

Spire Mountain is a 6,213-foot (1,894-metre) Cascade Range mountain summit located in Snohomish County, Washington. It is set 7 miles (11 km) northeast of the town of Index, and 4 miles (6.4 km) north-northeast of Gunn Peak, its nearest higher neighbor. This mountain is situated in the Wild Sky Wilderness, on land managed by Mount Baker-Snoqualmie National Forest. Precipitation runoff from the mountain drains into tributaries of the Skykomish River. The first ascent of the highest Northwest Spire was made in 1934 by Dwight Dean and Kenneth Chapman. The first ascent of the Central Spire (6,200-ft) was made in 1938 by Karl Boyer, Lyman Boyer, and David Lind. The Southeast Spire is estimated as 6,185 feet in elevation.

== Climate ==
Spire Mountain is located in the marine west coast climate zone of western North America. Most weather fronts originate in the Pacific Ocean, and travel northeast toward the Cascade Mountains. As fronts approach the North Cascades, they are forced upward by the peaks of the Cascade Range (Orographic lift), causing them to drop their moisture in the form of rain or snowfall onto the Cascades. As a result, the west side of the North Cascades experiences high precipitation, especially during the winter months in the form of snowfall. Because of maritime influence, snow tends to be wet and heavy, resulting in high avalanche danger. Due to its temperate climate and proximity to the Pacific Ocean, areas west of the Cascade Crest very rarely experience temperatures below 0 °F (−18 °C) or above 80 °F (27 °C). During winter months, weather is usually cloudy, but, due to high pressure systems over the Pacific Ocean that intensify during summer months, there is often little or no cloud cover during the summer. The months July through September offer the most favorable weather for viewing or climbing this peak.

== Geology ==
The North Cascades features some of the most rugged topography in the Cascade Range with craggy peaks, spires, ridges, and deep glacial valleys. Geological events occurring many years ago created the diverse topography and drastic elevation changes over the Cascade Range leading to the various climate differences.

The history of the formation of the Cascade Mountains dates back millions of years ago to the late Eocene Epoch. With the North American Plate overriding the Pacific Plate, episodes of volcanic igneous activity persisted. In addition, small fragments of the oceanic and continental lithosphere called terranes created the North Cascades about 50 million years ago.

During the Pleistocene period dating back over two million years ago, glaciation advancing and retreating repeatedly scoured the landscape leaving deposits of rock debris. The U-shaped cross section of the river valleys is a result of recent glaciation. Uplift and faulting in combination with glaciation have been the dominant processes which have created the tall peaks and deep valleys of the North Cascades area.

== Gallery ==
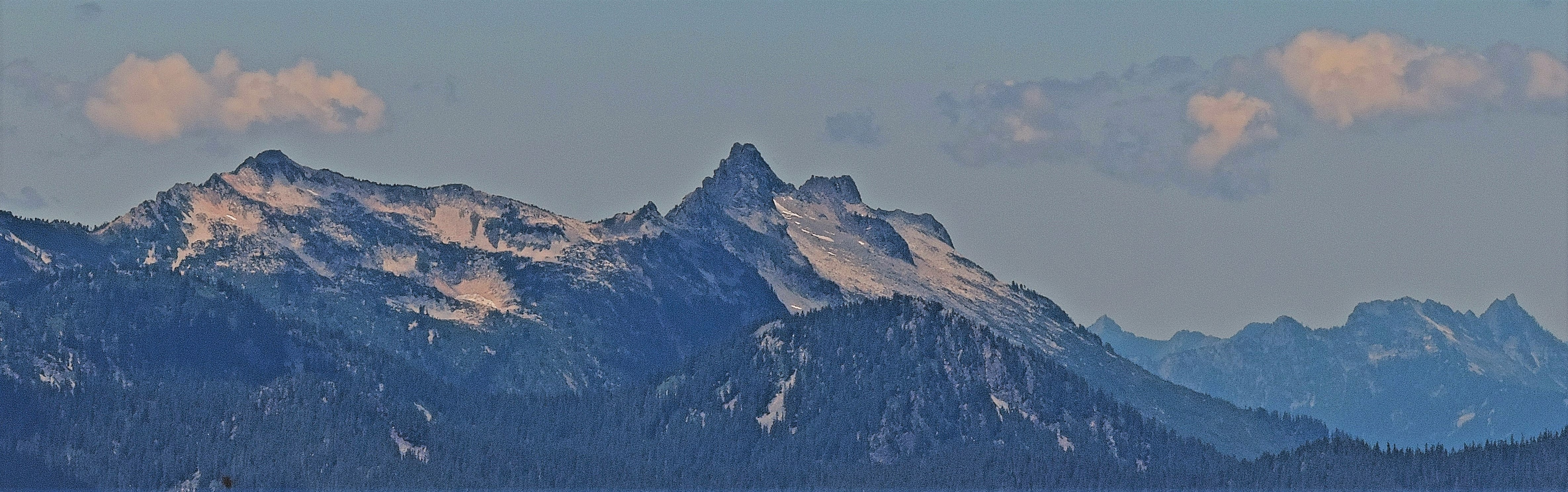
Southeast aspect of Spire Mountain seen from Scorpion Mountain

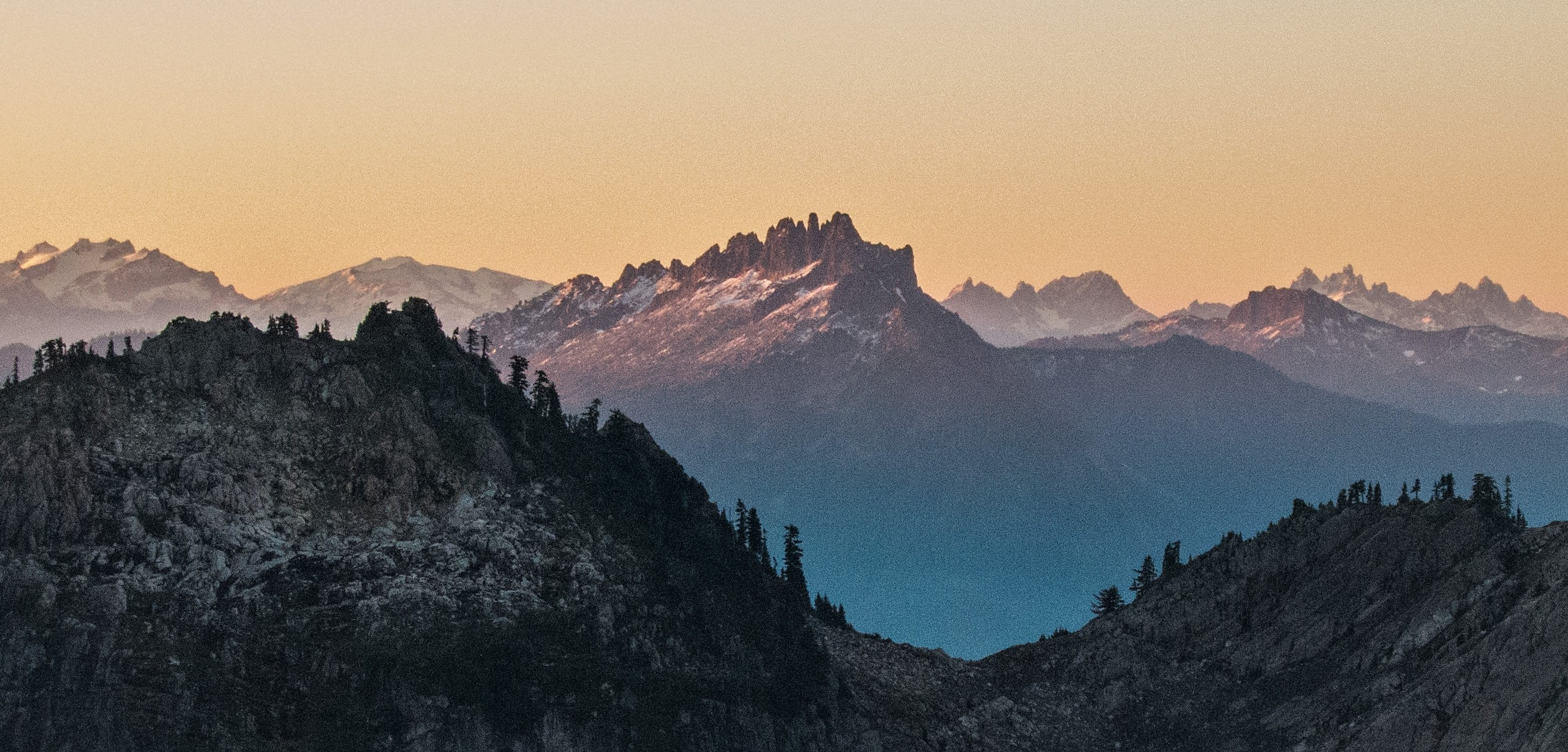
North aspect of Spire Mountain (centered) seen from Gothic Basin.
