= Baring Mountain =

Mountain in Washington (state), United States

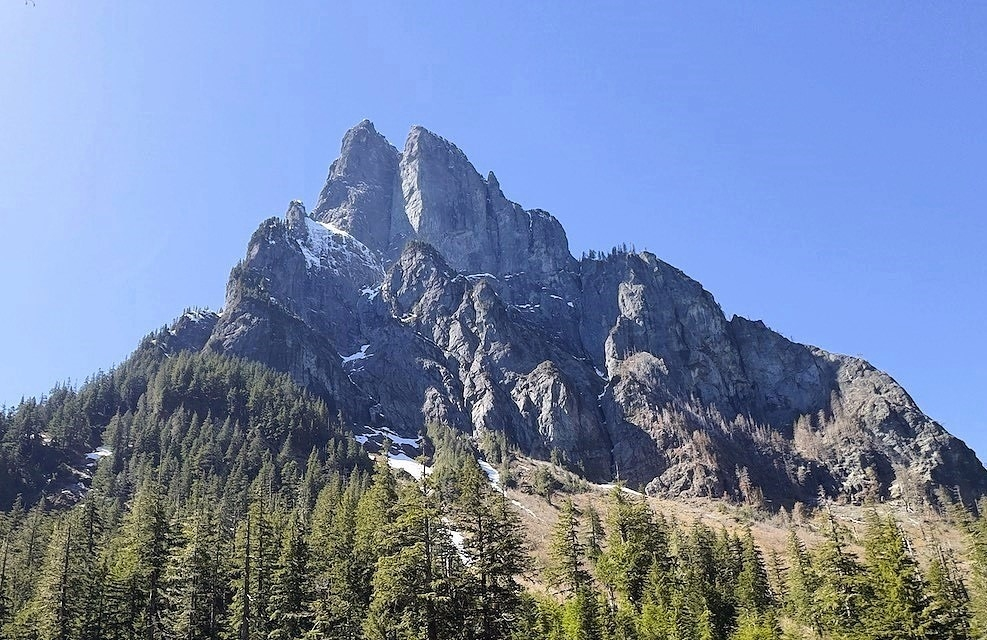
- Baring Mountain as seen from Barclay Lake

Highest point
- Elevation: 6,127 ft (1,868 m) NAVD 88
- Prominence: 2,444 ft (745 m)
- Parent peak: Gunn Peak
- Coordinates: 47°46′45″N 121°26′09″W

Geography
- Location within Washington (state) Location within the United States
- Country: United States
- State: Washington
- County: Snohomish
- Protected area: Wild Sky Wilderness
- Parent range: Cascade Range
- Topo map: USGS Baring

Climbing
- First ascent: July 28, 1897 by John Charlton, Albert H. Sylvester (first recorded ascent)
- Easiest route: Hike/scramble

Baring Mountain (or Mount Baring), is a peak in the central part of the Cascade Range of Washington, United States. It lies about 2 miles (3.2 km) northeast of the Skykomish River and US Highway 2, at the western edge of the Cascades in the Mount Baker-Snoqualmie National Forest. It is about 6 miles (9.7 km) east of Mount Index and Barclay Lake at its base is accessible via Forest Road 6024 and a 2.2-mile (3.5 km) hike.

Baring Mountain was previously known as Mount Index before being renamed in 1917. The peak currently named Mount Index was known as West Index Mountain until that time.

Like Mount Index, Baring Mountain is a dramatic peak, because of its steep rise above low footings, the Skykomish River is at an elevation of only 760 feet (230 m), and particularly because of its large, sheer Northeast Face, which drops about 750 m (2,460 ft) in only 250 m (820 ft) and drops another 1,250 ft (380 m) at a lower angle to Barclay Lake.

The first recorded ascent of Baring Mountain was on July 28, 1897, by John Charlton and Albert H. Sylvester. However given the nontechnical nature of the easiest ascent route a much earlier Native American ascent is possible. The standard route on the mountain is the Northwest Ridge Route, involving hiking (off-trail, some of it through brush) and a small amount of scrambling at the top.

The northeast aspect of the peak is home to several routes of great length and technical difficulty (up to Grade VI, 5.12b). The northeast face was first climbed on July 13, 1960, by Ed Cooper and Don Gordon Claunch.

The first BASE jump off Baring Mountain was done by Todd Higley and Josh Whipple, in August 2001. Michael McMurtrey, of Seattle, was the first to jump from Baring using a wingsuit, in June 2004. In August 2025, a man died after BASE jumping off of the mountain.

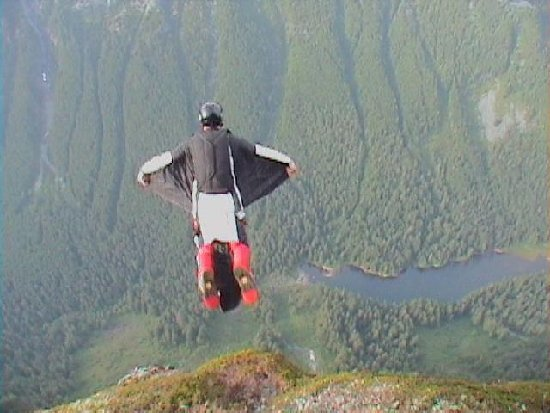
BASE Wingsuit Picture: First BASE wingsuit jumps off Baring Mountain (June, 2004)

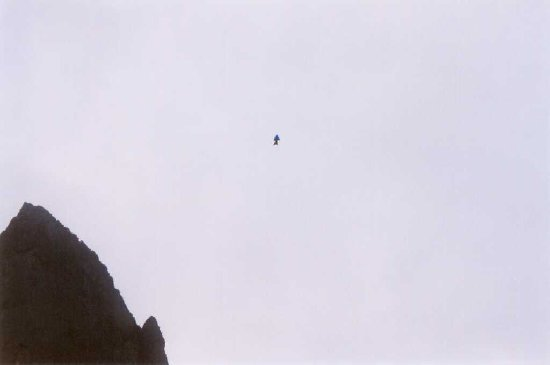
BASE Wingsuit Picture: First BASE wingsuit jumps off Baring Mountain (June, 2004)

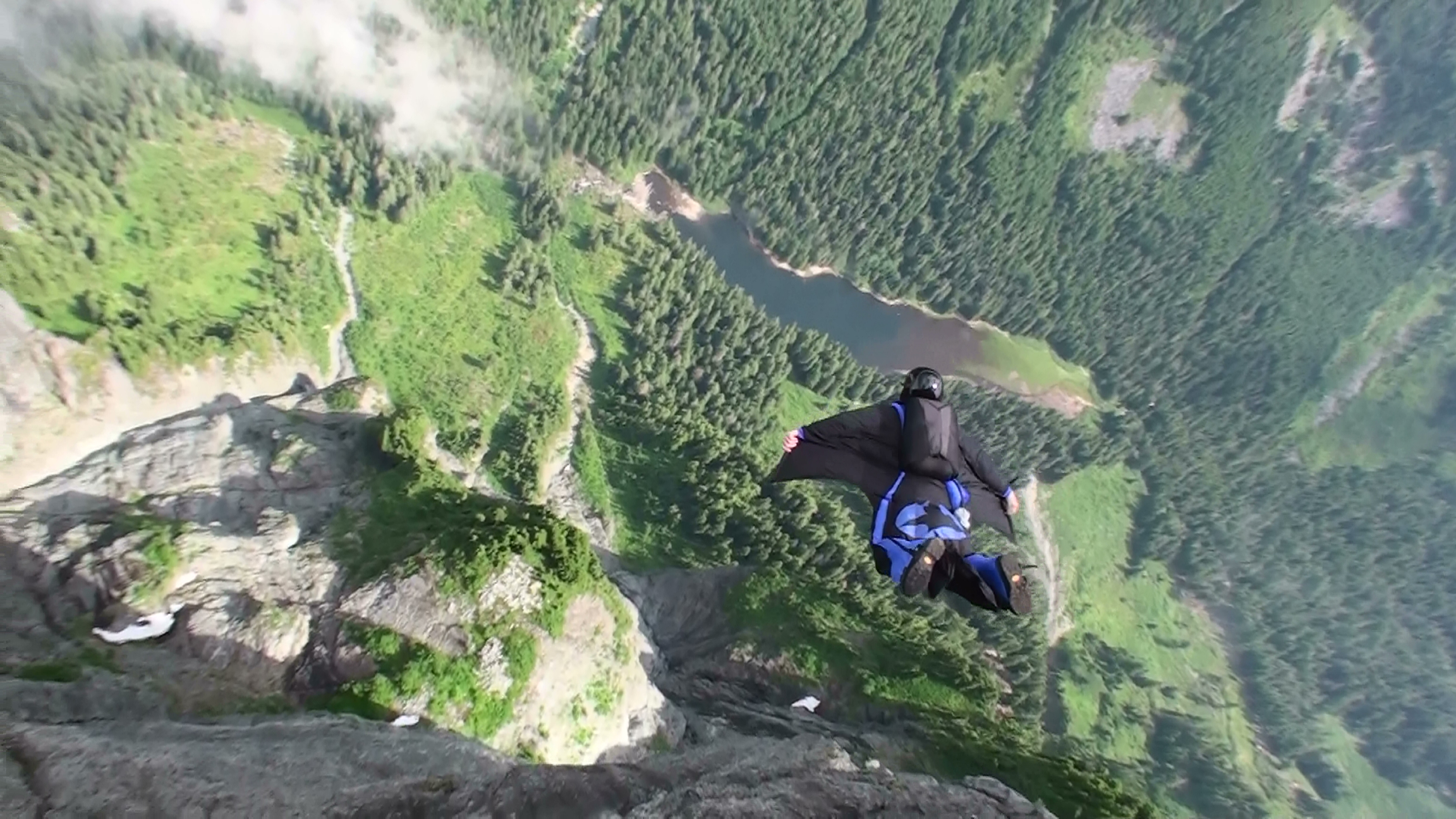
BASE Wingsuit Picture: Recent BASE wingsuit jump off Baring Mountain (September, 2010)
