= Wing Luke =

Chinese-born American lawyer (1925–1965)

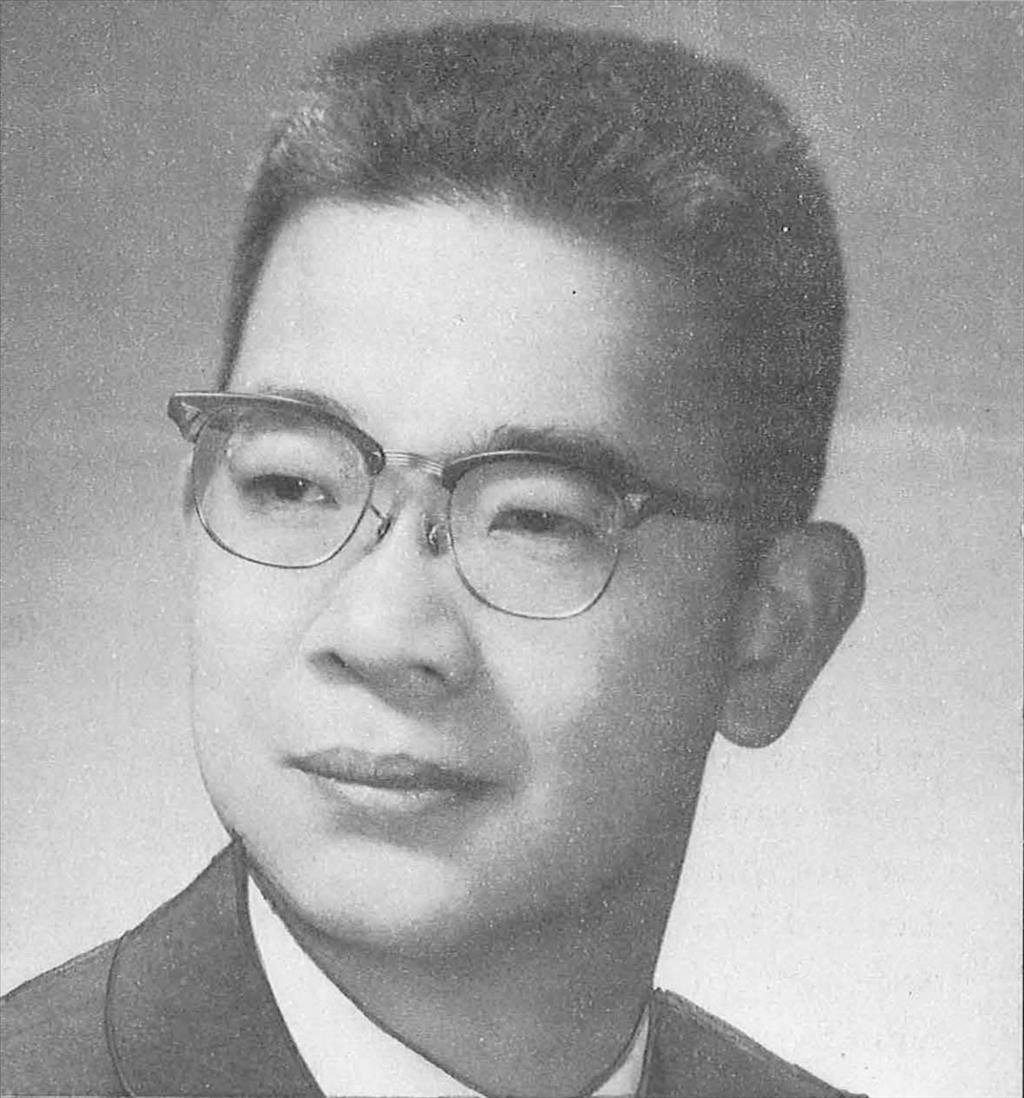
- Luke in a 1962 City Council campaign brochure image.

Assistant Attorney General of Washington
- In office 1957–1962

Member of the Seattle City Council for position 5
- In office March 13, 1962 – May 16, 1965

Personal details
- Born: Luk Wing-chong; February 18, 1925 Guangdong Province, China
- Died: May 16, 1965 (aged 40) Snohomish County, Washington, U.S.
- Party: Democratic
- Education: University of Washington (BA, LLB)
- Military career
- Allegiance: United States
- Branch: United States Army
- Service years: 1944-1946
- Conflicts: World War II; Pacific War; Philippines campaign

Chinese name
- Traditional Chinese: 陸榮昌
- Simplified Chinese: 陆荣昌
Transcriptions
Standard Mandarin
- Hanyu Pinyin: Lù Róngchāng
Yue: Cantonese
- Jyutping: Luk^{6} Wing^{4}coeng^{1}

Wing Chong Luke (Chinese: 陸榮昌; February 18, 1925 – May 16, 1965) was a Chinese-born American lawyer and politician. He served as an assistant attorney general of Washington for the state civil rights division from 1957 to 1962. He was later a member of the Seattle City Council for position 5 from 1962 until his death in 1965 in a plane crash.

Luke was the first Asian American to hold elected office in the state, he was cited as an inspiration by Gary Locke, the first Chinese American governor of Washington. The Wing Luke Museum in Seattle is named in his honor.

== Early life and education ==
=== Family background and upbringing ===
Luke was born on February 18, 1925, in a small town near Canton (Guangzhou). His grandfather had run a laundry in Seattle, but exclusion laws forced Luke's father to return to China. When Luke was five, his family moved to the United States, but he did not settle in Seattle until 1931, at the age of six. Upon their arrival in Seattle, the family saved to open a modest laundry and grocery store in the University District. Luke was the oldest of six children. The artist-turned-Hollywood actor Keye Luke was one of his cousins.

While in school, Luke was often teased for his Chinese origins and on multiple occasions got into physical confrontations with bullies. After the outbreak of World War II, Luke's family was evicted from their apartment by their landlady for looking Japanese, which would instill in Luke a fire for social activism for the rest of his life. However, he eventually became the Roosevelt High School student body president. In 1944, his grades and civic activities earned him an invitation as a high school consultant for a White House Conference on juvenile problems, though Luke's induction into the army would prevent him from attending.

=== Military service ===
Only halfway through his senior year of high school, Luke was inducted into the U.S. Army. Initially in the Army Specialized Training Program, he then joined the infantry and field artillery and was acting first sergeant and regimental S-1 sergeant in the 40th division Field Artillery. He served in Guam, Korea, New Guinea, New Britain and the Philippines, where he received the Bronze Star Medal and six combat stars. During a furlough, he supported his family after they were evicted from their apartment, when they were lumped in with Japanese Americans as "enemy aliens", an incident which would inspire his later activism.

=== Higher education ===
Following his service, Luke entered the University of Washington. As in high school, Luke was a prominent leader. He was President of his sophomore class, the U.W. YMCA, the Baptist-Disciples' Student Center, the U.W. Red Cross, U.W. Young Democrats, and the committee chairman of A.S.U.W. Publications. He graduated from the university with a B.A. in political science and public administration. He did graduate work in the same fields at the American University in Washington, D.C. He then attended the UW School of Law to earn an LL.B.

== Legal and political career ==
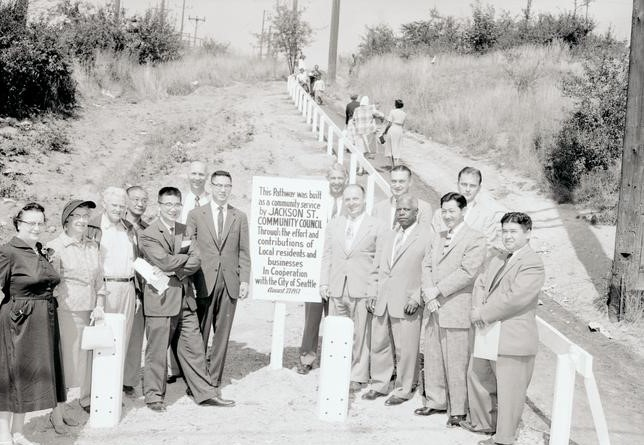
Wing Luke opening a ramp between Jackson and Main in 1957.

Luke was appointed Assistant Attorney General of the State of Washington, in the Civil Rights Division and served in that capacity from 1957 to 1962. In 1962, Luke decided to run for an open seat on the Seattle City Council. Running on the slogan "You are not electing a platform, but a Councilman," Luke maintained a pragmatic position on the issues and proved successful at mobilizing young volunteers. Despite having to defend against criticism of "fence sitting," accusations of communism, and racial slurs, Luke won the council seat with a landslide of 30,000 votes and was sworn in on March 13, 1962. He became the first Asian American to hold elected office in the Pacific Northwest as well as the first person of color to hold a Seattle City Council seat.

As a Councilmember, Luke focused on urban renewal, historical preservation, and civil rights. The latter focus proved controversial, and Luke's open-housing ordinance (created to prevent discrimination in the sale or rent of Seattle real estate) faced heavy resistance, though it eventually passed. For support in his community renewal efforts, Luke turned to a variety of local organizations he was active in, such as the Urban League, the Chinese Community Service Organization, the Japanese American Citizens League, and the Jackson Street Community Council.

Generally diplomatic and optimistic in his approach, Luke was notably skilled at appealing to diverse communities, having once learned to sing Norway's entire national anthem in preparation for an address to the local Norwegian community. His political successes and general popularity led to speculation over a potential congressional or mayoral run.

== Death and legacy ==
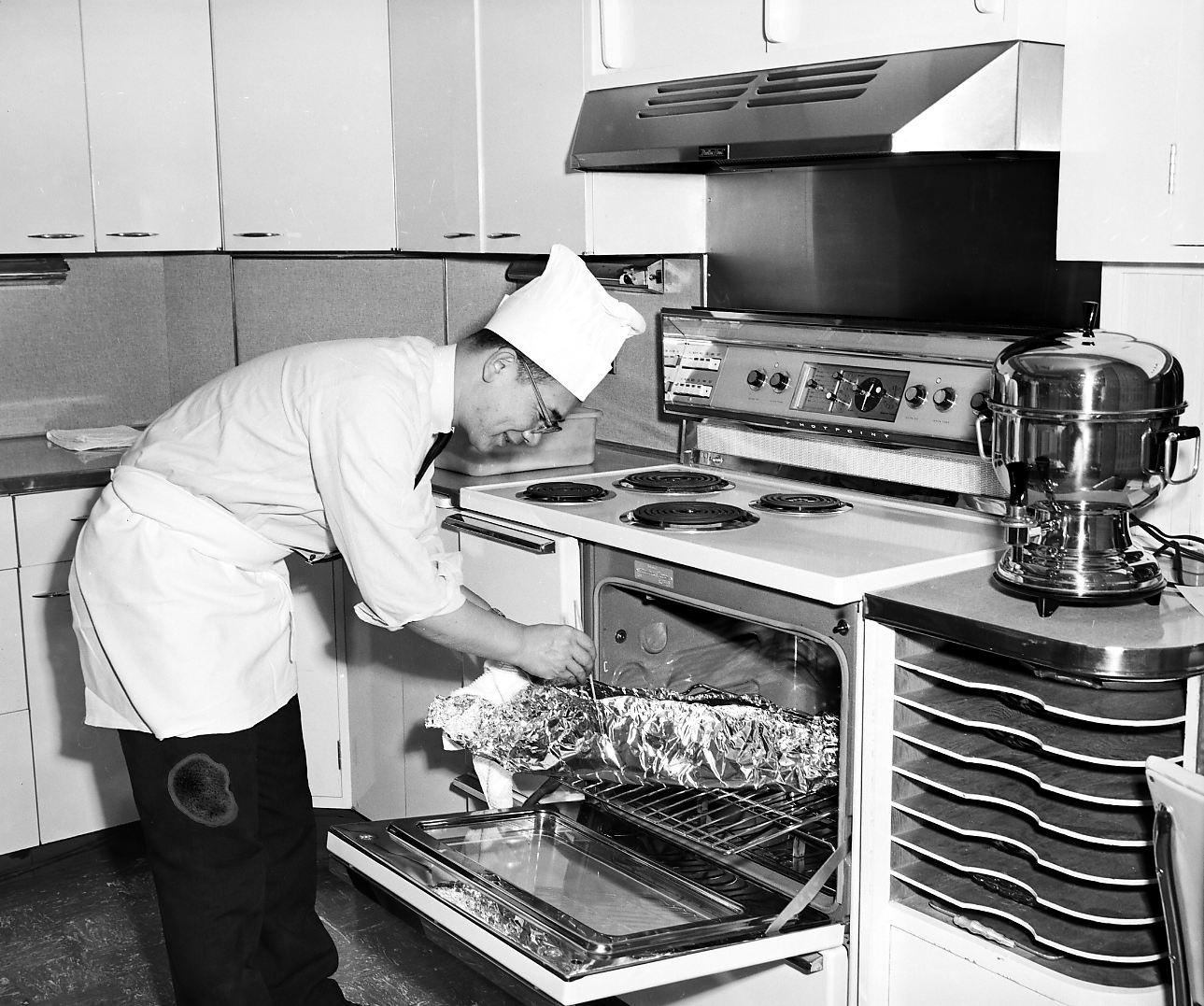
Wing Luke in kitchen, circa 1963

On May 16, 1965, Luke was killed in a plane crash with two others on Merchant Peak in Snohomish County, while returning from a fishing trip in Okanogan County. The wreckage was not found in the Cascade Mountains for more than three years.

Luke is the namesake of multiple institutions. Friends and other supporters of Luke who raised money to search for him started the Wing Luke Memorial Foundation. The money went to the founding of the Wing Luke Museum in 1966 to present the histories and cultures of Asian immigrants and present-day issues of Asian Americans. Luke had reportedly mused about founding such a museum after observing how Chinese American culture in Seattle was so often swept under the rug. The museum remains located in the Seattle Chinatown-International District.

In 2013, the United States Department of the Interior designated the Wing Luke Museum as being affiliated with the National Park Service. Rhea Suh, an Assistant Secretary of the Interior, stated "As a first-generation Asian American and a senior appointee of the Obama Administration, I am humbled and inspired by the public service legacy of Wing Luke".

The Seattle school South Van Asselt School was renamed the Wing Luke Elementary School in 1969. In 2015, the Washington state attorney general's office created the Wing Luke Civil Rights Unit to investigate issues related to discrimination and civil rights.

Gary Locke, the first Chinese-American governor of Washington and U.S. Ambassador to China, has cited Luke as an inspiration.

== Views ==
Luke saw many of his contemporaries forced to live in racialized pockets of Seattle like Beacon Hill (largely Asian Americans) and the Central District (largely African Americans), and felt strongly that the ability to decide where one lived should be a basic right of all citizens. Having firsthand awareness of the effects of racial discrimination, Luke was instrumental in Seattle's passing of an Open Housing Ordinance in 1963 with punitive provisions against racial discrimination in the selling or renting of real estate.

He also fought for civil rights, Indian fishing rights, urban renewal and historic preservation. Luke was particularly concerned with the preservation of Seattle's Central Waterfront, Pioneer Square, and Pike Place Market.

== See also ==
- Keye Luke
- Wing Luke Museum
