= Mount Persis =

Mountain in Washington (state), United States

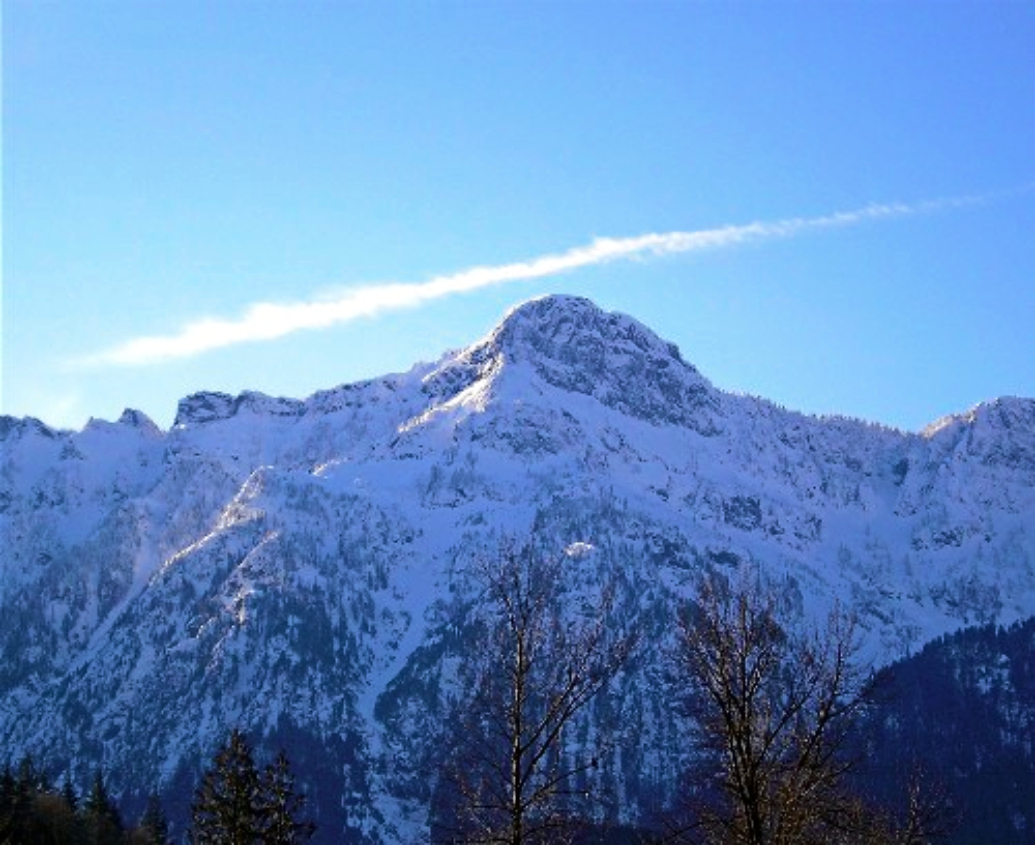
- Northeast aspect

Highest point
- Elevation: 5,464 ft (1,665 m)
- Prominence: 544 ft (170 m)
- Parent peak: Mount Index (5,991 ft)
- Isolation: 1.59 mi (2.56 km)
- Coordinates: 47°47.26′N 121°36.43′W

Naming
- Etymology: Persis Elmina Gunn

Geography
- Location within Washington (state) Location within the United States
- Interactive map of Mount Persis
- Country: United States
- State: Washington
- County: Snohomish
- Parent range: Cascade Range
- Topo map: USGS Index

Geology
- Rock age: 38 million years
- Rock type: Volcanic rock

Climbing
- Easiest route: Trail + class 2 scrambling

Mount Persis is a 5,464-foot (1,665-metre) summit located in Snohomish County, of Washington state. The mountain is part of the Cascade Range and is situated in the Mount Baker-Snoqualmie National Forest. The mountain was named for Persis Gunn (1846–1898), wife of homesteader/miner Amos Gunn who started the nearby town of Index, Washington, and also named nearby Mount Index. Precipitation runoff from the mountain drains into tributaries of the Skykomish River. Topographic relief is significant as the summit rises 4,160 feet (1,270 meters) above Anderson Creek in 0.8 mile (1.3 km). The rocks of Mount Persis are volcanic in origin and are considered amongst some of the earliest expressions of volcanism in the Cascade Mountain range in Washington.

== Climate ==
Mount Persis is located in the marine west coast climate zone of western North America. Most weather fronts originating in the Pacific Ocean travel northeast toward the Cascade Mountains. As fronts approach the Cascades, they are forced upward by the peaks (orographic lift), causing them to drop their moisture in the form of rain or snowfall onto the Cascades. As a result, the west side of the North Cascades experiences high precipitation, especially during the winter months in the form of snowfall. Because of maritime influence, snow tends to be wet and heavy, resulting in high avalanche danger. During winter months, weather is usually cloudy, but, due to high pressure systems over the Pacific Ocean that intensify during summer months, there is often little or no cloud cover during the summer. Due to its temperate climate and proximity to the Pacific Ocean, areas west of the Cascade Crest very rarely experience temperatures below 0 °F (−18 °C) or above 80 °F (27 °C).

== Gallery ==
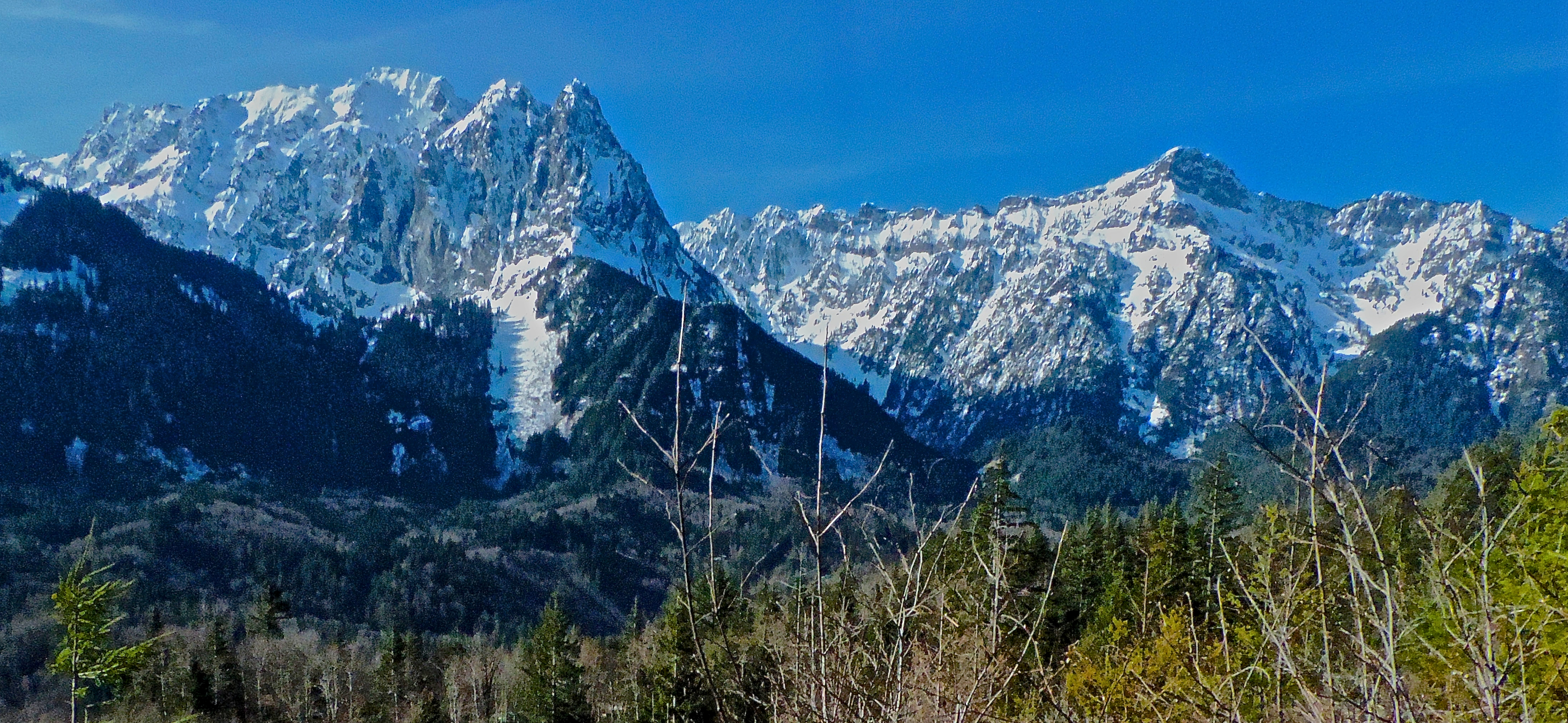
Mount Index (left) and Mount Persis (right)

== See also ==
- Geography of the North Cascades
- Gunn Peak
