= Mount Index =

Mountain in Washington (state), United States

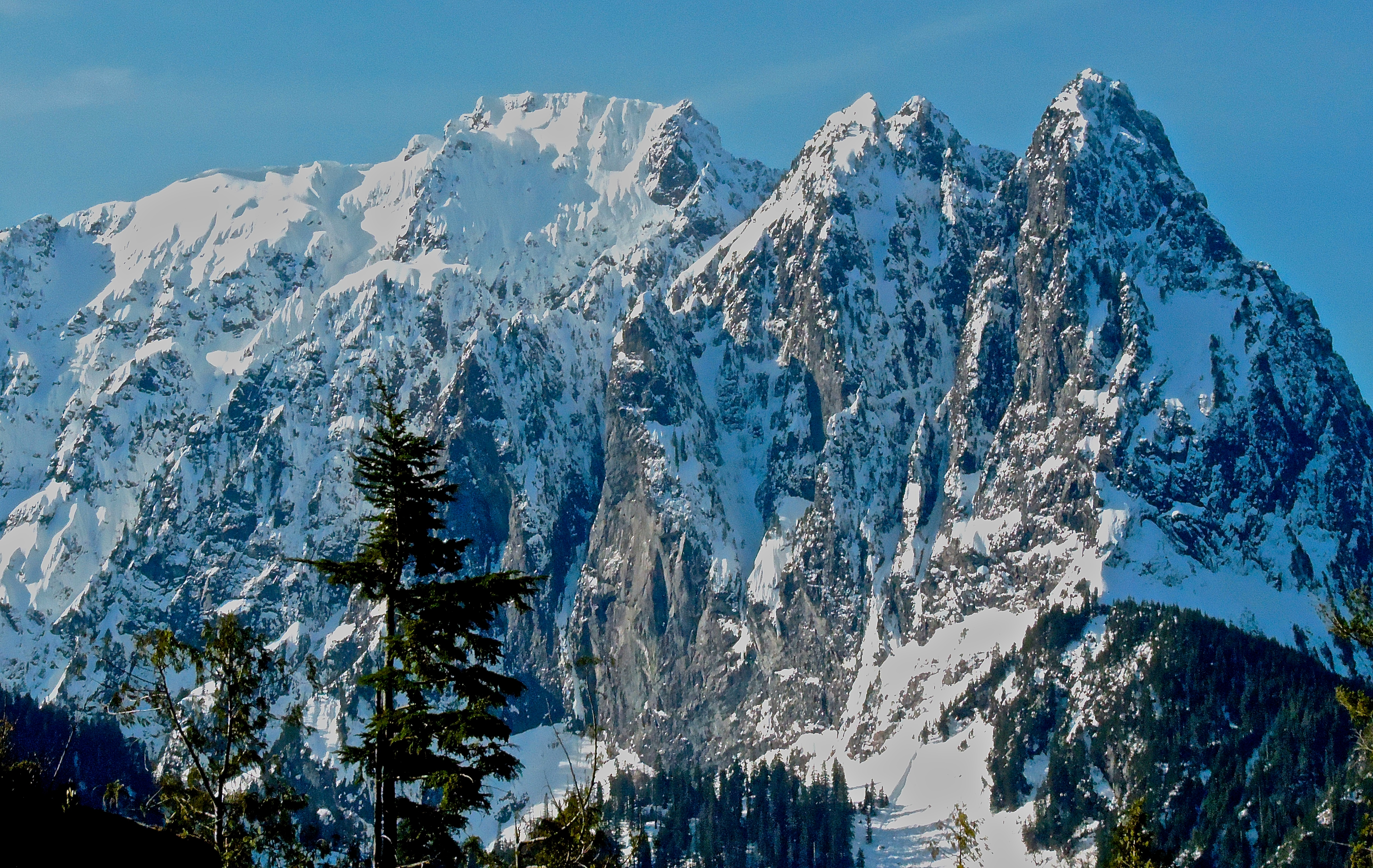
- Northeast aspect

Highest point
- Elevation: 5,991 ft (1,826 m) NGVD 29
- Prominence: 2,991 ft (912 m)
- Coordinates: 47°46′28″N 121°34′51″W

Geography
- Location within Washington (state)
- Location: Snohomish counties, Washington, U.S.
- Parent range: Cascade Range
- Topo map: USGS Index

Climbing
- First ascent: First recorded ascent on October 29, 1911 by H. B. Hinman, Ernest Martin, Lee Pickett, George E. Wright
- Easiest route: Hike/scramble

Mount Index is a peak in the central part of the Cascade Range in Snohomish County, Washington, United States. It lies just south of the Skykomish River and U.S. Route 2, at the western edge of the Cascades. Mount Index features a low elevation relative to peaks higher in the Cascades, and a topographic prominence. It comprises three pointed spires which rise steeply from a very low base. The main peak is the southernmost of the three, while the North Peak rises even more steeply above the valley. For example, it rises more than 4,250 ft (1,300 m) above the lower slopes on the northeast side in less than 1 horizontal mile (1.6 km).

The first recorded ascent of Mount Index (the main peak) was on October 29, 1911, by H. B. Hinman, Ernest Martin, Lee Pickett, George E. Wright. However, they found a flagpole already on the summit, so theirs was certainly not the first ascent. A much earlier ascent by Native Americans is likely. The first ascent of the steeper, more difficult North Peak was in 1929, by Lionel Chute and Victor Kaartinen, by the North Face Route.

The standard route on the main peak climbs the east side of the peak from Lake Serene. The standard route on the North Peak is the North Face Route, which is a long, moderately technical climb (Grade III, Class 5.6).

Mount Index was once known as West Index Mountain, and Baring Mountain was known as Mount Index instead. They were both renamed in 1917.

== Climate ==
Mount Index is located in the marine west coast climate zone of western North America. Most weather fronts originate in the Pacific Ocean, and travel northeast toward the Cascade Mountains. As fronts approach the North Cascades, they are forced upward by the peaks of the Cascade Range, causing them to drop their moisture in the form of rain or snowfall onto the Cascades (Orographic lift). As a result, the west side of the North Cascades experiences high precipitation, especially during the winter months in the form of snowfall. Due to its temperate climate and proximity to the Pacific Ocean, areas west of the Cascade Crest very rarely experience temperatures below 0 °F (−18 °C) or above 80 °F (27 °C). During winter months, weather is usually cloudy, but, due to high pressure systems over the Pacific Ocean that intensify during summer months, there is often little or no cloud cover during the summer. Because of maritime influence, snow tends to be wet and heavy, resulting in high avalanche danger.

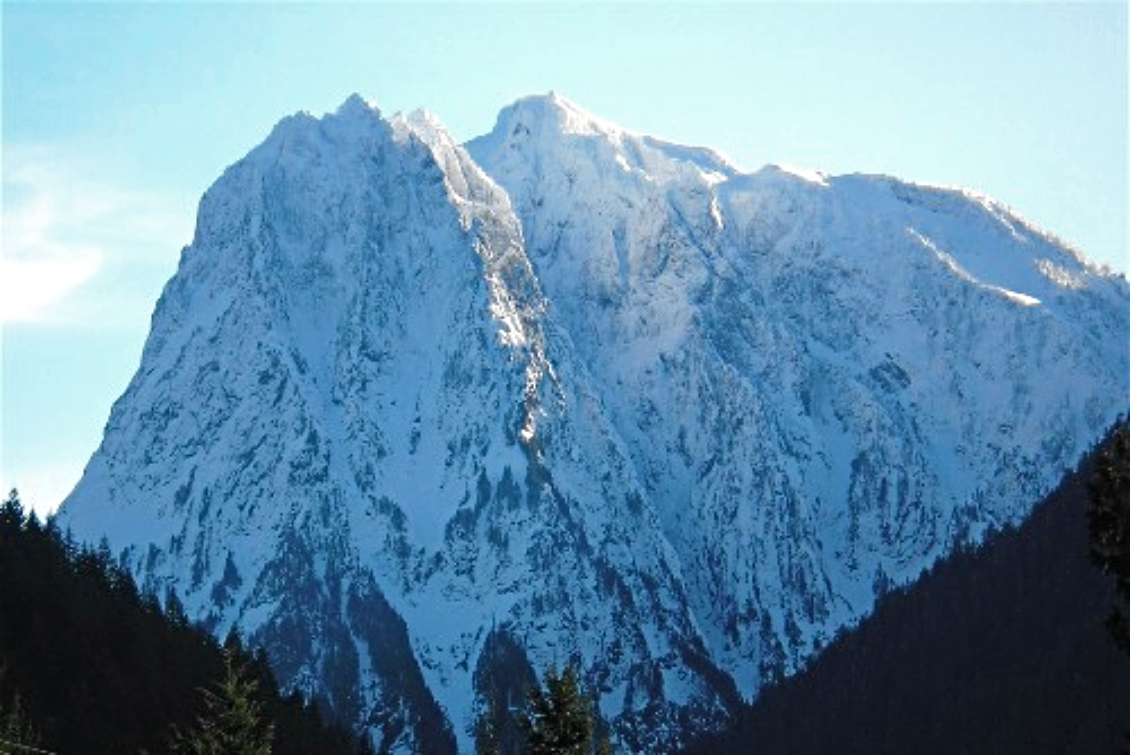
Mount Index in winter

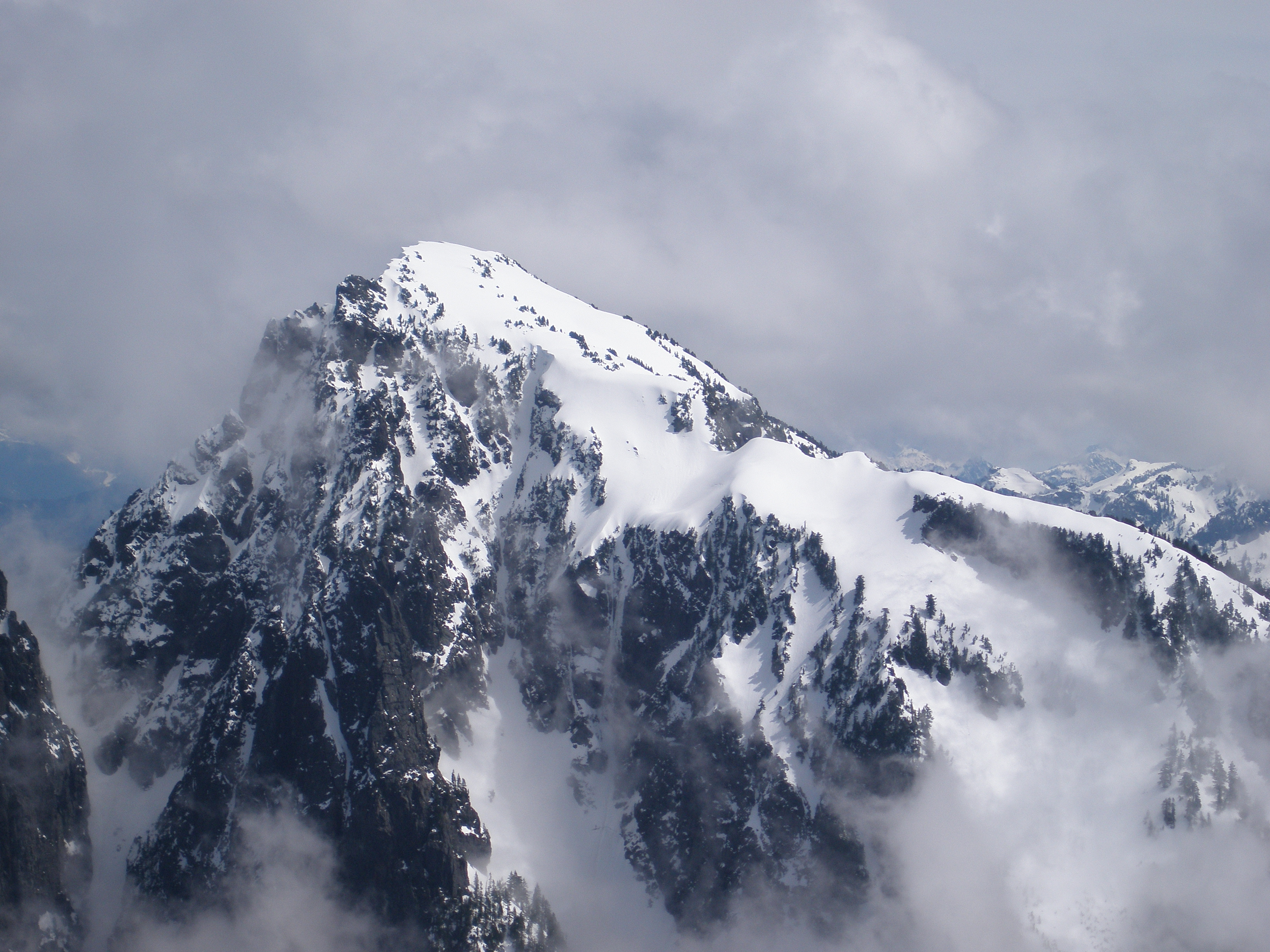
Mt Index from Mount Persis

== See also ==
- Mount Persis
- Geology of the Pacific Northwest
