= Gunn Peak =

Mountain in Washington (state), United States

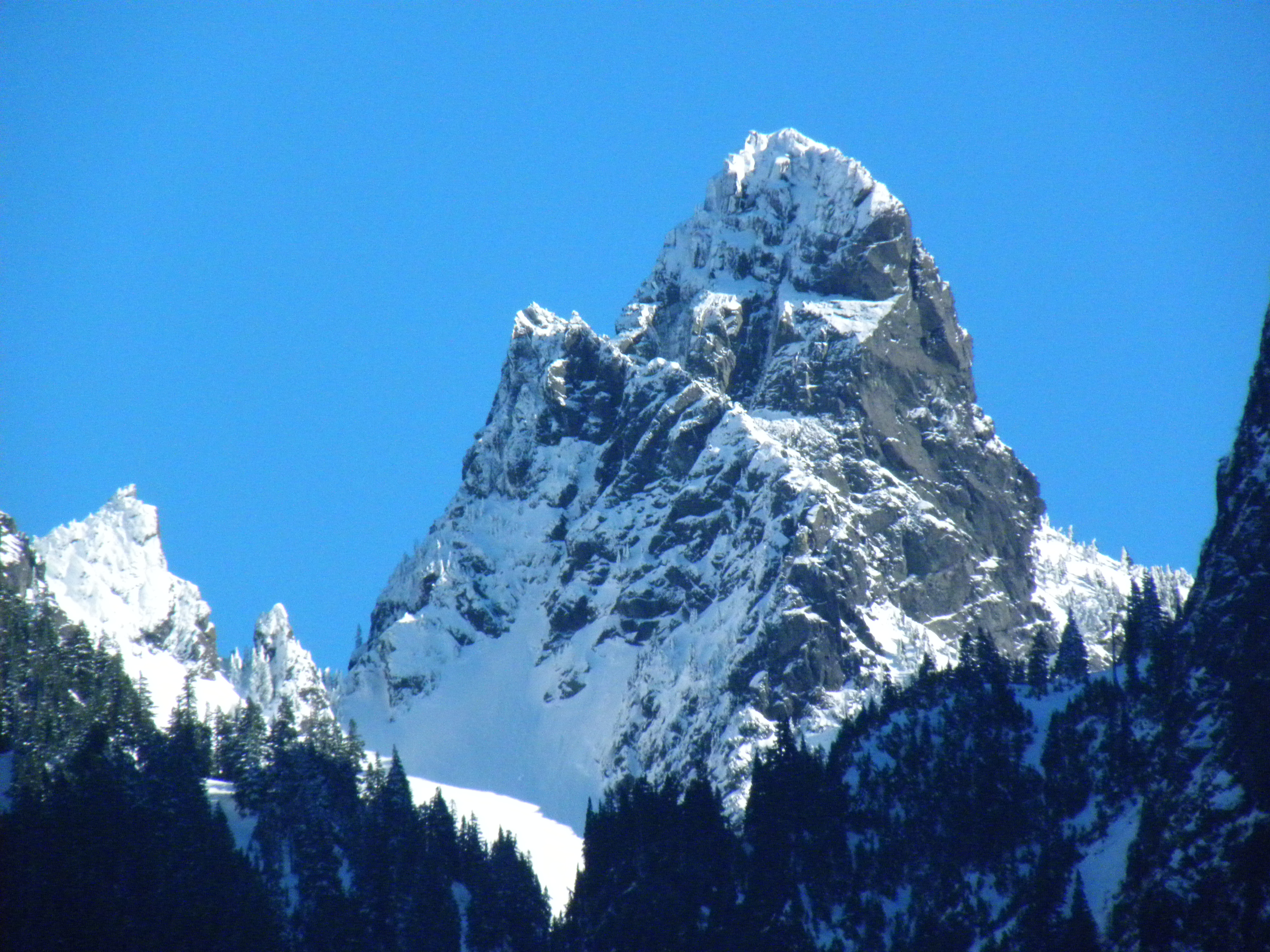
- Gunn Peak, west aspect

Highest point
- Elevation: 6,244 ft (1,903 m) NAVD 88
- Prominence: 3,651 ft (1,110 m)
- Parent peak: Skykomish Peak (6,568 ft)
- Isolation: 10.84 mi (17.45 km)
- Coordinates: 47.8161252°N 121.4477418°W

Geography
- Location within Washington (state) Location within the United States
- Interactive map of Gunn Peak
- Country: United States
- State: Washington
- County: Snohomish
- Protected area: Wild Sky Wilderness
- Parent range: Cascade Range
- Topo map: USGS Baring

Climbing
- First ascent: 1915
- Easiest route: class 3 scrambling

Gunn Peak is a 6,244-foot (1,903-metre) mountain summit in Snohomish County, Washington, United States.

== Description ==
Gunn Peak is the highest point of the Wild Sky Wilderness, and the mountain is part of the Cascade Range. Precipitation runoff from the mountain drains into tributaries of the Skykomish River. Topographic relief is significant as the summit rises approximately 4,100 feet (1,250 meters) above South Fork Trout Creek in one mile (1.6 km). The mountain was named for homesteader/miner Amos Gunn (1843–1907), who started the nearby town of Index, Washington, and also named nearby Mount Index. The first ascent of the summit was made on July 18, 1915, by Dr. Harry B. Hinman, Walter Eriksen, and Louis Lesh on their fifth attempt.

== Climate ==
Gunn Peak is located in the marine west coast climate zone of western North America. Most weather fronts originating in the Pacific Ocean travel northeast toward the Cascade Mountains. As fronts approach, they are forced upward by the peaks of the Cascade Range (orographic lift), causing them to drop their moisture in the form of rain or snowfall onto the Cascades. As a result, the west side of the North Cascades experiences high precipitation, especially during the winter months in the form of snowfall. Because of maritime influence, snow tends to be wet and heavy, resulting in high avalanche danger. Due to its temperate climate and proximity to the Pacific Ocean, areas west of the Cascade Crest very rarely experience temperatures below 0 °F (−18 °C) or above 80 °F (27 °C). During winter months, weather is usually cloudy, but due to high pressure systems over the Pacific Ocean that intensify during summer months, there is often little or no cloud cover during the summer.

== Geology ==
The North Cascades features some of the most rugged topography in the Cascade Range with craggy peaks, spires, ridges, and deep glacial valleys. Geological events occurring many years ago created the diverse topography and drastic elevation changes over the Cascade Range leading to the various climate differences.

The history of the formation of the Cascade Mountains dates back millions of years ago to the late Eocene Epoch. With the North American Plate overriding the Pacific Plate, episodes of volcanic igneous activity persisted. In addition, small fragments of the oceanic and continental lithosphere called terranes created the North Cascades about 50 million years ago.

During the Pleistocene period dating back over two million years ago, glaciation advancing and retreating repeatedly scoured the landscape leaving deposits of rock debris. The U-shaped cross section of the river valleys is a result of recent glaciation. Uplift and faulting in combination with glaciation have been the dominant processes which have created the tall peaks and deep valleys of the North Cascades area.

== Gallery ==
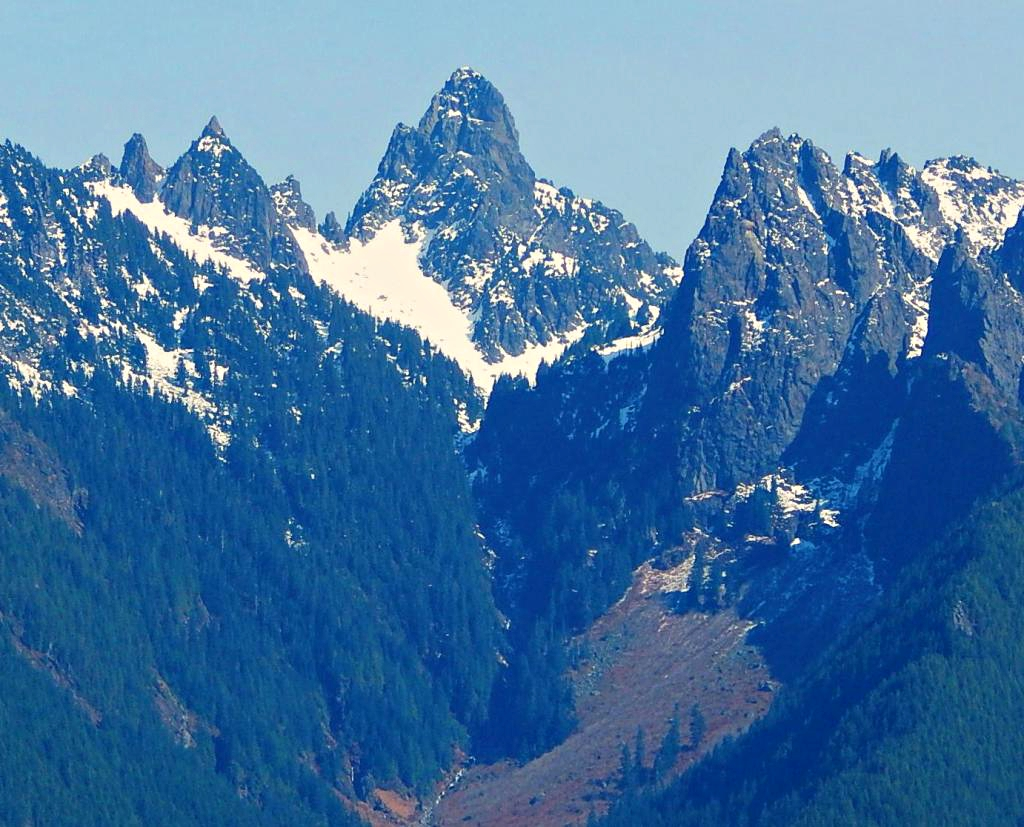
Gunn Peak

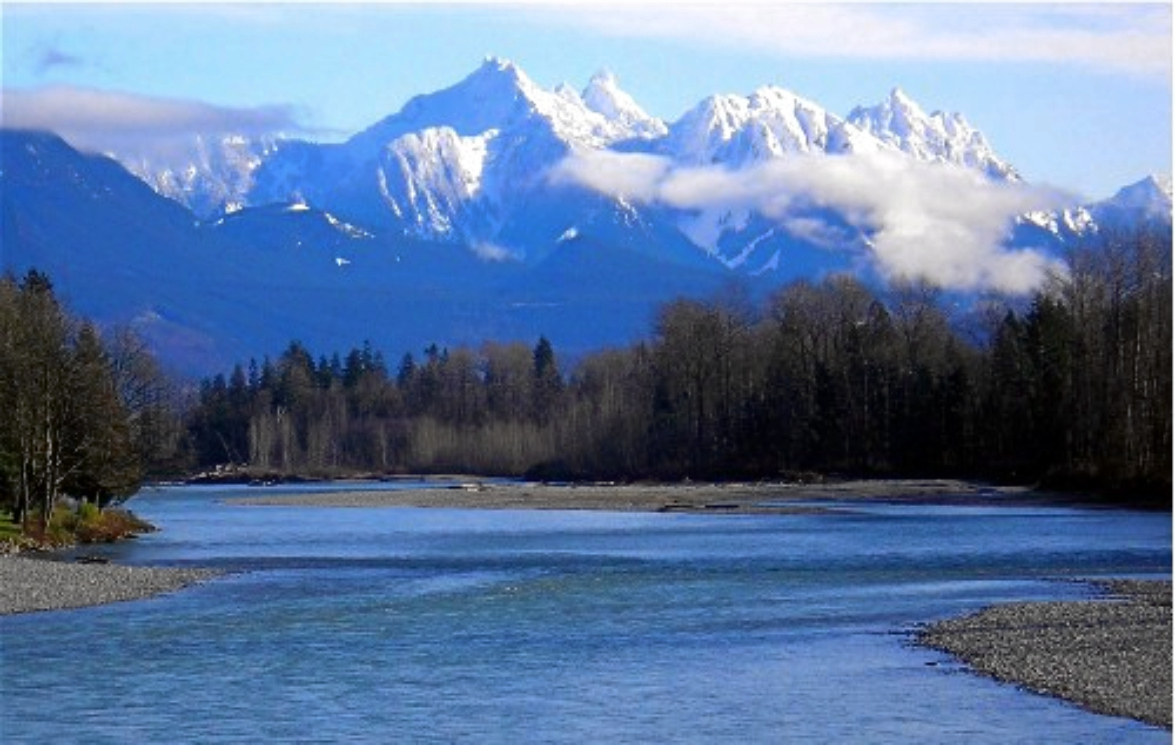
Gunn Peak and Skykomish River

Gunn group viewed from Mount Persis
