= Wild Sky Wilderness =

Wilderness area in Washington, United States

- IUCN category Ib (wilderness area)
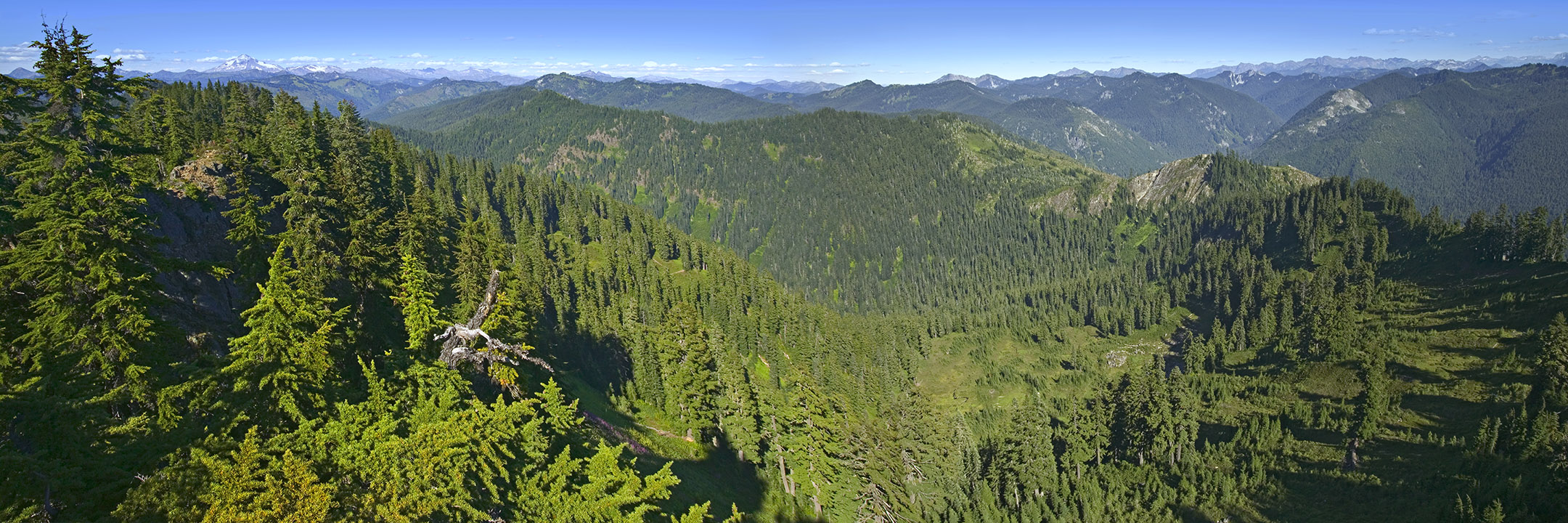

- Location within Washington (state)
- Location: Snohomish / King counties, Washington USA
- Nearest city: Skykomish, Washington
- Coordinates: 47.84623°N 121.40722°W
- Area: 106,577 acres (431.3 km^{2})
- Established: 2008
- Governing body: U.S. Forest Service

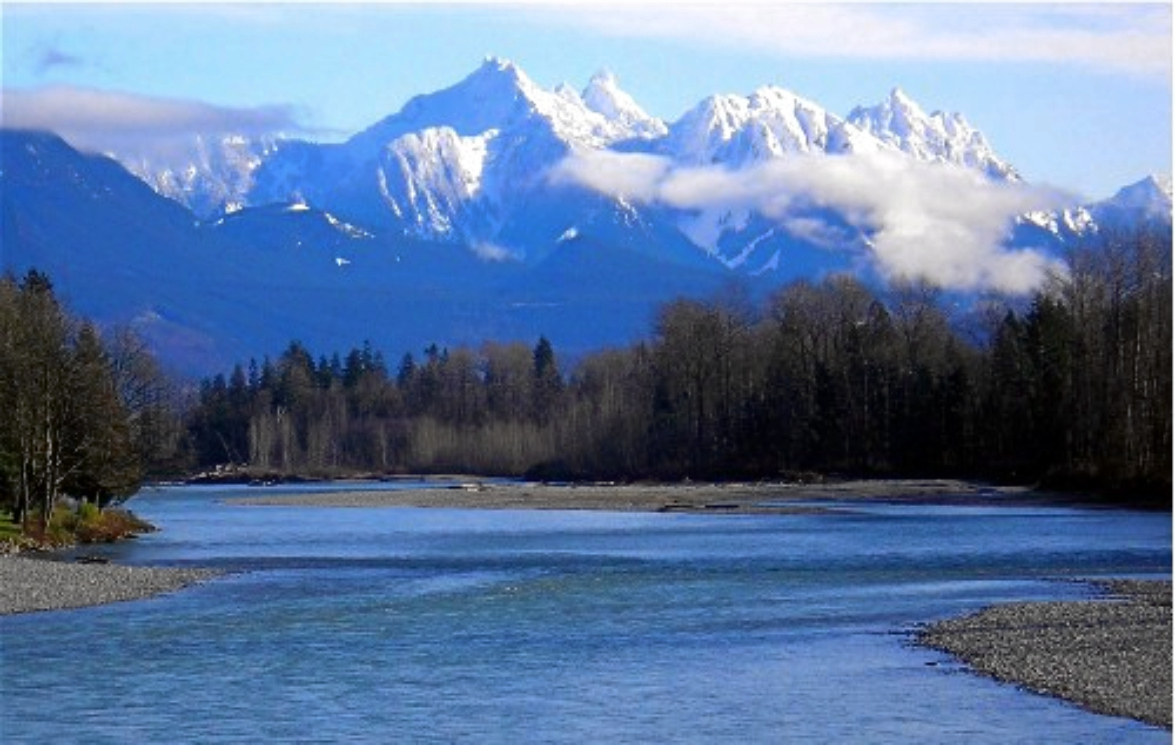
Peaks of the Wild Sky Wilderness

The Wild Sky Wilderness is a 106,577-acre (431 km^{2}) wilderness area in the western Cascade Range of Washington state. The wilderness is within the Mount Baker-Snoqualmie National Forest north of the U.S. Highway 2 towns of Index and Skykomish. The wilderness flanks, but does not include, the North Fork Skykomish River and the Beckler River. The Henry M. Jackson Wilderness is adjacent to the east and northeast. The highest point in Wild Sky Wilderness is 6,244 foot Gunn Peak.

Until 2014 with the expansion of the Alpine Lakes Wilderness by President Obama, the Wild Sky Wilderness was significant because it was the first new federally designated wilderness in Washington since 1984. Also, unlike many other wilderness areas in the Cascades, Wild Sky protects significant amounts of high productivity low-elevation forest.

== Legislative history ==
The Wild Sky Wilderness required several legislative attempts before becoming law, despite broad local support. Prior to 2007, the Wild Sky bill was blocked in committee by Representative Richard Pombo of California, who was not reelected in 2006. President George W. Bush had been receptive to the proposal.

In February 2007, Senator Patty Murray and Rep. Rick Larsen introduced legislation to designate the Wild Sky as wilderness. The bill then passed the House and had been approved by the Senate Energy and Natural Resources Committee. Before the bill came to the Senate floor, however, it was put on hold by Oklahoma Republican Tom Coburn, and never reached a vote.

The Consolidated Natural Resources Act of 2008, creating the Wild Sky Wilderness, was passed by the U.S. Senate on April 10, 2008, and then passed the U.S. House of Representatives a little less than three weeks later on April 29. President Bush signed the Wilderness into law on May 8, 2008.

== Private land ==
When the Wild Sky Wilderness was first proposed, about 2,000 acres (8.1 km^{2}) of private land (inholdings) were within its boundaries. Since 2003 the Wilderness Land Trust and Cascade Land Conservancy have purchased about one-third of this amount. Efforts continue to acquire the remaining inholdings.

In 2023, the Wilderness Land Trust transferred 345 acres (140 ha) near Silvertip Peak into the Wild Sky Wilderness.

== See also ==
- List of U.S. Wilderness Areas
