= Modern paganism and New Age =

Comparison of modern religious movements

Modern paganism and New Age are eclectic new religious movements with similar decentralised structures but differences in their views of history, nature, and goals of the practitioner. Modern pagan movements, which often have roots in 18th- and 19th-century cultural movements, seek to revive or be influenced by historical pagan beliefs. New Age teachings emerged in the second half of the 20th century and are characterised by millenarian ideas about spiritual advancement. Since the counterculture of the 1960s, there has been interaction, mutual influence, and often confusion in the popular mind between the movements.

Among their commonalities, modern pagan and New Age movements have similar relationships between academic study and practice, take interest in aspects of European culture and history that were marginalised before the 20th century, and often incorporate older scholarship in their teachings. Although both movements are diverse and without central dogma, scholars have described major differences in their general tendencies. Whereas modern pagans commonly attribute wisdom to past cultures, New Agers believe in the coming of an improved human consciousness. Modern pagan theology is typically immanent and connects the natural world to the divine, whereas New Age proponents favour transcendence of the physical existence. Modern pagan practices tend to be ceremonial and focus on community, whereas New Age practices are concerned primarily with the personal growth of the individual.

Some hybrids between modern paganism and New Age have emerged, especially in the United States where they tend to overlap and be connected to the same social change movements. The presence of the modern pagan movement Wicca in popular culture since the 1990s has contributed to the creation of individualistic and commercialised hybrid forms focused on witchcraft. Differing views of the natural world and spirituality sometimes create friction between the movements. Modern pagans often seek to distance themselves from New Age identity and sometimes use the term "New Age" as an insult. New Agers commonly criticise modern pagans for their emphasis on material concerns. In the 1990s, several scholars studying New Age movements placed modern paganism under the umbrella of New Age, a classification which has been contested by scholars of modern paganism.

== Definitions ==
=== Modern paganism ===
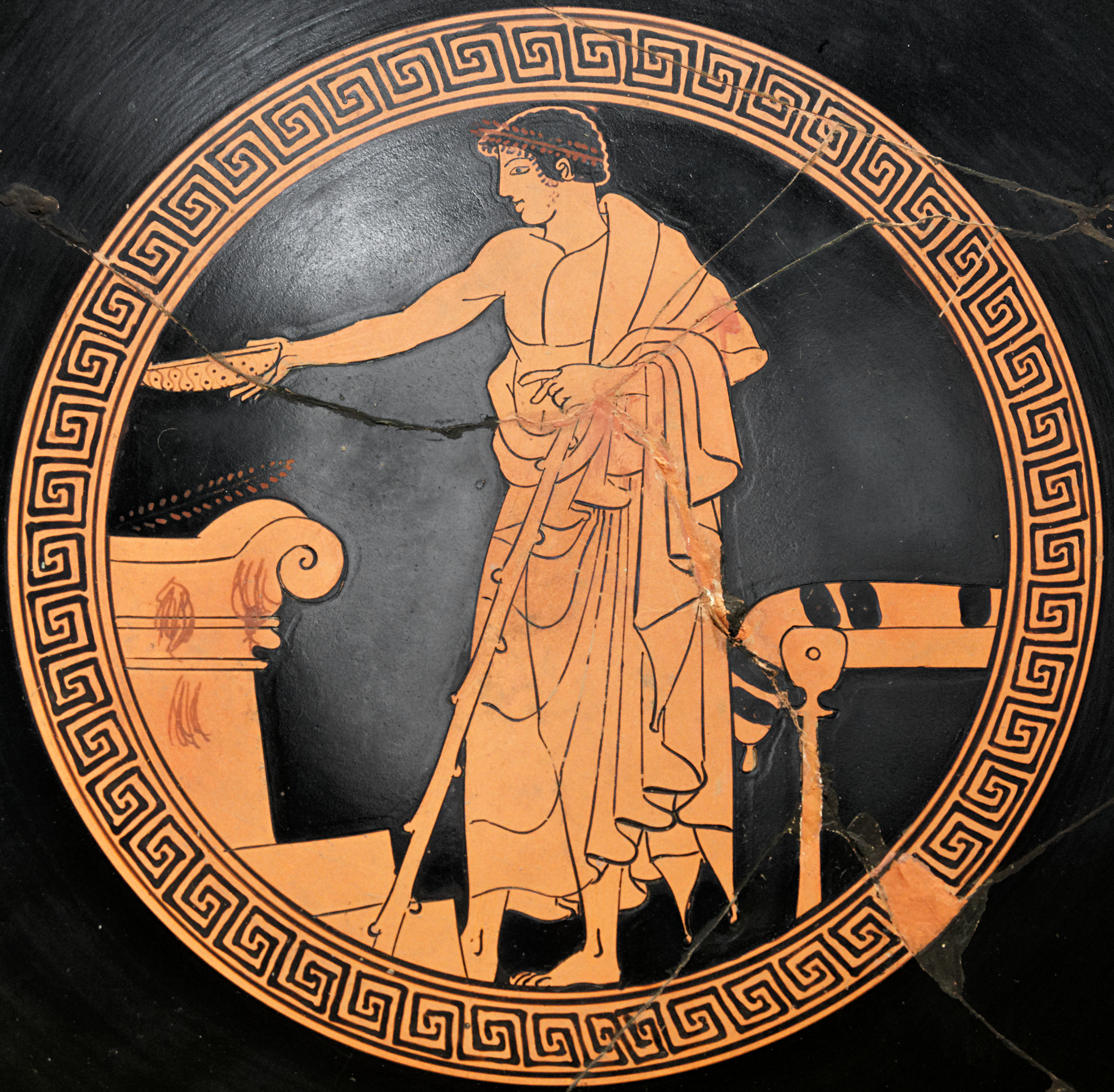
Ancient Christians described other religions as pagan (pictured: libation scene from an Attic cup interior, c. 480 BC).

The word pagan comes from the Latin paganus, which was used by ancient Christian writers, notably Augustine of Hippo, as a religious category that included ancient Greek and ancient Roman religions. (Note: The origin of the word "pagan" in its religious meaning has been debated among scholars for centuries. No consensus exists.) It overlaps with the Germanic-language word heathen which carries on the meaning of the Greek word ethnikós, meaning "of a [foreign] people". Discourses about surviving or returning paganism have existed throughout the modern period and explicit attempts to re-establish pagan religions in Europe have taken place since at least the 15th century. Positive self-identification with the term pagan has frequently been combined with criticism of Christianity and of organised religion in general, and became more common in the 18th and 19th centuries. Many modern pagan new religious movements have roots in the cultural revival and national independence movements of these centuries.

There is no universally accepted definition of modern paganism; it is often understood as distinct from ancient religions, although some scholars have categorised paganism as a generic religious category. (Note: In addition to the diverse interpretations of modern paganism, the terminology and spelling vary among practitioners and scholars alike. Other common names include "Neo-paganism" and "contemporary paganism". The P is sometimes capitalised and sometimes not; some writers use lowercase P for ancient and uppercase P for modern religions. Some scholars prefer to write "paganisms" to reflect the diversity of the field.) The religious studies scholar Michael York advocates the latter approach and says that despite the diverse interpretations of modern paganism, there are general traits that can be summarised as an ideal type. Modern pagans typically attribute wisdom and insight to past cultures, especially those of pre-Christian times. Modern pagan theology is characterised by immanence and thus connects the divine to the natural world. Religious practices vary in origin and execution, but typically revolve around ceremonies and have a focus on community.

=== New Age ===
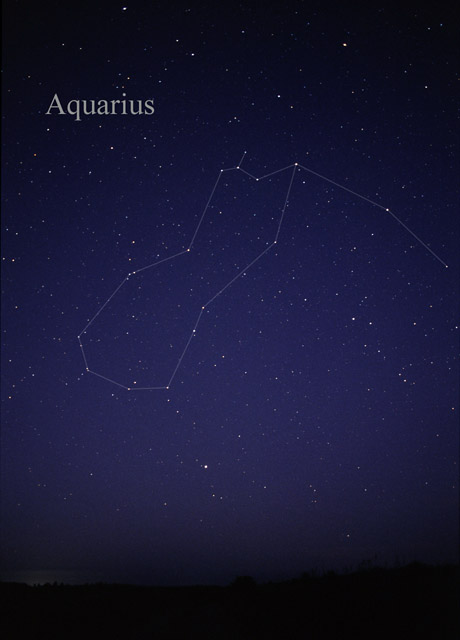
New Age teaches that human consciousness will undergo a significant change, typically coinciding with the Age of Aquarius.

New Age is an umbrella term for an eclectic set of beliefs and techniques that emerged or became more prominent during the counterculture of the 1960s. It receives its name from the idea that human consciousness has changed with the passage of astrological ages, and that the arrival of the Age of Aquarius, which is believed to be the next or current age, will result in a renewal of human spirituality. The term New Age was first used in Theosophical literature and was picked up by post-war UFO religions and other movements that held millenarian beliefs in a coming advancement in human consciousness and understanding. A broader use of the term, based on shared interests, milieus and historical links, became established in the 1970s and 1980s. The main precursors and sources of inspiration to concepts within the New Age movement are Theosophy, New Thought and Carl Jung. Other precursors mentioned by scholars include Joachim of Fiore, transcendentalism, Swedenborgianism and Christian Science. Like several of their precursors, New Agers are often interested in Eastern religions.

Among the basic tendencies of New Age, as described by Wouter Hanegraaff, are the millenarian idea of a new age, the mixing of psychology and religion, evolutionist beliefs in regards to teleology, pedagogy and creativity, a quest for "wholeness" and weak reliance on worldly experiences. New Age teachings generally favour transcendence of the physical existence and de-emphasise material concerns. Adherents often combine and mix practices according to individual needs and interests: they may use techniques such as channeling, visualisation, positive thinking, alternative healing methods and meditation. Some practices are based on a belief that a divine self can be discovered within each individual. General aims are self-growth, physical healing and success in helping people to reach a higher consciousness, both in regards to the individual and to the collective unconscious.

== General commonalities ==
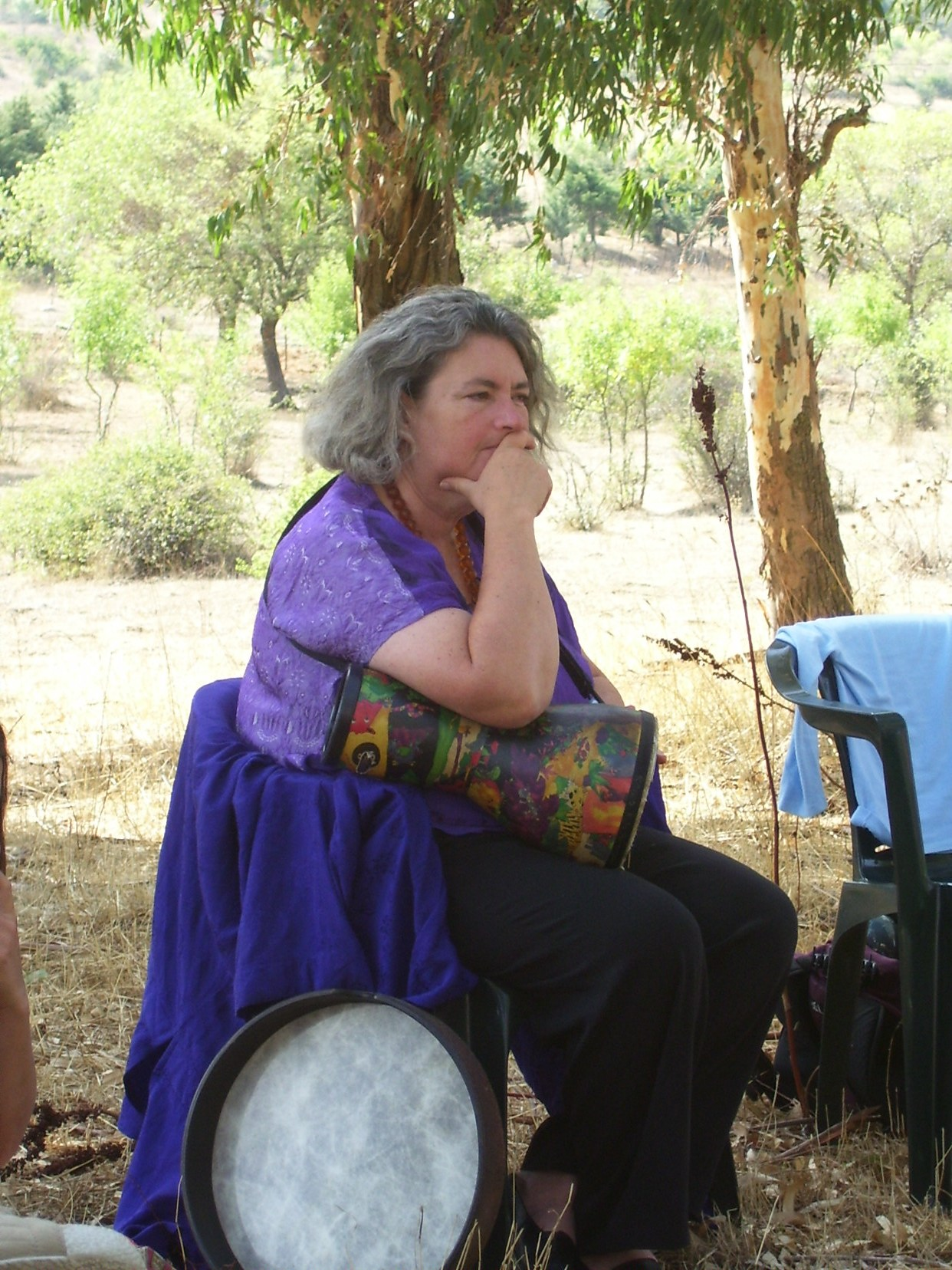
Miriam "Starhawk" Simos has been involved in both Wicca and New Age.

Commonalities between modern paganism and New Age can be found in their shared eclecticism and absence of central authorities and dogma, something that makes them atypical among new religious movements. Instead of being led by a charismatic leader and wanting to separate themselves from their surrounding society, both movements exist through decentralised networks of people, organisations, media projects, events and small communities. They have some terminology in common, tend to value creativity and imagination highly, and adherents may share interests in subjects like Native American and aboriginal cultures, reincarnation or shamanism.

Modern paganism and New Age have similar dynamics between the emic and etic—the perspectives of the practitioner and the outside observer. The religious studies scholar Kocku von Stuckrad attributes this to the second half of the 20th century, when many European and North American intellectuals were sceptical of narratives that held modern Europe as superior and tied European culture to Christian values. This created both academic and popular interest in marginalised and ambiguous parts of European culture, history and identity, which became widespread as the counterculture of the 1960s and 1970s. A complex relationship continues to exist between academic study and practice in modern paganism and New Age. Older scholarship such as the Great Goddess hypothesis and Jung's psychological theories continue to have impact on religious practices, new academic terms are adopted by practitioners, and when scholars use a term that originated in an emic milieu, it might be taken as legitimisation of that term.

== Differences ==
=== Views of history ===
Modern pagans and New Agers typically have contrasting views of history and the future. Modern pagans turn to religious views from the past which they try to revive or, often, to reinvent. Particularly in Europe, modern pagan movements sometimes claim to have an unbroken lineage that can be traced to ancient times. Their view of history is usually based on myths and images derived from past cultures, existing traditions, or nature, and they do not anticipate a future change at a fundamental level. History is regarded as an endless cycle of death and rebirth.

The New Age view of history generally has an evolutionary teleology. New Agers understand history as a progression of significantly different ages and focus on ways to shape the future which they believe will be characterised by a higher consciousness. Instead of seeking to be tradition-bound like modern pagans, New Agers are typically oriented towards an eclectic and new spirituality.

=== Nature and metaphysics ===
Immanent theology often distinguishes modern pagan movements from New Age movements. For modern pagans, the natural world is at the centre of conceptions of the sacred. They generally promote views of completeness where mind–body dualism is absent and the world is regarded as fully functional.

Paul Heelas, York and other scholars say the dominant New Age view is that spiritual truth is more important than material concerns, and this leads to a Manichean dualism where the natural world is viewed as less important, as an obstacle or rejected as an illusion. Heelas says the search for metaphysical perfection and the view that mankind is malfunctioning are defining features of New Age spirituality, which the sociologist Douglas Ezzy, the sociologist Melissa Harrington and the religious studies scholar Joanne Pearson contrast with modern pagan views. Using sociological classifications of world-affirming and world-rejecting religious movements, York says that modern paganism and New Age represent two rival theologies, and that New Agers in particular tend to underestimate the "gnostic–pagan divide", where New Age teachings are part of a gnostic tradition that de-emphasises or negates the body and the physical existence.

=== Practice and practitioner ===
"Generally speaking, whereas we have seen that much in the New Age is explicitly epistemologically individualistic, focusing on enabling the individual to 'go within' and to discover the 'Higher Self', in Paganism there is a greater emphasis on the other, on that which is external to the self: the planet, the deities and the community."

— Religious studies scholar Christopher Partridge

Modern pagan practices can be characterised as striving for long-term continuity, which Pearson contrasts with the focus on reaching specific results that exists in many New Age practices. Among modern pagans, ceremonies are usually central to the religious identity, and seasonal holidays and life passages are ritualised and celebrated in small groups. The ceremonies take different forms depending on the groups that perform them and may involve ancestor veneration or attempts to communicate with spirits. Modern pagans tend to place emphasis on serving a community and many movements in Europe involve ethnic pride and have been connected to nationalism. Although the ethnic dimension is less prevalent in the United States, it is generally viewed as controversial for American modern pagans of European descent to adopt traditions and motifs from non-European cultures.

New Age communities sometimes observe and perform rituals during celestial events, but compared to practitioners of modern paganism, this is inconsistent and less of a defining feature. New Age practices usually take the form of relationships between specialists and clients and often involve meditation. Placing less emphasis on serving a community, the primary focus in New Age teachings is on personal growth, especially the potential for an individual to reach a higher level of consciousness, and the ultimate goal is often to facilitate this shift.

== Overlap and hybrid forms ==
Beyond the ideal types and general tendencies, modern paganism and New Age can exhibit features of each other. New Age materials in particular do not always make a distinction between them. Modern paganism as it exists, according to York, is characterised by confusion between generic and nominal forms, and may incorporate elements of Kabbalism, Freemasonry-derived ceremonial magic, neopythagoreanism and neoplatonism. The religious studies scholar Christopher Partridge describes both movements as parts of the occulture—the spiritual undercurrents of the West—and likens them to two different streams that merge at some points.

Modern pagan movements in the United Kingdom, the United States and Australia have been influenced by ambitions to create individualistic and egalitarian communities, which is less prominent elsewhere in Europe. Especially in the United States, the modern pagan phenomenon largely emerged alongside New Age in the counterculture and youth culture of the baby boom generation, and there is significant overlap between the movements. According to the religious studies scholar Sarah M. Pike, who wrote a monograph about modern paganism and New Age in the United States, the movements share a high degree of religious personalisation and tend towards apocalypticism, and their relationship can be understood through their place in American religious and social history. American modern pagan and New Age communities are often connected to social change movements, promoting sexual liberation, feminism and the post-war American environmental movement. An example of overlap is the annual Starwood Festival, which features modern pagan and New Age activities as parts of a stated goal to be eclectic and inclusive.

Some versions of modern Celtic paganism characterise Celtic identity as peripheral and view the ancient Celts as noble savages. This has led to the creation of Celtic-themed pagan music and modern pagan websites where New Age themes are commonplace. In the 1990s and 2000s, increasing exposure in popular culture of Wicca—a modern pagan movement inspired by Celtic culture and the witch-cult hypothesis—with examples such as the 1996 American film The Craft, led to mutual influence between modern paganism and New Age. It helped to create and popularise a lifestyle-oriented form of Wicca, represented by writers such as Silver RavenWolf and Scott Cunningham, which primarily became popular among teenage girls. Ezzy says this version of Wicca, which he calls "popularised Witchcraft", is heavily influenced by New Age in its individualism and element of commercialism, which he exemplifies with commercial spell books.

The Gaia hypothesis, which was proposed in the 1970s and understands the Earth as a living being, has influenced both modern pagan and New Age practitioners. Among modern pagans, it has had most impact on the Goddess movement, where Gaia is venerated as the earth mother; in New Age, Gaia has been defined as a super-consciousness and a balancing principle. According to York, modern paganism and New Age began to become more similar in the 1990s, as modern pagans more frequently adopted panentheistic views, which combine the beliefs in immanence and transcendence, while New Agers embraced ideas such as holistic science and the Gaia hypothesis, making the movements more receptive to each other's perspectives. A 2001 book review in Publishers Weekly described the views of the American writer Francesca De Grandis as a hybrid of Goddess worship and New Age teachings about self-love, which resulted in "a book on how to worship yourself as a goddess".

== Friction ==
Modern pagans frequently seek to distance themselves from New Age identity and some communities use the term "New Age" as an insult. Their recurring criticism of New Age ethos and practice includes accusations of charging too much money, of thinking in simplistic ways and of engaging in escapism. They reject the common New Age metaphor of a battle between the forces of light and darkness, arguing that darkness represents a necessary part of the natural world which should not be viewed as evil.

New Agers criticise modern pagans for placing too much emphasis on the material world and for lacking a proper spiritual perspective. There has been New Age criticism of how some modern pagans embrace extravagant subcultures, such as adopting dark colour schemes and imagery. People from both movements have accused the other of egocentrism and narcissism.

== Academic disputes over classification ==
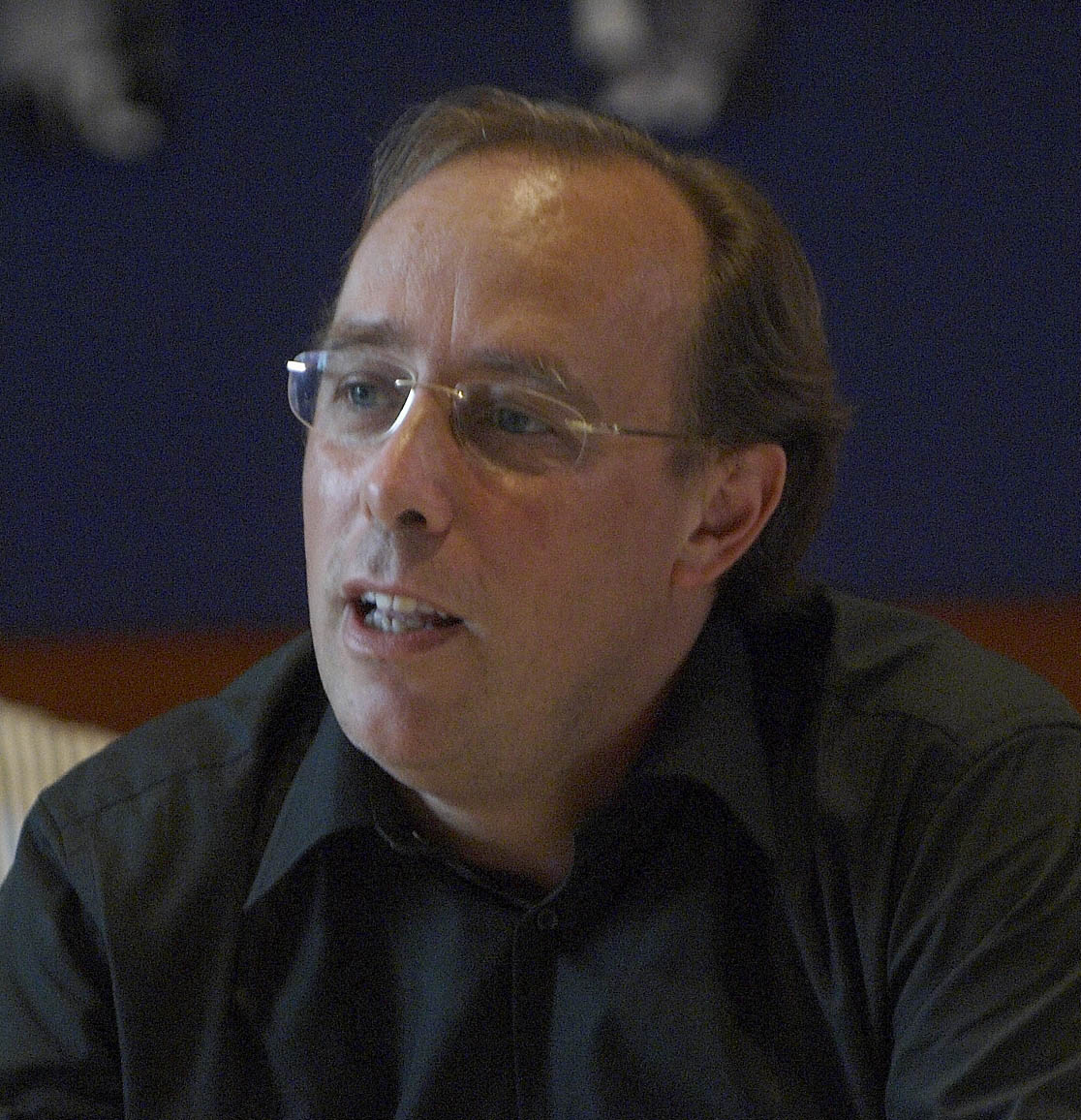
Wouter Hanegraaff places some post-war forms of modern paganism under the New Age umbrella.

Several late 20th-century scholars and religious writers treated modern paganism and the New Age culture as the same phenomenon, or included modern paganism, especially Wicca, under the umbrella of New Age. This was done by some of the leading scholars of the New Age phenomenon, such as Antoine Faivre, Hanegraaff and Heelas. (Note: Melissa Harrington gives examples of books where this is the case: Modern Esoteric Spirituality (1992) edited by Faivre and Jacob Needleman, Access to Western Esotericism (1994) by Faivre, New Age Religion and Western Culture: Esotericism in the Mirror of Secular Thought (1996) by Hanegraaff and The New Age Movement: The Celebration of the Self and the Sacrilization of Modernity (1996) by Heelas. Michael York mentions Lowell Streiker (1990), Peter Spink (1991), Heelas (1996), M. D. Faber (1996) and William Sims Bainbridge (1997).) In his 1996 monograph about New Age, Hanegraaff makes a distinction between older versions of modern paganism and a "New Age variety". In the latter he includes Wicca, especially the forms established in the United States since the 1960s, and the Goddess movement. He addresses a contention made by the American Wiccan Aidan A. Kelly, that modern paganism "parallels the New Age movement in some ways, differs sharply from it in others, and overlaps it in some minor ways"; this argument, according to Hanegraaff, is based on a selective view of New Age and possibly an expression of apologia for modern paganism. Agreeing with York's descriptions of the similarities and differences between the movements, Hanegraaff says their complicated relationship makes modern paganism "a special, relatively clearly circumscribed subculture within [New Age]". Heelas, in his book from 1996, points to the psychological interpretation of theology in New Age teachings, where gods are viewed as projections of the human mind. This results in self-sacralisation, which he also attributes to modern paganism and uses as a basis for its inclusion under the New Age umbrella.

A number of scholars of modern paganism dispute the categorisation of their field under the umbrella of New Age. According to York, several factors may have contributed to the confusion between the movements, such as their shared status as "outsider heresies" in relation to Western mainstream society and Christianity. Other factors include the involvement of the Wiccan Miriam "Starhawk" Simos in organised New Age activities, and modern pagans who in the 1980s adopted the metaphor of a "new age", before distancing themselves from New Age terminology in the 1990s. (Note: For example, Vivianne Crowley published a book in 1989 with the title Wicca: The Old Religion in the New Age. When it was republished in 1996, the title was changed to Wicca: The Old Religion in the New Millennium.) Harrington, who describes herself as a scholar of Wicca, attributes Faivre's and Hanegraaff's categorisation to the breadth of their study of religious subcultures, which creates a false impression of homogeneity. Pearson, whose doctoral dissertation was about Wicca, says a part of the explanation lies in a failure to acknowledge how terminology is used differently depending on the context; for example how the terms "Wicca" and "traditional witchcraft" are understood differently in British and American discussions. (Note: In the United Kingdom, Wicca normally refers to particular initiatory lines, whereas in the United States it may refer to anyone who self-identifies as a witch. "Traditional witchcraft" in the United Kingdom refers to practices that precede Gerald Gardner's Wicca group, whereas in the United States it often refers to the initiatory lines of Gardnerian and Alexandrian Wicca.) Pearson responded to Heelas in 1998 and argued against the view that modern paganism is characterised by self-sacralisation.

Some feminist modern pagans share the New Age goal of finding an inner goddess and may refer to Jungian archetypes. This has led some scholars to classify them as part of the New Age movement, which typically describes gods as creations of the human mind and not as discrete entities. Other scholars view such feminist modern pagans as differing from New Agers because they view the goddess as both internal and external. Ezzy argues that "popularised Witchcraft", which he sets apart from initiatory traditions, should be classified as New Age rather than modern paganism, because it focuses on the self, is not connected to established modern pagan networks, and is integrated with market forces. This view is not universally shared among scholars of modern paganism.

== See also ==
- Gnosticism in modern times
- Jungian interpretation of religion
- Left-hand path and right-hand path
- Neoplatonism and Gnosticism
- New religious movement
- Spiritual but not religious
