= Seax-Wica =

Tradition of the neopagan religion of Wicca

- The founding text of the Seax tradition was The Tree (1974).
- Abbreviation: SW
- Type: Syncretic Wicca
- Orientation: Anglo-Saxon paganism inspired
- Scripture: The Tree: Complete Book of Saxon Witchcraft
- Governance: Priesthood
- Region: United States
- Founder: Raymond Buckland
- Origin: 1973; United States

Seax-Wica, or sometimes Saxon Witchcraft, is a tradition of neopagan practice blending aspects of Wicca with the iconography of Anglo-Saxon paganism, while not seeking to reconstruct the early mediaeval religion itself.

The tradition was founded in 1973 by Raymond Buckland, an English-born high priest of Gardnerian Wicca who had recently moved to the United States. His 1974 book The Tree was written as a definitive guide to Seax-Wica, and subsequently republished in 2005 as Buckland's Book of Saxon Witchcraft.

Seax-Wica, is an orthopraxic, initiatory mystery system grounded in rational immanence and religious magic. It honors the deities of the Germanic pantheon of the Saxon tribe based on their symbolism, it is a modern pagan religion.

== Openness ==
Seax-Wica does not employ any secrecy oath. Buckland's Book of Saxon Witchcraft was written in mind that the reader would already be well versed in the various techniques of Witchcraft and Wiccan ritual. However, Buckland has pointed out that his Complete Book of Witchcraft gives instructions on how to proceed when no tools are available. These instructions are enough to allow one to begin, self-initiate, and consecrate one's first tools.

== History ==
Seax-Wica was founded by Raymond Buckland on August 2, 1973, and introduced to the wider Wiccan and modern Pagan community through the Samhain edition of the newsletter Earth Religion News, published November 1, 1973.

Raymond Buckland had been initiated into the modern pagan witchcraft system founded by Gerald Gardner—known as "The Craft of the Wica/The Craft of the Wise"—and was elevated to the 3rd degree as a High Priest in November 1963 by High Priestess Monique Wilson (Lady Olwen), High Priest Scotty Wilson (Loic), and in the presence of Gerald Gardner in Perth, Scotland. After Gardner's death, his initiates named the path the Gardnerian Wicca Tradition.

In the 1970s, disillusioned by internal power struggles and elitism within some Wiccan branches, Buckland created a new tradition—one more inclusive, accessible, and democratic.

Seax-Wica draws on Gardner's experience and teachings but removes sexual elements, the degree system, and dependence on group structure, emphasizing individuality and freedom of dedication without needing an external initiator. This gave rise to the concept of Self-Dedication or Self-Initiation.

In 1974, Buckland published “The Tree: The Complete Book of Saxon Witchcraft”, which laid out the ritual, philosophical, and organizational foundations of the tradition. According to its introduction, Buckland decided to publish it early after learning that a friend intended to release the material, choosing to safeguard the authenticity of his vision. A 30th anniversary edition titled Buckland's Complete Book of Saxon Witchcraft was released in 2005 with a new introduction—the only addition to the original text.

In November 1975, Buckland began a newsletter issued each Sabbat, known as Seax-Wica Seminary, which offered theoretical insights on Wicca and included various articles. It was titled Seax-Wica Voys and ran for 16 issues, with the final one released in February 1984.

In 1981, Buckland published a Saxon Witchcraft songbook titled Songs of Saxon Witchcraft through Bell, Book and Candle of the Old Dominion (a press run by Mike Shoemaker/Michael Ragan). It was only distributed in the U.S. until the press closed in 1984. Some of these songs later appeared in Buckland's Complete Book of Witchcraft, Wicca for Life, and The Tree.

Buckland did not act as a religious leader but as a guide. His system is based on orthopraxis and mystical progression as an intuitive and experiential journey. As founder, he was honored with the Saxon title Fæder (Father). Websites such as seax-wica.com preserve his legacy, including previously unpublished letters and archival materials.

Buckland's primary objective was to restore the free, sincere, and deeply spiritual spirit of witchcraft, removing secrecy, rigid structures, and power struggles. The tradition allows both solitary and coven practice, promotes self-dedication and self-initiation, and features democratic elections of group leaders who serve for a year and a day. The main deities recognized are Woden and Freya (or Frig, as stated in the 2005 edition's new introduction), representing the God and Goddess in a Germanic-Saxon framework.

As Seax-Wica gained momentum, Buckland's efforts to establish the tradition internationally bore fruit. By the late 1970s and throughout the 1980s, covens formed across the U.S. and abroad, adapting practices to cultural contexts. A milestone occurred in 2017 when the U.S. Department of Defense officially recognized Seax-Wica as a distinct religion, enabling military personnel to express their spirituality in a historically challenging setting.

In addition to The Tree, Seax-Wica's literary body has been enriched by works like Lyblac: Anglo-Saxon Witchcraft, attributed to Wulfage and published by Capall Bann, which explores Saxon magic, rune symbolism, sacred herbs, and Germanic shamanic practices. Considered a symbolic and spiritual—not literalist—supplement, it complements Seax-Wica well. In 2017, Peruvian practitioners introduced the category Seax-Treów, with Buckland's approval, to designate non-initiated devotional practitioners who honor the Saxon gods without assuming priestly roles but may join open celebrations.

== Practice ==
Seax-Wica centers on religious and magical devotion to the Saxon deities, especially Woden and Frig, representing archetypes of the Horned God and Mother Goddess within the Wiccan model. Practitioners may work alone or in democratic covens without fixed hierarchies or mandatory initiation degrees.

Unlike other Wiccan paths requiring formal initiation, Seax-Wica accepts self-dedication as a valid entry point, with detailed steps outlined in The Tree. This allows access for those unable to join a coven due to geography or personal reasons.

Buckland stressed that such dedication was equally valid, stating:

“If at some future date you come into contact with a coven (of the Seax-Wica) then such an Initiation would be duly recognized.” (The Tree)

“Although in any established tradition you have to be initiated into a coven by a High Priest or High Priestess, it is not so in other situations... a Self-Dedication is just fine, and equally as valid as any other Witch’s initiation.” (Wicca for Life, Ch. 3)

Note: This recognition is conditional on sincere adherence to the tradition and not using the term as a shield for personal or ideological deviations.

Covens follow internal democracy. Traditional roles—Priestess, Priest, Thegn (Guardian), and Scribe (Secretary)—are elected for a year and a day. This rotation prevents egotism or power entrenchment, favoring cooperation and service.

Those drawn to Seax-Wica do so through affinity for the deities of the Anglo-Saxon Germanic tribes (primarily Woden and Freya or Frig). The term Wicca here implies priesthood: to be initiated or take oath is to become a priest or priestess of the gods. Devotional followers not assuming priestly roles are called Seax-Treów (Saxon Believers).

Buckland emphasized there is no secrecy oath in Seax-Wica; the system is publicly available for anyone to study and practice. This transparency marked a shift from more closed Wiccan traditions and pioneered inclusion of solitary practitioners, LGBTQ+ members, and those without formal initiatory lineage.

Ritual tools include traditional Wiccan implements like the Seax (ritual knife), candle, drinking horn (chalice), and incense burner, along with Saxon elements such as the ritual spear, the lur (blowing horn), water, salt, and runes—seen as vessels of ancestral power and wisdom. The ritual Circle and Erecting the Temple follow the sunwise (deosil) direction and are rooted in reverence for nature, ancestors, and the Ódic Force.

== Etymology ==
Seax means “Saxon” in Modern English and refers to a dagger used by the Saxon people. Buckland used the word Wica (with one C) in homage to Gerald Gardner's original spelling.

Key Terms

Seax: Ritual dagger or athame

The Tree: Book of Shadows

Lacnunga: Herbal and healing arts

Galdra: Magical chant

Hwata: Divination

The Horn: Replaces the Gardnerian chalice

Gesith: Initiated companion

Ceorl: Seminary student

Treów: Devotional believer

Théow: Sympathizer

Cowan: Non-initiated person

== Philosophy and Principles ==
Seax-Wica is founded on spiritual freedom, reverence for nature, diversity, and personal responsibility. It rejects discrimination based on race, sex, religion, or politics. It emphasizes correct magical and devotional action (orthopraxy) over dogma or secret lineages.

Seax-Wica Manifesto: (i) To worship the God and Goddess of the Old Religion, either as part of a group (Coven) or individually. (ii) To help others learn about that worship. (iii) To combat falsehoods and correct misconceptions about the Craft. (iv) To promote harmony among different Craft traditions. (v) To work toward a better relationship between humans and all aspects of Nature. (vi) To assist members in improving mentally, physically, and spiritually.

== Organisation ==
Seax-Wica allows self-dedication as entry into its tradition, as well as solitary practice. In the Seax tradition, covens work by a form of democracy, electing, un-electing, and re-electing coven officers, the high priest and priestess. Within ritual settings, there are the thegn, a type of sergeant-at-arms/guard/watchman, who can also be responsible for the covenstead (the meeting place of the coven), or guarding a ceremony being performed; there is also a scribe/secretary, who keeps most, if not all, of the coven's records. The word "Thegn", or "Thane" is an Anglo-Saxon title (Anglo-Saxon: þeg(e)n meaning "a servant, one who does service for another.") Allows solitary practice when Buckland's Complete Book of Saxon Witchcraft is followed and contact is maintained with other Seax Gesith

Offers a devotional path (Seax-Treów) without requiring priestly initiation

Buckland was not the head of the tradition, but is respected as its founder, and continued to practice and contribute to it, until his death on September 27, 2017.

== See also ==
- Wicca
- Raymond Buckland
