= Practitioner =

Practitioner may refer to:

- General practitioner
- Nurse practitioner
- Health practitioner
- Insolvency practitioner
- Justice and public safety practitioner
- Legal practitioner
- Medical practitioner
- Mental health professional or practitioner
- Theatre practitioner

Spiritual practitioner

- Christian Science practitioner
- Solitary practitioner in Wicca and Paganism
- Zen practitioner in Buddhism

Other

- The Practitioner, a medical journal
