= Esbat =

Pagan ritual

An esbat /ˈɛsbæt/ is a coven meeting or ritual at a time other than one of the festivals within Wicca and other Wiccan-influenced forms of contemporary Paganism.

Esbats can span a wide range of purposes from coven business meetings and initiation ceremonies to social gatherings, times of merriment, and opportunities to commune with the divine. Janet and Stewart Farrar describe esbats as an opportunity for a "love feast, healing work, psychic training and all."

Esbats are typically held once per month on or near the night of a full moon or new moon. Due to the connection between the Moon and femininity in Wicca, esbats are associated with goddesses.

Esbats are a time set aside for formal worship and have been described as similar to Sundays for Christians or Friday nights for Jewish people. They can be solitary affairs but tend to be conducted in groups. Sources vary on whether these rituals are open to the public or only to initiated members.

== Etymology ==
The term esbat is derived from Old French s'esbattre (Modern French ébat), meaning to frolic and amuse oneself, diversion. It was a borrowing by 20th century anthropologist Margaret Murray's use of French witch trial sources on supposed Witches' Sabbaths in her attempts to "reconstruct" a Witch Cult in Western Europe.

== Observance ==
An esbat is commonly understood to be a ritual observance on the night of a full moon. However, the late high priestess Doreen Valiente distinguished between "full moon Esbat[s]" and other esbatic occasions.

The term esbat in this sense was described by Margaret Murray.

The Esbat differed from the Sabbat by being primarily for business. ... very often the Esbat was for sheer enjoyment only

— Murray, 1921

Esbats vary greatly and can be simple or elaborate. Rituals use symbolism to enhance the properties of a particular moon, of which there are 13 per solar year.

They are typically held at coven members' homes or outdoors. Tools such as candles, athames, incense, pentacles, items from nature, bowls of water, mirrors, and crystals are commonly placed on an altar. The ceremony begins with participants establishing a sacred space by casting a circle or purifying the area by smudging. Then, they commune with the divine, pray, and meditate. Central elements are reflection on changes that have occurred in the past moon cycle, things you wish to change by the next moon, and gratitude. Once the ceremony is completed, a ritual closing is performed. Participants describe esbats as "spiritually fulfilling" and "immensely beneficial to our personal spiritual growth."

=== New Moon ===
When esbat rituals occur during a new moon (also known as a dark moon), it is an occasion to worship the darker aspects of witchcraft. This represents elements that are hidden or in shadow, and is not necessarily associated with evil. New moon esbats may be used to worship a dark or maiden goddess, to banish something unwanted, or to end a phase in life. Because esbats typically occur when the moon is at its highest point, covens may choose for new moon esbats to take place in the mid-afternoon.

=== Full Moon ===
The full moon esbat tends to be a frenetic celebration. Spells for wholeness, children, mothers, families, clairvoyance, and love are performed. Most full moon esbats are held at midnight because the moon is most visible which allows participants to feel closer to it.

One major component of full moon esbats is drawing down the moon. The idea is to draw the essence of the lunar goddess into the body of a coven member, usually a priestess or leader. This is done by another member who channels lunar energy down through a receptacle such as a chalice or knife. The two stand facing each other in the center of the circle and the group asks the goddess to come down. Once the divine energy enters the tool, it is touched to the head, chest, or abdomen of the priestess. Through her body, the goddess speaks to the group by answering questions, giving instructions, offering blessings, or simply "[pouring] her loving energy into the circle and [leading] you in a merry spiral dance." After returning the energy to the goddess, the sign of a pentagram may be used as a dismissal.

The ceremony of cakes and ale is the other main component which typically concludes the full moon esbat. This ritual uses cookies or a loaf of bread and a chalice of wine or other drink which are placed on a central altar. The bread and wine symbolize the body and blood of the mother goddess, who gives life to all things. Each participant takes turns blessing the bread, breaking off a piece, eating it, then passing it clockwise. The same process happens with the chalice. This allows everyone to honor the body and blood of the goddess as they wish.

== See also ==
- Lunar calendar
- Wheel of the Year
- Lunar effect
- List of lunar deities
- Modern paganism
- Uposatha
