= Scott Cunningham =

American writer

- Undated photo of Cunningham
- Born: June 27, 1956; Royal Oak, Michigan, United States
- Died: March 28, 1993 (aged 36)
- Education: San Diego State University
- Occupation: Writer
- Years active: 1980-1993
- Known for: Books on Wicca

Scott Douglas Cunningham (June 27, 1956 – March 28, 1993) was an American writer. Cunningham is the author of several books on Wicca and various other alternative religious subjects.

His work Wicca: A Guide for the Solitary Practitioner, is one of the most successful books on Wicca ever published; he was a friend of notable occultists and Wiccans such as Raymond Buckland, and was a member of the Serpent Stone Family, and received his Third Degree Initiation as a member of that coven.

== Early life ==
Scott Cunningham was born at the William Beaumont Hospital in Royal Oak, Michigan, USA, the second son of prolific author Chester Grant "Chet" Cunningham and Rose Marie Wilhoit Cunningham. The family moved to San Diego, California in the fall of 1959 due to Rose Marie's health problems. The doctors in Royal Oak declared the mild climate in San Diego ideal for her. Outside of many trips to Hawaii, Cunningham lived in San Diego all his life.

Cunningham had one older brother, Greg, and a younger sister, Christine. Scott was openly gay for much of his life.

He studied creative writing at San Diego State University, where he enrolled in 1978. After two years in the program, however, he had more published works than several of his professors and dropped out of the university to write full-time. In the early 1980s Cunningham wrote "more than a dozen novels in various genres from adventure to horror", using pseudonyms, such as "Cathy Cunningham" or "Dirk Fletcher", for his novels. During this period he had as a roommate, magical writer Donald Michael Kraig and often socialized with Neopagan witchcraft writer Raymond Buckland, who was also living in San Diego at the time.

== Wicca ==
In 1980, Cunningham began initiate training under Raven Grimassi and remained as a first-degree initiate until 1982 when he left the tradition to pursue a solo practice of witchcraft.

== Death ==
In 1983, Scott Cunningham was diagnosed with lymphoma, which he successfully overcame. In 1990, while on a speaking tour in Massachusetts, he suddenly fell ill and was diagnosed with AIDS-related cryptococcal meningitis. He suffered from several infections and died in March 1993. He was 36.

== Published works ==
=== Non-Fiction ===
- 1982 – Magical Herbalism: The Secret Craft of the Wise (ISBN 0-87542-120-2)
- 1983 – Earth Power: Techniques of Natural Magic (ISBN 0-87542-121-0)
- 1985 – Cunningham's Encyclopedia of Magical Herbs (ISBN 0-87542-122-9)
- 1987 – The Magical Household: Spells and Rituals for the Home (with David Harrington) (ISBN 0-87542-124-5)
- 1987 – Cunningham's Encyclopedia of Crystal, Gem, and Metal Magic (ISBN 0-87542-126-1)
- 1988 – The Truth About Witchcraft Today (ISBN 0-87542-127-X)
- 1988 – Wicca: A Guide for the Solitary Practitioner (ISBN 0-87542-118-0)
- 1989 – The Complete Book of Incense, Oils & Brews (ISBN 0-87542-128-8)
- 1989 – Magical Aromatherapy: The Power of Scent (ISBN 0-87542-129-6)
- 1991 – Earth, Air, Fire, and Water: More Techniques of Natural Magic (ISBN 0-87542-131-8)
- 1991 – The Magic in Food (ISBN 0-87542-130-X)
- 1993 – Cunningham's Encyclopedia of Wicca in the Kitchen (ISBN 0-7387-0226-9)
- 1993 – Divination For Beginners (ISBN 0-7387-0384-2)
- 1993 – Living Wicca: A Further Guide for the Solitary Practitioner (ISBN 0-87542-184-9)
- 1993 – Spell Crafts: Creating Magical Objects (with David Harrington) (ISBN 0-87542-185-7)
- 1993 – The Truth About Herb Magic (ISBN 0-87542-132-6)
- 1994 – The Truth About Witchcraft (ISBN 0-87542-357-4)
- 1995 – Hawaiian Magic and Spirituality (ISBN 1-56718-199-6)
- 1997 – Pocket Guide to Fortune Telling (ISBN 0-89594-875-3)
- 1999 – Dreaming the Divine: Techniques for Sacred Sleep (ISBN 1-56718-192-9)
- 2009 – Cunningham's Book of Shadows: The Path of An American Traditionalist (ISBN 0-73871-914-5) – A rediscovered manuscript written by Cunningham in the late 1970s or early 1980s.

=== Fiction ===
- 1979 – "Cathy Cunningham", Shadow of Love (ISBN 0-89784-041-0)
- 1980 – The Cliffside Horrors (ISBN 0-89784-085-2)
- 1982 — "Dirk Fletcher", High Plains Temptress [SPUR #1] (ISBN 0-8439-1123-9) [p. 4: "Copyright 1982 by Scott Cunningham"]
- 1987 — "Dirk Fletcher", San Diego Sirens [SPUR #23] (ISBN 0-8439-2519-1) [p. 5: "Special thanks to Scott Cunningham for his contribution to this book"]
- 1990 — "Dirk Fletcher", The Miner's Moll [SPUR #32] (ISBN 0-8439-2992-8) [p. 4: "Special thanks to Scott Cunningham for his contribution to this book"; "Copyright 1990 by Chet Cunningham"]

=== Art by Robin Wood ===
Several of Scott's books include black and white drawings and (in some editions) cover art by the Wiccan artist Robin Wood. Among these books are Magical Herbalism, Earth Power, and Earth, Air, Fire, Water.

=== Videos ===
- Herb Magic (ISBN 0-87542-117-2)

== Film references ==
Never Say Macbeth, a 2007 film, is based around a group of actors who battle the curse of Macbeth by using Scott's book, Wicca: A Guide for the Solitary Practitioner. This film was released on DVD by Vanguard Cinema in August 2008.

== See also ==
- Witch
