= Silver RavenWolf =

American writer

- Born: Jenine E. Trayer; September 11 1956 (age 69)
- Occupation: Writer
- Writing career
- Genre: New Age
- Subjects: Wicca, Paganism
- Website: silverravenwolf.info

Silver RavenWolf (born September 11, 1956) is an American writer on New Age magic, witchcraft and Wicca.

== Career ==
RavenWolf received her Third Degree Initiation from a member of the Serpent Stone family, a pagan congregation. While studying under a British Traditional Witch who claimed to have ties to the International Red Garters in Britain, Silver also became connected with a family lineaged witch who was the last in his line of the tradition. It was this mentorship that prompted the beginning of the Black Forest Circle and Seminary in the 1990s., The Black Forest Circle and Seminary is an organization that contains hundreds of covens spanning the United States and Canada.

Until the 2010s, she appeared as a lecturer and workshop facilitator at events in the Neo-Pagan community. She was active in Wiccan anti-discrimination issues. She was also a Powwower, having adopted the Pennsylvania Dutch practice in a neo-Pagan context.

RavenWolf is the author of over 17 books on Wicca and Paganism in general. She has also written several novels. Currently, her books have been translated into Czech, Spanish, Italian, German, Russian, Hungarian, Dutch and Portuguese. She is the director of the Wiccan/Pagan Press Alliance Midnight Drive.

== Bibliography ==
=== Nonfiction ===
- Hex Craft: Dutch Country Pow-wow Magick (1997) Llewellyn Publications ISBN 978-1-56718-723-6
- TeenWitch!: Wicca for a New Generation (1998) Llewellyn Publications ISBN 978-1-56718-725-0
- American Folk Magick: Charms, Spells & Herbals (1999) Llewellyn Publications ISBN 978-1-56718-720-5
- Halloween: Spells, Recipes & Customs (1999) Llewellyn Publications ISBN 978-1-56718-719-9
- Silver's Spells for Protection (2000) Llewellyn Publications ISBN 978-1-56718-729-8
- Silver's Spells for Love (2001) Llewellyn Publications ISBN 978-1-56718-552-2
- Angels: Companions in Magick (2002) Llewellyn Publications ISBN 978-1-56718-724-3
- Journey of Souls: Case Studies of Life Between Lives by Michael Newton (introduction by Silver Ravenwolf) (2002) Llewellyn Publications ISBN 978-1-56718-485-3
- To Light a Sacred Flame: Practical Witchcraft for the Millennium (2002) Llewellyn Publications ISBN 978-1-56718-721-2
- To Ride a Silver Broomstick: New Generation Witchcraft (2002) Llewellyn Publications ISBN 978-0-87542-791-1
- Witches Runes: Insights from the Old European Magickal Traditions (Cards) (with Nigel Jackson) (2002) Llewellyn Publications ISBN 978-1-56718-553-9
- Solitary Witch: The Ultimate Book of Shadows for the New Generation (2003) Llewellyn Publications ISBN 978-0-7387-0319-0
- Silver's Spells for Abundance (2004) Llewellyn Publications ISBN 978-0-7387-0525-5
- A Witch's Notebook: Lessons in Witchcraft (2005) Llewellyn Publications ISBN 978-0-7387-0662-7
- To Stir a Magick Cauldron: A Witch's Guide to Casting and Conjuring (2005) Llewellyn Publications ISBN 978-1-56718-424-2
- Mindlight: Secrets of Energy, Magick & Manifestation (2006) Llewellyn Publications ISBN 978-0-7387-0985-7
- HedgeWitch: Spells, Crafts & Rituals For Natural Magick (2008) Llewellyn Publications ISBN 978-0-7387-1423-3
- The Witching Hour: Spells, Powders, Formulas, and Witchy Techniques That Work (2017) Llewellyn Publications ISBN 9780738753423
- Poppet Magick: Patterns, Spells & Formulas for Poppets, Spirit Dolls & Magickal Animals (2018) Llewellyn Publications ISBN 9780738756158

=== Novels ===
- Beneath a Mountain Moon (1995) Llewellyn Publications ISBN 978-1-56718-722-9
- Murder at Witches' Bluff: A Novel of Suspense and Magick (2000) Llewellyn Publications ISBN 978-1-56718-727-4

Witches' Chillers series:

- Witches' Night Out (2000) Llewellyn Publications ISBN 978-1-56718-728-1
- Witches' Night of Fear (2001) Llewellyn Publications ISBN 978-1-56718-718-2
- Witches' Key to Terror (2001) Llewellyn Publications ISBN 978-0-7387-0049-6

== See also ==
- Modern paganism and New Age
