= Raymond Buckland =

English writer on the subject of Wicca and the occult

- Born: 31 August 1934; London, England
- Died: 27 September 2017; Ohio, United States
- Occupation: Writer
- Parent(s): Stanley Thomas Buckland, Eileen Lizzie Wells

Raymond Buckland (31 August 1934 – 27 September 2017), whose craft name was Robat, was an English writer on the subject of Wicca and the occult, and a significant figure in the history of Wicca, of which he was a high priest in both the Gardnerian and Seax-Wica traditions.

According to his written works, primarily Witchcraft from the Inside, published in 1971, he was the first person in the United States to openly admit to being a practitioner of Wicca, and he introduced the lineage of Gardnerian Wicca to the United States in 1964, after having been initiated by Gerald Gardner's then-high priestess Monique Wilson in Britain the previous year. He later formed his own tradition dubbed Seax-Wica which focuses on the symbolism of Anglo-Saxon paganism.

== Biography ==
=== Britain: 1934–1962 ===
Buckland was born in London on 31 August 1934, to Eileen and Stanley Buckland. Buckland was of mixed ethnicity; his mother was English, and his father was Romanichal ("English Gypsy"). He was raised in the Anglican Church but developed an interest in Spiritualism and the occult at about age 12, after encountering it from a Spiritualist uncle.

When World War II broke out in 1939, the family moved to Nottingham, where Buckland attended Nottingham High School. It was here that he became involved in amateur dramatic productions.

He went on to be educated at King's College School. In 1955 he married Rosemary Moss. From 1957 to 1959, he served in the Royal Air Force, and then went on to work in a London publishing company for four years, before he and his wife emigrated to the United States in 1962, where they lived on Long Island, New York.

Whilst living in the United States, Buckland worked for British Airways.

=== USA: 1962–2017 ===
In the US, at that time he was head of the Anthropology Department at Columbia University. Buckland soon read the books The Witch-Cult in Western Europe by Margaret Murray and Witchcraft Today by Gerald Gardner, which gave him an insight into Wicca as it is now commonly known. Some sources relay that Buckland had established a relationship with Gardner when he was living on the Isle of Man and running his witchcraft museum; it seems this relationship was by correspondence.

Buckland also met and befriended Margaret St. Clair, author of the occult classic Sign of the Labrys.

Both Buckland and his wife Rosemary travelled to Scotland, where, in Perth, they were initiated into the craft by the High Priestess Monique Wilson (known as the Lady Olwen).

== Coven formed ==
The Bucklands returned home to the United States following their meeting with Gardner, bringing the Gardnerian Book of Shadows with them. They moved to Timberline Drive in Brentwood. That same year they founded a coven in Bay Shore. This was the first group in the US following the Gardnerian Wicca lineage of direct initiation. Many fully initiated Gardnerians in the US can trace their origins back to this coven, which was a centre for Neopaganism in America for twenty years. The Bucklands tried to keep their identities secret at first, due to concern about unwanted and negative attention, however journalist Lisa Hoffman of the New York Sunday News published a news story on them without permission. / Buckland also appeared on the Alan Burke talk show, which is when his neighbors discovered that he practiced Wicca. Once 'outed', Buckland purchased and drove around in a hearse, where he was a familiar sight in the community. When Buckland and his wife separated in 1973, they both left the coven.

=== First Museum of Witchcraft and Magick in the United States, 1968– ===
In 1968 Buckland formed the First Museum of Witchcraft and Magick in the United States, as influenced by Gardner's Museum of Witchcraft and Magick. It started off as a by-appointment-only policy museum in his own basement. After his collection of artifacts grew he moved the museum to a 19th-century house in Bay Shore. The museum received some media attention, and a documentary was produced about it.

In 1973, following his separation from his wife, Buckland moved his museum to Weirs Beach in New Hampshire. In 1978, he moved to Virginia, disbanded the museum, and put all his artifacts in storage.

In 2008, the artifacts of the Museum were housed and entrusted to the care of The Covenant of the Pentacle Wiccan Church (CPWC), based in New Orleans, Louisiana, and led by Arch Priestess Rev. Velvet Rieth. After a period of neglect and mismanagement of the previous curator, Rev. Velvet, along with many members of her church, were able to begin the restoration process.

In 2015, the artifacts were turned over to the Temple of Sacrifice, a coven based in Columbus, Ohio, founded by Raymond Buckland and Kat Tigner. Toni Rotonda, APS of T.O.S., is the museum collections current owner. The Buckland Museum of Witchcraft and Magick is currently being displayed in Cleveland, Ohio.

=== Seax-Wica, 1974–1982 ===
Buckland formed his own Wiccan tradition, Seax-Wica, based upon symbolism taken from Anglo-Saxon paganism. He published everything about the movement in The Tree: Complete Book of Saxon Witchcraft. He then began a correspondence course to teach people about Seax-Wica, which grew to having around a thousand members.

== Personal life ==
Buckland married his first wife, Rosemary, in 1955. They separated in 1973. In 1974 Raymond married Joan Helen Taylor. In 1992 Buckland and his third wife, Tara, moved to a farm in North Central Ohio, where he continued to write, and work as a solitary Wiccan.

His health began failing in 2015, as he suffered first from pneumonia and then a heart attack. After recovering, he experienced more heart and lung problems in late September, 2017, which resulted in his death on 27 September.

== Bibliography ==
In 1969 Buckland published his first book, A Pocket Guide to the Supernatural. He followed this in 1970 with Witchcraft Ancient and Modern and Practical Candleburning Rituals, as well as a novel called Mu Revealed, a spoof on the works of James Churchward, which was written using the pseudonym "Tony Earll" (an anagram for 'not really'). By 1973 he was earning enough money with his books that he could take over running of his museum full-time. Until 2010, he published a book almost every year since, although he shifted largely to fiction in the 21st century.

- A Pocket Guide to the Supernatural. Ace Books, NY. 1975 [1969].
- Practical Candleburning Rituals. Llewellyn Publications, MN. 2000 [1970].
- Witchcraft Ancient and Modern. House of Collectibles, NY. 1970.
- Witchcraft From the Inside: Origins of the Fastest Growing Religious Movement in America. Llewellyn Publications, MN. 1995 [1971].
- pseudonym Tony Earll (1972) [1970]. MU Revealed. Warner Paperback Library, NY.
- with Hereward Carrington (1975). Amazing Secrets of the Psychic World. Parker/Prentice Hall, NJ.
- The Tree: Complete Book of Saxon Witchcraft. Samuel Weiser (Red Wheel/Weiser), ME. 2005 [1974].
- Here is the Occult. House of Collectibles, NY. 2009 [1974].
- The Anatomy of the Occult. Samuel Weiser, ME. 1977.
- The Magick of Chant-O-Matics. Parker/Prentice Hall, NJ. 1980 [1978].
- Practical Color Magick. Llewellyn Publications, MN. 1983.
- Color Magick: Unleash Your Inner Powers. Llewellyn Publications, MN. 2002.
- Buckland's Complete Book of Witchcraft. Llewellyn Publications, MN. 2002 [1986].
- Secrets of Gypsy Fortune Telling. Llewellyn Publications, MN. 1988.
- The Buckland Gypsy Fortunetelling Deck. Llewellyn Publications, MN. 1989. ISBN 0-87542-052-4.
- Secrets of Gypsy Love Magick. Llewellyn Publications, MN. 1990. ISBN 9780875420530.
- Secrets of Gypsy Dream Reading. Llewellyn Publications, MN. 1990.
- Scottish Witchcraft: The History and Magick of the Picts. Llewellyn Publications, MN. 1991.
- with Kathleen Binger (1992). The Book of African Divination. Inner Traditions, VT.
- Doors to Other Worlds. Llewellyn Publications, MN. 1993.
- The Truth About Spirit Communication. Llewellyn Publications, MN. 1995.
- The Committee (novel). Llewellyn Publications, MN. 1993.
- Cardinal's Sin: Psychic Defenders Uncover Evil in the Vatican (novel). Llewellyn Publications, MN. 1996.
- Ray Buckland's Magic Cauldron. Galde Press, MN. 1995.
- Advanced Candle Magick: More Spells and Rituals for Every Purpose. Llewellyn Publications, MN. 1996.
- Witchcraft: Yesterday and Today (video). Llewellyn Publications, MN. 1990.
- Gypsy Witchcraft & Magic. Llewellyn Publications, MN. 1998.
- Gypsy Dream Dictionary. Llewellyn Publications, MN. 1999. ISBN 9781567180909.
- Coin Divination. Llewellyn Publications, MN. 2000. ISBN 9781567180893.
- The Buckland Romani Tarot. Llewellyn Publications, MN. 2001.
- Wicca for Life. Citadel Press, NY. 2001.
- The Witch Book: The Encyclopedia of Witchcraft, Wicca, and Neo-paganism. Visible Ink Press, NY. 2001.
- The Fortune-Telling Book. Visible Ink Press, NY. 2003. ISBN 9780780807204.
- Signs, Symbols & Omens: An Illustrated Guide to Magical & Spiritual Symbolism. Llewellyn Publications, MN. 2003.
- Cards of Alchemy. Llewellyn Publications, MN. 2003.
- Wicca for One. Citadel Press, NY. 2004.
- Buckland's Book of Spirit Communications. Llewellyn Publications, MN. 2004.
- The Spirit Book: The Encyclopedia of Clairvoyance, Channeling, and Spirit Communication. Visible Ink Press, NY. 2005.
- Mediumship and Spirit Communication. Buckland Books. 2005.
- Face to Face with God?. Buckland Books. 2006.
- Ouija - "Yes! Yes!". Doorway Publications. 2006.
- Death, Where is Thy Sting?. Buckland Books. 2006.
- Dragons, Shamans & Spiritualists. Buckland Books. 2007.
- Buckland's Doorway to Candle Magic. Buckland Books. 2007.
- the Torque of Kernow (novel). Galde Press/Buckland Books. 2008.
- The Weiser's Field Guide to Ghosts. Red Wheel/Weiser. 2009.
- Buckland's Book of Gypsy Magic. Red Wheel/Weiser. 2010.
- Solitary Séance: How You Can Talk with Spirits on Your Own. Llewellyn Publications, MN. 2011.
