= History of Wicca =

History of the neopagan religion

The history of Wicca documents the rise of the Neopagan religion of Wicca and related witchcraft-based Neopagan religions. (Note: The definition of which witchcraft-based Neopagan groups can be considered to be forms of "Wicca" is debatable.) Wicca originated in the early 20th century, when it developed amongst secretive covens in England who were basing their religious beliefs and practices upon what they read of the historical witch-cult in the works of such writers as Margaret Murray. It was subsequently founded in the 1950s by Gardner, who claimed to have been initiated into the Craft – as Wicca is often known – by the New Forest coven in 1939. Gardner's form of Wicca, the Gardnerian tradition, was spread by both him and his followers like the High Priestesses Doreen Valiente, Patricia Crowther and Eleanor Bone into other parts of the British Isles, and also into other, predominantly English-speaking, countries across the world. In the 1960s, new figures arose in Britain who popularized their own forms of the religion, including Robert Cochrane, Sybil Leek and Alex Sanders, and organizations began to be formed to propagate it, such as the Witchcraft Research Association. It was during this decade that the faith was transported to the United States, where it was further adapted into new traditions such as Feri, 1734 and Dianic Wicca in the ensuing decades, and where organizations such as the Covenant of the Goddess were formed.

From the 1970s onward, books began to be published by such figures as Paul Huson, Scott Cunningham, and Stewart and Janet Farrar which encouraged self-initiation into the Craft, leading to a boost in the number of adherents and the development of traditions. With the rising popularity of Wicca, it was used as a partial basis for witchcraft-based American films and television shows, further increasing its profile, particularly amongst younger people, in the 1990s.

Since the early 1990s, historians have published studies and research into the history of Wicca, including the American Aidan Kelly and the Britons Ronald Hutton and Philip Heselton.

== Background ==
=== Early modern witch trials ===
During the 16th and 17th centuries, a widespread moral panic took place across Europe and the American colonies. The social and political turmoil following periods of widespread crop failure, war, and disease, led to numerous men and women being accused of practicing malevolent witchcraft, which resulted in the witch trials in the early modern period. The accused were put on trial and alleged to be witches who worshiped the Devil and committed acts of diabolism that included the cannibalism of children and desecration of the Eucharist. Between 40,000 and 60,000 people were executed for witchcraft during this period.

Most scholars agree that the witch trials were the result of isolated incidents of hysteria in remote peasant communities. While many of the accused confessed to various acts of magic and Satanism, all did so under threat of torture, and historians agree that there is no evidence any of the victims of the trials were practicing any real magic or any non-Christian religious or magical practices.

=== Witch-cult hypothesis ===
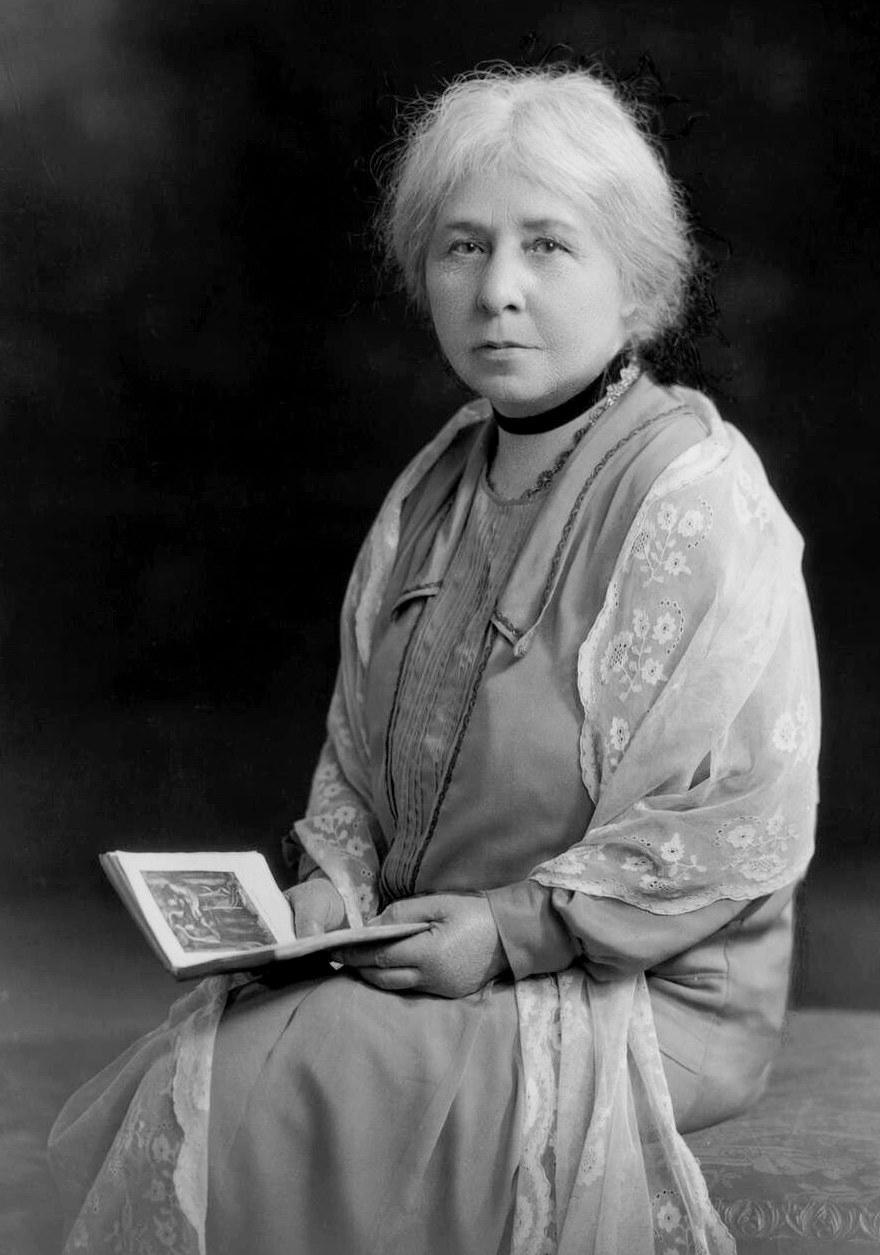
Portrait of Margaret Murray, 1928.

A discredited explanation for the early modern witch trials, known as the witch-cult hypothesis, was proposed by the German Professor Karl Ernst Jarcke in 1828. Jarcke's hypothesis claimed that the victims of the early modern witch trials were not innocents caught up in a moral panic, but members of a previously unknown pan-European pagan religion which had pre-dated Christianity, been persecuted by the Christian Church as a rival religion, and finally driven underground, where it had survived in secret until being revealed in the confessions of those accused in the witch trials. This idea was later endorsed by German historian Franz Josef Mone and French historian Jules Michelet. In the late 19th century, variations on this hypothesis were adopted by two Americans, Matilda Joslyn Gage and Charles Leland, the latter of whom promoted it in his 1899 book Aradia, or the Gospel of the Witches.

The witch-cult hypothesis' most prominent and influential advocate was the English Egyptologist Margaret Murray, who promoted it in a series of books – most notably 1921's The Witch-Cult in Western Europe and 1933's The God of the Witches. Murray's books were the sources of many well-known motifs which have often been incorporated into Wicca. The idea that covens should have 13 members was developed by Murray, based on a single witness statement from one of the witch trials, as was her assertion that covens met on the cross-quarter days four times per year.

Murray was very interested in ascribing naturalistic or religious ceremonial explanations to some of the more fantastic descriptions found in witch trial testimony. Murray suggested, based in part on the work of James Frazer in The Golden Bough, that the witches accused in the early modern trials were not in fact Satanists, but worshiped a pre-Christian god associated with forests and the natural world. Murray identified this god as Janus (or Dianus, following Frazer's suggested etymology), who she described as a "Horned God" of the wilds in order to explain descriptions of a horned Satan provided by witch trial confessions. Because those accused of witchcraft often described witches meetings as involving sexual orgies with Satan, she suggested that a male priest representing Dianus would have been present at each coven meeting, dressed in horns and animals skins, who engaged in sexual acts with the gathered women. Murray further interpreted descriptions of sexual intercourse with Satan as being cold and painful to mean that the priest would often use artificial implements on the witches when he became too exhausted to continue. Unlike most modern forms of religious witchcraft, Murray's conception of the witch-cult was therefore strictly patriarchal. In her hypothesis, witches worshiped a single god, and though a female figure in a role known as "the Maiden" would be present at coven gatherings, Murray did not consider her to represent a goddess. In this way, Murray's hypothesis, which had been based primarily of her interpretations of witch trial records, differed strongly from Leland's belief in a goddess-centered witch-cult focused on Diana and Aradia, derived from supposed rural Italian folk practices.

==== Benevolent witchcraft ====
One key aspect of Murray's witch-cult hypothesis, later adopted by Wicca, was the idea that not only were historical accounts of witches based in truth, but witches had originally been involved in benevolent fertility-related functions rather than malevolent hexing and cursing as traditionally portrayed. In examining testimony from the early modern witch trials, Murray encountered numerous examples of the kinds of curses and nefarious activities the accused people confessed to. Seeking to fit these into a framework in which descriptions of witchcraft had both a natural and pagan-religious explanation, Murray posited that these malevolent actions were actually twisted interpretations of benevolent actions, altered either under duress during the trials, or by practitioners themselves who had, over the years, forgotten or changed the "original" intent of their practices. For example, Murray interpreted Isobel Gowdie's confession to cursing a farm field by setting loose a toad pulling a miniature plough as originally having been not a curse on the field as Gowdie stated, but a means of ensuring fertility of the crops. Murray stated that these acts were "misunderstood by the recorders and probably by the witches themselves".

According to Murray:

For centuries both before and after the Christian era, the witch was both honoured and loved. Whether man or woman, the witch was consulted by all, for relief in sickness, for counsel in trouble, or for foreknowledge of forthcoming events. They were at home in the courts of Kings [...] their mystical powers gave them the authority for discovering culprits, who then received the appropriate punishment.

— Murray 1933, pp. 110-11.

With these kinds of interpretations, Murray created for the first time the idea of the witch as a practitioner of good magic and religious rites to ensure fertility of people and the land. This ran counter to all previous ideas about what witchcraft was in history and folklore – even Leland's variant of the witch-cult hypothesis in Aradia depicted witches as not fully benevolent, but rather as revolutionary figures who would use cursing and black magic to exact revenge on their enemies, the upper classes, and the Catholic Church.

==== Covens and Sabbaths ====
Murray combined testimony from several witch trials to arrive at the idea that witches met four times per year at coven meetings or "Sabbaths". She also used one piece of testimony to arrive at the conclusion that covens were usually composed of 13 witches, led by a male priest who would dress in animal skins, horns, and fork-toed shoes to denote his authority (the dress was assumed to be a naturalistic explanation for accused witch's descriptions of Satan). The "Grand Master", according to Murray, not only represented the Horned God but was believed to fully embody him, allowing his presence at the Sabbath. She wrote:

This was undoubtedly the appeal of the Old Religion: the God was there present with his worshippers, they could see him, they could speak with him as friend to friend, whereas the Christian God was unseen and far away in Heaven.

— Murray 1933, p. 90.

According to Murray, the traditional name for coven gatherings, "Sabbath", was derived from s'esbattre, meaning "to frolic". Most historians disagree, arguing instead that the organizers of the witch trials adopted terms predominantly associated with Judaism, including "Sabbath", in order to denigrate witches as the equivalent to Jews, who were also highly denigrated in mainstream European culture during this period. In fact, many witch trial accounts used not only "Sabbath" but also "synagogue" in reference to gatherings of witches.

==== Criticism ====
Most mainstream folklorists, including most of Murray's contemporaries, did not take her hypothesis seriously. Rather than accept Murray's naturalistic explanation for the magical feats and rituals ascribed to witches during the early modern trials, other folklorists argued that the entire scenario was always fictitious and did not require a naturalistic explanation. The supposed details of the rituals and witchcraft practices described in trial records were simply invented by victims under torture or threat of torture, based on the kinds of diabolic rites that clergy of the time would have expected to hear about. Almost all of Murray's peers regarded the witch-cult theory as incorrect and based on poor scholarship. Modern scholars have notes that Murray was highly selective in the evidence she pulled from trial accounts, favoring details that supported her theory and ignoring details that clearly had no naturalistic analogue. Murray often contradicted herself within her own books, citing accounts in one chapter as evidence for naturalistic explanations while using exactly the same passages to argue opposite points in the next.

Despite these criticisms, Murray was invited to write the entry on "witchcraft" for the 1929 edition of the Encyclopædia Britannica, which was reprinted for decades, last appearing in the 1969 edition. Rather than write an article that reflected the historical consensus on the witch trials, Murray used the opportunity to promote her own hypothesis in the Encyclopædia, presenting it as fact. It was so influential that, according to folklorist Jacqueline Simpson, Murray's ideas became "so entrenched in popular culture that they will probably never be uprooted."

Though most late 20th and early 21st century historians have been critical of Murray's ideas and methods, a few credit her hypothesis with least a bit of underlying truth. Emmanuel Le Roy Ladurie, for example, argued that while most of Murray's arguments were "near nonsense", he also pointed to Carlo Ginzburg's discovery in the 1960s of the Italian benandanti, folk magicians who practiced anti-witchcraft magic and were themselves put on trial for witchcraft, as evidence that in at least some cases, the accusations of the witch trial organizers were not based entirely on panicked fantasy. Ginzburg himself distanced himself from Murray's hypothesis, though he also argued that the benandanti were a continuation of a pre-Christian shamanic tradition, an assertion which has itself been criticized by other scholars as lacking solid evidence.

==== Adoption by Gerald Gardner ====
Simpson noted that the only contemporary member of the Folklore Society who took Murray's ideas seriously was Gerald Gardner, who used them as the basis for Wicca. The witch-cult theory came to represent "the historical narrative around which Wicca built itself", with early Wiccans claiming to be members of Murray's hypothesized secret religion. Many Wiccans, particularly those of the early decades, believed that their religion was a continuation of the witch-cult. It was only during the 1980s and 1990s that some Wiccans began to see the idea of the witch-cult as a creation myth rather than as historical fact. For instance, in 1998, Wiccan Jenny Gibbons stated that:

We Neopagans now face a crisis. As new data appeared, historians altered their theories to account for it. We have not. Therefore an enormous gap has opened between the academic and the "average" Pagan view of witchcraft. We continue to use of out-dated and poor writers, like Margaret Murray, Montague Summers, Gerald Gardner, and Jules Michelet. We avoid the somewhat dull academic texts that present solid research, preferring sensational writers who play to our emotions. For example, I have never seen a copy of Brian Levack's The Witch Hunt in Early Modern Europe in a Pagan bookstore. Yet half the stores I visit carry Anne Llewellyn Barstow's Witchcraze, a deeply flawed book which has been ignored or reviled by most scholarly historians. We owe it to ourselves to study the Great Hunt more honestly, in more detail, and using the best data available. Dualistic fairy tales of noble witches and evil witch-hunters have great emotional appeal, but they blind us to what happened. And what could happen, today. Few Pagans commented on the haunting similarities between the Great Hunt and America's panic over Satanic cults. Scholars noticed it; we didn't. We say 'Never again the Burning!' But if we don't know what happened the first time, how are we ever going to prevent it from happening again?"

— Jenny Gibbons, Studying the Great European Witch Hunt

=== Ancient matriarchy hypothesis ===
Another hypothesis that would have major influence on Wicca during its development was the idea of primitive matriarchal religions, which derived from the work of the Swiss lawyer Johann Jakob Bachofen, was popular in Gardner's day, both among academics (e.g., Erich Neumann, Margaret Murray) and amateurs (e.g. Robert Graves). Later scholars (e.g. Carl Jung and Marija Gimbutas) continued research in this area, and later still Joseph Campbell, Ashley Montagu and others became admirers of Gimbutas' theories of matriarchies in ancient Europe. Matriarchal interpretations of the archaeological record and the criticism of such work continue to be matters of academic debate. Some academics carry on research in this area (such as the 2003 World Congress on Matriarchal Studies). Critics argue that such matriarchal societies never actually existed and are an invention of researchers such as Margaret Murray. This is disputed by documentaries such as Blossoms of Fire (about contemporary Zapotec society).

The idea of a supreme Mother Goddess was common in Victorian and Edwardian literature: the concept of a Horned God – especially related to the gods Pan or Faunus – was less common, but still significant. Both of these ideas were widely accepted in academic literature and the popular press at the time.

== The New Forest coven ==
In 1954, Gerald Gardner, a retired English civil servant who had spent most of his life in the far east, and who was a member of The Folklore Society during Margaret Murray's tenure, published Witchcraft Today, in which he made the claim to have encountered surviving members of Murray's hypothesized early modern witch-cult. Gardner claimed that he had been initiated into a practicing coven of the cult in September 1939, a group that has become known as the New Forest coven. Gardner claimed that this group had met in the New Forest in southern England, and that he had met some of their members initially through the Rosicrucian Order Crotona Fellowship. He mentioned two of their members, a local worthy called "Old Dorothy", in whose house he claimed to have been initiated, and "Dafo", who became a friend of his and would remain so for many years.

Doreen Valiente undertook research into the identity of "Old Dorothy", whose surname was Clutterbuck. She refuted the claims of those who had suggested that Dorothy had been the product of Gardner's imagination. More recently, it has been doubted (notably by Ronald Hutton) whether the historical Dorothy Clutterbuck, who was outwardly an observant Christian and a pillar of the local community, really was involved in occult activities. In Hutton's view, Gardner may have used her name as a joke and/or as a subterfuge to conceal the identity of Dafo or some other individual. Valiente also assumed that Clutterbuck was the same individual as Dafo. Dafo herself seems to have been a teacher of music and elocution by the name of Edith Woodford-Grimes, and there have been persistent suggestions that she and Gardner were lovers.

=== Possible origins ===
==== Early 20th-century revival ====
Some, such as Isaac Bonewits, have argued that Valiente and Heselton's evidence points to an early 20th-century revival predating Gardner (by the New Forest Coven, perhaps), rather than an intact old Pagan religion. The argument points to historical claims of Gardner's that agree with scholarship of a certain time period and contradict later scholarship. Bonewits writes, "Somewhere between 1920 and 1925 in England some folklorists appear to have gotten together with some Golden Dawn Rosicrucians and a few supposed Fam-Trads to produce the first modern covens in England; grabbing eclectically from any source they could find in order to try and reconstruct the shards of their Pagan past."

==== Order of Woodcraft Chivalry ====
It has been proposed, originally in the Druidic journal Aisling that Gardner's New Forest coven was the pagan section of the Order of Woodcraft Chivalry; this order performed rituals in the New Forest in the early 1920s and its pagan section honoured a moon goddess and a horned god, and believed in ritual nakedness. One of Ronald Hutton's informants reports that Gardner was familiar with this order at least by the 1950s. A major difficulty with identifying this group with the New Forest coven is that it does not appear to have met in the New Forest between 1934 and 1945. Gardner records a working by the coven in the New Forest in 1940 against the projected Nazi invasion.

==== George Pickingill's coven ====
A theory advanced by Bill Liddell is that the New Forest coven derived from a set of covens created by the nineteenth century cunning man George Pickingill, who lived in the Essex village of Canewdon. This claim is not widely accepted, although it does focus attention on the well documented and widespread "cunning folk" and their contribution to the history of British witchcraft.

== Gardnerian Wicca and the Bricket Wood coven (1946–1963) ==
The witches' cottage, located on the grounds of Fiveacres nudist club, where the Bricket Wood coven met.

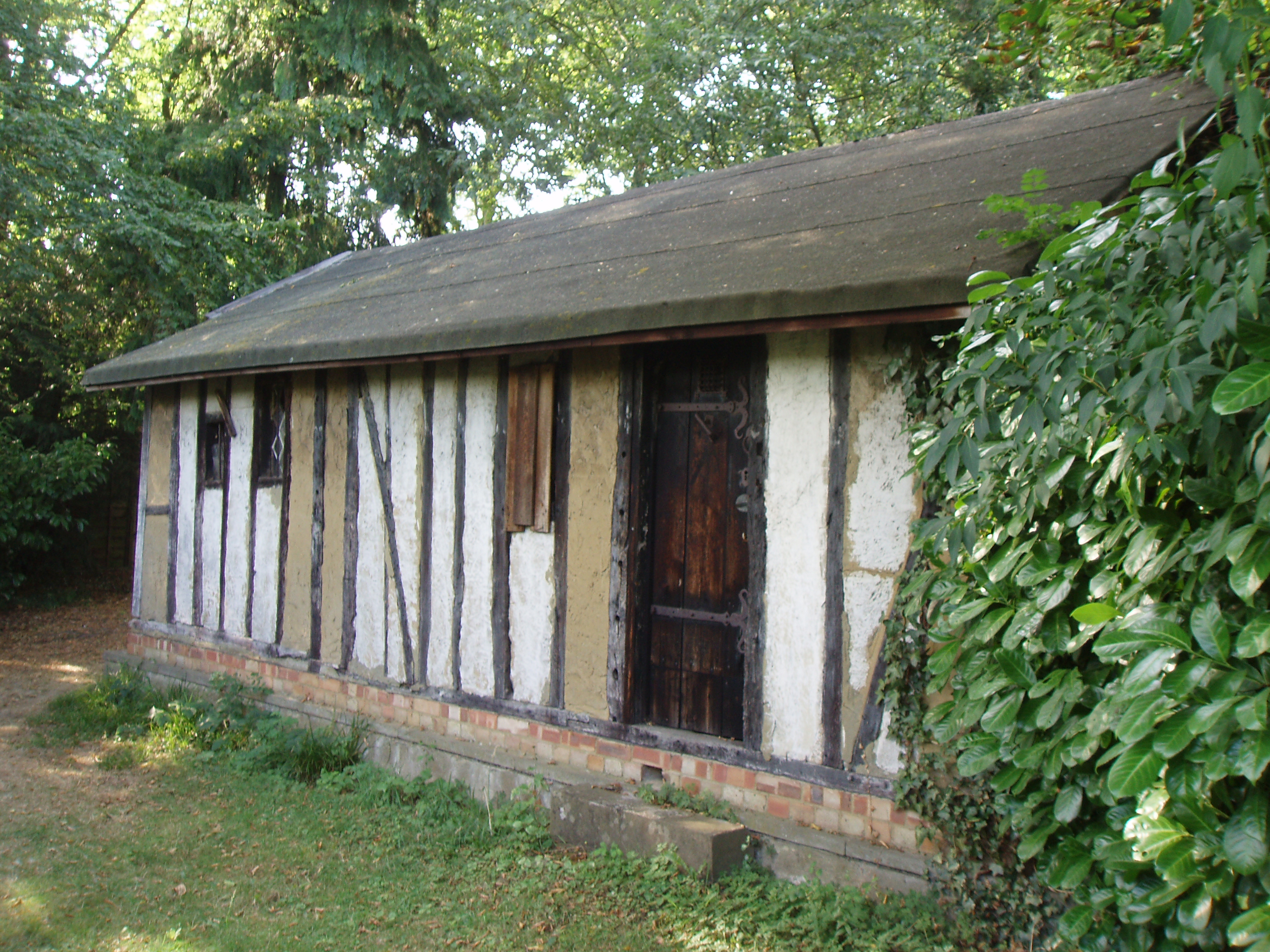
The witches' cottage in 2006.

Gardner, claiming to be fearful that the witch religion would die out, began to propagate it by forming the Bricket Wood coven in Hertfordshire circa 1946. He acted as the High Priest for the coven, and Edith Woodford-Grimes (a.k.a. "Dafo"), who also claimed to have been a member of the New Forest coven, acted as his High Priestess. However, Woodford-Grimes became concerned that Gardner's attempts to gain publicity would lead to a public backlash against her, and so she left the Bricket Wood coven in 1952.

In 1953, Gardner initiated a young woman named Doreen Valiente into the coven, and she soon went on to become the new High Priestess. Around the same time, Gardner composed the coven's Book of Shadows, a workbook of rituals, although he claimed it was of ancient origins. Valiente's influence on the developing religion was immediately felt. Gardner's early conception of religious witchcraft closely paralleled the system outlined by Margaret Murray, including a patriarchal structure which focused almost exclusively on the worship of Murray's "Horned God". However, under the influence of Valiente, emphasis soon shifted to emphasize the role of the goddess, bringing Gardner's witchcraft in line with pre-Murray sources like Charles Leland's Aradia. Gardner was also reportedly upset when Valiente recognized that significant portions of his rituals had been adapted with very little change from those developed in Aleister Crowley's tradition of Thelema. Gardner asserted that he had simply used Crowley's rituals to fill in the rather bare bones rituals he had been given by the New Forest coven. Nonetheless, Valiente helped Gardner rewrite the Book of Shadows, removing much of what she saw as "Crowleyanity", and adding sections such as the Charge of the Goddess, which she adapted from Aradia in poetic verse. Valiente and Gardner later had a falling out when she became frustrated with his repeated attempts to gain publicity for the coven, and when he tried to impose the so-called "Wiccan Laws", something which he claimed were used by the witch-cult but which Valiente believed he had simply made up. She left, along with several other members of the Bricket Wood coven, to found their own. The Bricket Wood coven continued on with members that included Jack Bracelin, Dayonis, Frederic Lamond and Lois Bourne.

Gardner also propagated his witchcraft tradition, which came to be referred to as "Gardnerian" witchcraft, outside of his Bricket Wood coven. He initiated Patricia Crowther, Eleanor Rae Bone and Monique Wilson, all of whom went on to propagate Gardnerian Witchcraft through their own covens. Various other initiates began to spread the craft around Britain, for instance Charles Clark took the religion to England's northern neighbour, Scotland.

Gardner eventually succeeded in gaining greater publicity for his religion. He gave interviews to several newspapers, some of which were positive, although others turned very negative, one even declaring "Witches Devil-Worship in London!". He also published a second non-fiction book on the subject, The Meaning of Witchcraft, in 1959, as well as running the Museum of Magic and Witchcraft on the Isle of Man up until his death in 1964.

Gardner referred to members of his tradition as "the Wica", although he called the religion itself "Witchcraft", and never used the term "Wicca" in the sense as it is now known.

=== Gardner's sources ===
The ritual format of Wicca shows the influence of late Victorian era occultism (even co-founder Doreen Valiente admitted seeing influence from Aleister Crowley), and there is very little in the ritual that cannot be shown to have come from earlier extant sources. The religion's spiritual content, however, is inspired by older Pagan faiths (for example, in the veneration of historical pagan deities), with Buddhist and Hindu influences (e.g. in the Wiccan doctrine of reincarnation).

It has been posited by authors such as Aidan Kelly and Francis X. King that Gardner himself created the religion that he claimed to have discovered, rewriting the rituals of an older witchcraft tradition according to his own whim, (Note: Kelly believed that the New Forest coven's rituals were identical with those of Rhiannon Ryall before Gardner rewrote them (Crafting the Art of Magic p. 41-2); King states "Louis Wilkinson went on to tell me various interesting details of the practices of these Hampshire witches – details which, I felt sure, made it certain that the group was not simply derived from the jaded tastes of middle-class intellectuals who adhered to the theories of Margaret Murray" (The Rites of Modern Occult Magic p. 178).) and incorporating elements from the thesis of Margaret Murray, sources such as Aradia, or the Gospel of the Witches by Charles Godfrey Leland and the practices of ceremonial magic.

The original material in the rituals brought to light by Gardner is not cohesive, and mostly takes the form of substitutions or expansions within unoriginal material. Roger Dearnaley, in An Annotated Chronology and Bibliography of the Early Gardnerian Craft, describes it as a "patchwork". One element that is apparently distinctive is the use of ritual scourging and binding as a method of attaining an ecstatic trance for magical working. Hutton argues strongly that this practice in Wicca does not reflect sado-masochistic sexuality (he refers in this connection to Gardner's own collection of very mild, quasi-pornographic material, which showed no traces of such interests), but is simply a practical method of work alternative to drugs or other more strenuous methods.

Heselton, writing in Wiccan Roots and later in Gerald Gardner and the Cauldron of Inspiration, argues that Gardner was not the author of the Wiccan rituals but received them in good faith from an unknown source. (Doreen Valiente makes this claim regarding the "basic skeleton of the rituals," as Margot Adler puts it in Drawing Down the Moon.) He notes that all the Crowley material that is found in the Wiccan rituals can be found in a single book, The Equinox vol 3 no. 1 or Blue Equinox (1919). Gardner is not known to have owned or had access to a copy of this book, although he met with Crowley towards the end of the latter's life. Gardner admitted that "the rituals he received from Old Dorothy's coven were very fragmentary, and in order to make them workable, he had to supplement them with other material."

== Development of Wicca ==
=== Hereditary witchcraft (1950s) ===
Gardner was not the only person claiming to be a member of a surviving remnant of the witch-cult; several others also emerged in the 1950s making this claim. They included Sybil Leek, Charles Cardell, Raymond Howard, Rolla Nordic and Robert Cochrane. They claimed to have been initiated into the cult by their ancestors, and described themselves as following "Hereditary" or "Traditional" forms of Witchcraft, whereas Gardner, some said, was propagating a modern, and invalid form. Their beliefs and practices however, were similar to those of Gardner, and some of their modern followers describe their faith as being a form of Wicca, whereas others insist it is different and call it "Traditional Witchcraft".

The terms "Wicca" and "Wiccen" were first used by Charles Cardell, not to refer purely to Gardnerians, but to refer to all followers of the Witch-Cult religion. In his notebooks he used the term "Wicca" to refer to the religion, and he called it the "Craft of the Wiccens" in a 1958 article in Light magazine.

Initially there was an attempt to reconcile and unite all of these traditions claiming to be Witch-Cult remnants, for instance the Witchcraft Research Association, which was founded in 1964 by Sybil Leek. After Leek emigrated to the United States, Doreen Valiente took over presidency, and began publication of a magazine, Pentagram. However both the magazine and the organisation collapsed amongst infighting by the various traditions, with Cochrane consistently insulting, and even calling for a "Night of the Long Knives", against Gardnerians.

=== Wicca across the world (1960s) ===
Within a few years of Gardner's propagation of the craft, Wicca had spread from England into neighbouring Scotland and Ireland. However, in the 1960s, it also began to spread much further abroad, most notably in the English-speaking nations of Australia and the United States.

In Australia, Wicca "found a receptive social environment because of the long-standing presence and familiarity of Aboriginal culture with its 'pagan' (i.e. 'non-Christian') beliefs and practices".

Gardnerian Wicca came to the United States through an Englishman who had recently emigrated to the US, named Raymond Buckland, and his wife, Rosemary. Raymond, working for British Airways, regularly returned to England, and he began to correspond with Gardner. In 1963, both Bucklands were initiated into the Gardnerian craft by Monique Wilson in a ceremony in Britain. The couple returned to America where they founded the Long Island coven in New York state, basing their practice upon the Gardnerian Book of Shadows. The coven was later taken over by a couple known only as Theos and Phoenix, who enlarged the Book of Shadows, adding further degrees of initiation which were required before members could found their own covens. Interest outstripped the ability of the mostly British-based covens to train and propagate members; the beliefs of the religion spread faster by the printed word or word of mouth than the initiatory system was prepared to handle.

Also in the 1960s, non-Gardnerian forms of Witchcraft (which are sometimes viewed as Wicca, or sometimes as "Traditional Witchcraft") made their way to the USA. The American Joseph Bearwalker Wilson corresponded with the English Robert Cochrane prior to Cochrane's ritual suicide in 1966, and from this he founded the 1734 Tradition. Sybil Leek too, an English witch from the New Forest, emigrated to California, where she continued to practice her craft, and teach others. In 1968 Gavin and Yvonne Frost established the Church and School of Wicca; which in 1972 became the first Federally-recognised Wiccan church.

It would be in the 2000s that Wicca would begin to gain a foothold in other nations; for instance, Ipsita Roy Chakraverti began to publicise it in India, and it also has a number of adherents in South Africa.

=== Alexandrian Wicca (1963–1973) ===
In the 1960s, an Englishman called Alex Sanders emerged, appearing in various newspapers. He claimed to be a hereditary witch, having been initiated into the craft by his grandmother. Later researchers, such as Ronald Hutton, have shown that he actually had been initiated into a Gardnerian coven, although Hutton notes that Sanders' grandmother was in fact "skilled in cunning craft". Sanders had previously practiced as a spiritualist healer.

His reputation in the tabloids increased when he married the much younger Maxine Sanders in a handfasting ceremony, and subsequently the duo began to refer to themselves as the "King and Queen of the Witches", at one point claiming to have the allegiance of 1,623 witches, and 127 northern covens. His tradition, which was later coined as "Alexandrian" by Stewart Farrar, an initiate of Sanders, incorporated aspects from ceremonial magic and the Qabalah, as well as Judeo-Christian iconography. Sanders justified this by claiming that his version of Wicca and Christianity were both forces for good, battling against the forces of darkness which were practised by Satanists and black magicians.

Several Gardnerians, including Patricia Crowther and Ray Bone, tried to denounce Sanders as a charlatan, but he simply responded by accusing them of being the charlatans, and as being practitioners of black magic who abused their initiates.

In 1973, Alex and Maxine separated, but both continued to practice the craft. One of the key reasons for their separation was that neither would compromise on Alex's bisexuality. After the divorce, Alex focused on formulating Wicca so that it could be followed by homosexual men, who had been partially prevented from involvement previously because of the religions' focus on gender polarity. He also initiated a number of people from continental Europe, who then spread the faith there. In 1979, Sanders issued an apology for his "past hurts" and "many public stupidities" and tried to encorouge co-operation between Gardnerians and Alexandrians. He died in 1988.

=== Algard and Seax (1972–1974) ===
In the United States, several forms of Wicca formed in the 1970s, based upon the Gardnerian and Alexandrian traditions, but with certain differences. These traditions were actually formed by those who had previously been initiated into Gardnerian or Alexandrian crafts, yet their traditions differ with the core of Gardnerian practice, and so they can not be traced to Gardner.

The first of these was Algard Wicca, founded in 1972 by Mary Nesnick, who had been initiated into both of the aforementioned traditions. Algard attempted to fuse the two together, thereby trying to prevent the arguments that were going on between the two.

The following year, in 1973, Raymond Buckland, who had brought the Gardnerian craft to the USA originally, ceased to practice it, and formed a new tradition, known as Seax-Wica. Seax reinterpreted the Gardnerian covens structure, innovating with the iconography of Anglo-Saxon paganism, so the God and the Goddess were represented not as the traditional Horned God and Mother Goddess, but as Woden and Freya. Seax was virtually unique amongst Wicca at the time as it did not work on an initiatory basis of covens; Buckland deliberately published all its rites and rituals in a book, The Tree, so that anyone could practice them.

=== Dianic Wicca and the feminist movement (1971–1979) ===
In 1971, a Hungarian-American named Zsuzsanna Budapest, who had no connection to any Gardnerian or Alexandrian covens, mixed Wiccan practices with feminist politics, forming Dianic Witchcraft (although now it is better known as "Dianic Wicca"). She began this with a coven in Los Angeles, that she named the Susan B. Anthony Coven Number One.

Dianic Wicca focused almost exclusively upon the Goddess, and largely, and in some covens completely, ignoring the Horned God. Most covens were women-only, and some were designed specifically for lesbians. Like Seax-Wica, which developed around the same time, the rituals of Dianic Wicca were published by its creator so that any woman could practice it, without having the need of a specific initiation into a lineage. Indeed, Budapest believed that it was every woman's right to be able to practice the religion, and she referred to it as being "women's spirituality".

Dianic Wicca was criticized by many Gardnerians at the time for having an almost monotheistic view of theology, in contrast with Wicca's traditional duotheism. One Gardnerian even declared "spare us Jahweh in drag!" in response to the focus on the one Goddess.

One Gardnerian, who went under the craft name of Starhawk, started practicing Dianic Wicca, and tried to reconcile the two, writing the 1979 book The Spiral Dance on the subject. The tradition she founded became known as Reclaiming, and mixed Wicca with other forms of Neopaganism such as Feri, along with strong principles of environmental protection.

=== Solitaries and the "Wicca or Witchcraft" debate (1970–present) ===
In traditional Gardnerian and Alexandrian craft, initiates took an oath of secrecy never to reveal the rituals of it to outsiders. Despite this, both Gardner and Sanders sought publicity, and allowed reporters to witness their practices. Initiates such as Valiente and Buckland had been annoyed at this, the first commenting that "by speaking to the press, Gardner was compromising the security of the group and the sincerity of his own teachings". However, the key rituals of the Gardnerians (which were the basis for most of the Alexandrian ones) were made public in the 1960s when Charles Cardell, in an act of spite against the recently deceased Gardner, published the Gardnerian Book of Shadows.

In 1970, Paul Huson published Mastering Witchcraft a book purportedly based upon non-Wiccan traditional British witchcraft, and the first do-it-yourself manual for the would-be witch, which became one of the basic instruction books for a large number of covens.

In 1971 Lady Sheba (Jessie Wicker Bell, 1920–2002), the Kentucky-born self-styled "Queen of the American Witches", published what she claimed was her family's centuries-old grimoire, but which in fact contained material substantially plagiarised from the Gardnerian Book of Shadows, and also included poetry by Doreen Valiente that was, and is, still under copyright.

Doreen Valiente also published information on the subject of pagan Witchcraft, such as the 1973 book An ABC of Witchcraft, which contained a self-initiation ritual for solitary practitioners.

Following this, other Wiccans decided that it would be better to simply reveal the Wiccan mysteries to the public in their true form. These included Stewart and Janet Farrar, two Alexandrian initiates. Stewart, prior to his marriage, had already published information on Wiccan rituals (with Sanders' blessing), in his 1971 book What Witches Do. Together they published further works on the subjects, such Eight Sabbats for Witches (1981) and The Witches' Way (1984).

From these published writings, many other practitioners began to follow the Witchcraft religion, working either as solitary Witches or in non-lineaged covens. Valiente herself considered all of these such people to be "Witches", and she reserved the term "Wiccan" to refer solely to Gardnerians. Despite this, most of the newer followers used the term "Wiccan" to describe themselves, and in the United States, it became the norm to refer to any Neopagan witchcraft as "Wicca", and so Gardnerians, Alexandrians and Algards, wishing to emphasize their lineage that stretched back to Gardner, began referring to themselves as followers of "British Traditional Wicca".

== Contemporary Wicca ==
=== Pop-culture Wicca (1996–) ===
In the 1990s and 2000s, Wicca began to become ingrained in popular culture. Aspects of Wicca were incorporated into the New Age movement, and many Wiccans took on New Age beliefs and practices. Wicca was also taken up by popular entertainment; in 1996, the American film The Craft was released about four witches who are corrupted by their power. The same year the television series Sabrina the Teenage Witch appeared, which was followed the following year by Buffy the Vampire Slayer, and in 1998 by the series Charmed and the film Practical Magic. Whilst these were heavily criticized by many Wiccans (Margot Adler called The Craft "the worst movie ever made!"), they did encourage many teenagers and young adults to investigate more about the religion. Most covens and Neopagan groups refused to allow under 18s into their ranks, and so many teenagers turned to books to find out more. In turn, several books were published to cater for them, including Silver RavenWolf's Teen Witch: Wicca for a New Generation and Scott Cunningham's Wicca: A Guide for the Solitary Practitioner. This helped to bring about the Teen Wicca movement, and it has been suggested that the reason why so many young adults are attracted to the faith can "be attributed to the fact that it tackles issues that teenagers are interested in – in a way that other religions do not." The popularity of Wicca amongst teens has also brought problems; in 2001, a 12-year-old American schoolgirl named Tempest Smith committed suicide after being bullied for her faith.

However the rise of this teenage-focused, New Age, pop-culture Wicca has been highly criticized by traditionalists, many of whom refuse to accept it as Wicca, instead using terms like "wicca-lite". The historians Brooks Alexander and Jeffrey Russell commented that "pop-culture witchcraft is sufficiently vague in structure and content to qualify more as a 'lifestyle' than a 'religion'."

The rise of the internet also had an effect on Wicca. Previously, solitary Wiccans around the world had little way of communicating amongst one another, however, the internet allowed them to do so. Websites such as Witchvox.com were set up. Historian Brooks Alexander commented that this was a form of "minority empowerment".

=== Gaining recognition ===
For a long time, Wicca was seen as being simply a minor sect, or cult. However, with the rise of solitary practitioners describing themselves as Wiccans, the faith went from becoming simply a mystery cult to becoming a public religion.

Groups were formed to represent the Wiccan community, such as the Covenant of the Goddess, which was founded in 1975. Wiccans began to appear on various British television documentaries, including The Heaven & Earth Show and Desperately Seeking Something.

In the US, the court case of Dettmer v. Landon in 1986 established that Wicca was a religion, and therefore should be treated as such under the eyes of the law.

The first Wiccan wedding to be legally recognized in the UK (by the Registrars of Scotland) was performed in 2004.

== Bibliography ==
- Doyle White, Ethan (2016). Wicca: History, Belief, and Community in Modern Pagan Witchcraft. Brighton: Sussex Academic Press. ISBN 978-1-84519-754-4.
- Heselton, Philip (2000). Wiccan Roots: Gerald Gardner and the Modern Witchcraft Revival. Chieveley, Berkshire: Capall Bann.
- Heselton, Philip (2003). Gerald Gardner and the Cauldron of Inspiration: An Investigation into the Sources of Gardnerian Witchcraft. Milverton, Somerset: Capall Bann.
- Hutton, Ronald (1999). The Triumph of the Moon: A History of Modern Pagan Witchcraft. New York: Oxford University Press. ISBN 0-19-820744-1.
- Kelly, Aidan A. (1991). Crafting the Art of Magic, Book I: A History of Witchcraft, 1939–1964. St. Paul, Minnesota: Llewellyn.
- Kelly, Aidan A. (2007). Inventing Witchcraft: A Case Study in the Creation of a New Religion. Loughborough: Thoth Publications.
- Murray, Margaret Alice (1921). The Witch-cult in Western Europe: A Study in Anthropology. Clarendon Press. ISBN 9780722226407.
- Murray, Margaret Alice (1933). The God of the Witches. S. Low, Marston & Company, Limited.
- Valiente, Doreen (1989). The Rebirth of Witchcraft. London: Robert Hale.
