= Aidan A. Kelly =

American academic, poet, and Wiccan

Aidan A. Kelly (born October 22, 1940) is an American academic, poet and influential figure in the Neopagan religion of Wicca. Having developed his own branch of the faith, the New Reformed Orthodox Order of the Golden Dawn, during the 1960s, he was also initiated into other traditions, including Gardnerianism and Feri, in subsequent decades. Alongside this, he was also an important figure in the creation of the Covenant of the Goddess, an organisation designed to protect the civil rights of members of the Wiccan community in the United States. He has also published academic work studying the early development of Gardnerian Wiccan liturgy, primarily through his controversial 1991 book Crafting the Art of Magic.

Kelly became an organizer and leader in the Neo-Pagan community while studying for a master's degree in creative writing at San Francisco State University in 1967 and 1968. A friend asked him to write a ritual for a Witch sabbat as part of an art seminar. This project led to the founding in October 1967 of the New Reformed Orthodox Order of the Golden Dawn (NROOGD), which evolved into a Wiccan coven in 1969. Although humorously named after the famous Hermetic Order of the Golden Dawn, Kelly's coven was otherwise unrelated to that group.

The NROOGD tradition co-founded by Kelly in 1969 continues to operate in California and has covens in other states, Canada and the UK.

As one of the co-founders of the Covenant of the Goddess (CoG), Kelly helped write the organization's charter and bylaws in 1975. The organization's charter was filed with the State of California on October 31, 1975, incorporating CoG as a non-profit religious corporation. From CoG's inception in 1975 until 1977, Kelly served on its national board of directors.

== Early life and education ==
Aidan Kelly was born on October 22, 1940, in Colon, Panama, the first of four children of Marie Cecile Kelly and John Patrick Kelly. Panama was his father's first assignment as a U.S. Army officer after graduating from West Point. John Patrick Kelly's military career took the family to assignments around the world. In 1955 they settled in Mill Valley, California, where Kelly graduated from Tamalpais High School in 1957. Later Aidan would find out that, from the time of WWII until the 1990s, his father was working as a high-ranking military intelligence officer.

Shortly after moving to Mill Valley, Kelly experienced what he described as a "spontaneous mystical experience," when a vision of the Goddess first appeared to him at the age of 15. Although Kelly was raised as a Roman Catholic, his vision of the Goddess in Mill Valley triggered a lifelong interest in alternative religions.

After graduating from high school, Kelly studied at the University of California, Berkeley, then San Francisco State University (San Francisco State College at that time), where he received his bachelor's degree in 1964.

== Professional career ==
After graduating from San Francisco State in 1964, Kelly worked as an editor for Stanford University Press. He returned to San Francisco State in 1966, where he completed a master's degree in creative writing in 1968. From then, until 1973, Kelly worked for publisher W. H. Freeman and Company. At the end of 1973, he left W. H. Freeman to begin working on a Ph.D. at the Graduate Theological Union (GTU) in Berkeley. He also started his own business as a consulting editor at this time.

While working on his Ph.D. during 1974 and 1975, Kelly was able to study pages from an early Book of Shadows, purportedly typed by Gerald Gardner as well as a manuscript titled “Ye Bok of ye Art Magical” from Gardner's former Museum of Witchcraft, then owned by Ripley's, now owned by the Wiccan Church of Canada. He hoped to use these materials to reconstruct a history of how Gardner founded modern Wicca. The resulting manuscript was used to satisfy his comprehensive examination topic in Sociology of Religion for his doctorate program at GTU. Although Kelly wrote the manuscript under contract to Llewellyn Publications, it was declined by Llewellyn as "too difficult and scholarly." He offered the book to other publishers without success.

In 1976, Kelly sought help from Alcoholics Anonymous. He withdrew from participation in the Neo-Pagan community in 1977 and became a practicing Roman Catholic from 1978 until 1987. However, as Kelly explained in a 2006 interview with Lisa Harris of Widdershins, he "never stopped being a witch; I just stopped practicing for a while."

In 1978, Kelly self-published the memoir Hippie Commie Beatnik Witches: A History of the Craft in California, 1967-77 about the rise of modern American Paganism. The academic scholar Chas S. Clifton has cited the book as an "invaluable source" for the sociological study of the History of Wicca, particularly insofar as it describes the innate differences between "the more established Anglo-American witches" who claimed lineage-descent from Gerald Gardner and the West Coast Pagans of the 1960s who were working in "the American tradition of self-creation."

Kelly received a Ph.D. in Theology from GTU in 1980. For the next eight years, he taught at schools in the San Francisco Bay area, including the University of San Francisco and Holy Family College. He was active in scholarly professional societies, and from 1987 to 1990 co-chaired the steering committee for the American Academy of Religion's Group on New Religious Movements.

Llewellyn published Kelly's previously rejected research as Crafting the Art of Magic in 1991, revised and expanded as Inventing Witchcraft in 2007.

After moving to Seattle, Washington, in 1997, Kelly worked for several companies related to Microsoft. He accepted a teaching position for the Berkeley Learning Center in Lakewood, Washington, in 2001. In 2008, Kelly and his family moved to New Orleans, where he taught for ITT Technical Institute and continued to write.

== Personal life ==
Kelly moved to Tacoma, Washington, in 2011 with his family. He lives there currently and practices Witchcraft with his wife and close friends. His eldest son, Aidan O'Ryan-Kelly, born in 1990, lives in California and is also a professional practitioner of Witchcraft and folk-magic.

== Controversial work ==
Inventing Witchcraft labels "the Craft" as a new religion, founded by Gerald Gardner "in 1947, give or take a year." (p. 33-34) This theory obviously conflicts with Gardner's own claim to have been initiated in 1939 into one of England's last surviving witch covens. Kelly's book identifies the initiation of Gardner as "the foundational myth" of Modern Witchcraft. (p. 35)

In support of his theory, Kelly explains that "the paper trail stops in 1946. We have no serious historical evidence for the existence of any Gardnerian coven before then." (p. 32)

Academic writers on religion have tended to treat Kelly's conclusions as factual and unbiased, but not surprisingly, Inventing Witchcraft and the earlier edition of Kelly's work, Crafting the Art of Magic, became a source of controversy among Wiccans, especially in Gardnerian Wicca covens, who trace the origin of their traditions to Gerald Gardner. To accept Kelly's theory that Gardner "invented" a new religion, would mean giving up the belief that Gardnerian Wicca was the revival of an ancient faith previously held in secret by a few survivors. (p. 28)

Kelly's work was criticized for both its overall premise and specific details. Donald H. Frew complained that Crafting the Art of Magic contained errors in quoting source texts to support Kelly's theory. Frew also objected to the accusation of homophobia (Inventing Witchcraft, p. 155) that Kelly felt was exhibited by Gardner's writings.

The "new religion" concept in Kelly's work was not entirely unwelcome in the Wiccan community. Other Neo-Pagan historians, such as Ronald Hutton, and Jacqueline Simpson, wrote supportive responses to Kelly's work, disputing some of the criticism.

== Bibliography ==
- Inventing Witchcraft: A Case Study in the Creation of a New Religion, Thoth Publications (2008) ISBN 1-870450-58-2
- Religious Holidays and Calendars: An Encyclopaedic Handbook, co-authored with Peter D. Dresser and Linda M. Ross. Omnigraphic, Inc. (1993) ISBN 1-55888-348-7
- Crafting the Art of Magic, Book I: A History of Modern Witchcraft, 1939-1964 (Llewellyn's Modern Witchcraft Series), Llewellyn Publications (1991). ISBN 0-87542-370-1
- New Age Almanac, co-authored with J. Gordon Melton and Jerome Clark. Visible Ink (1991). ISBN 0-8103-9402-2
- The Evangelical Christian Anti-Cult Movement: Christian Counter-Cult Literature, Vol. 13 of Garland's Cults and New Religions series. Garland Pub. (1990). ISBN 0-8240-4374-X
- Cults and the Jewish community: Representatives Works of Jewish Anti-Cult Literature, Vo. 14 of Garland's Cults and New Religions series. Garland Pub. (1990). ISBN 0-8240-4487-8
- New Age Encyclopedia: A Guide to the Beliefs, Concepts, Terms, People, and Organizations that Make Up the New Global Movement toward Spiritual Development, Health and Healing, Higher Consciousness, and Related Topics, co-authored with J. Gordon Melton and Jerome Clark. Gale Research (1990). ISBN 0-8103-7159-6
- Theosophy: I (Cults and New Religions) co-authored with James R. Lewis. Garland Publishing Inc. (1990). ISBN 978-0-8240-4367-4
- Theosophy: II (Cults and New Religions) co-authored with James R. Lewis. Garland Publishing Inc.(1990). ISBN 978-0-8240-4368-1
- Neo-Pagan Witchcraft I (Cults and New Relitions), Garland Pub. (1990). ISBN 0-8240-4497-5
- Neo-Pagan Witchcraft II (Cults and New Religions), Garland Pub. (1990). ISBN 978-0-8240-4497-8
- The Wedding Guests: A Comedy, Graduate Theological Union (1980)
- The New Healers: Healing the Whole Person co-authored with Larry Geis and Alta Picchi Kelly. Ronin Pub (1980). ISBN 978-0-915904-49-5
- Moving Into Space (The Myths and Realities of Extra Terrestrial Life) Harper & Row Publishers (1980). ISBN 978-0-06-080499-2
- Hippie Commie Beatnik Witches: A History of the Craft in California, 1967-77 Self-published (1978)
- History and Other Explorations: Selected Poems, 1966-1974, Hierophant Wordsmiths (1974). ASIN: B00072WLGW
