= Dorothy Clutterbuck =

English socialite and alleged Wiccan (1880–1951)

Dorothy Clutterbuck (19 January 1880 – 12 January 1951), was a wealthy Englishwoman who lived in Highcliffe, Dorset. She was named by Gerald Gardner as a leading member of the New Forest coven, a group of pagan Witches into which Gardner claimed to have been initiated in 1939. She has therefore become a figure of some significance in the history of Wicca. Clutterbuck was a practising Anglican Christian, and never identified herself as a witch. Researchers have debated whether the surviving evidence of her own writings indicates that she had any unconventional religious leanings at all.

== Biography ==
Clutterbuck was born in British India, and was the daughter of Thomas St. Quentin Clutterbuck, a British army officer. After her father's retirement, she appears to have moved back to England and to have lived with him in the Christchurch area of the New Forest in southern England. After her father's death, she continued to live in the same house alone, but at the age of 55 she married Rupert Fordham, a local Justice of the Peace who was of high rank in the Salvation Army. Fordham died in May 1939 in a car accident.

Clutterbuck appears to have been an outwardly respectable member of the local community, a supporter of the Conservative Party and the Church of England. She left a sizeable legacy to the local Anglican priest in her will. Her estate was valued at £60,000, a very large sum for the time. The one scandal attached to her was that Rupert Fordham was already married to a mentally ill woman, so that he and Dorothy Clutterbuck were not legally married.

== Clutterbuck and Wicca ==
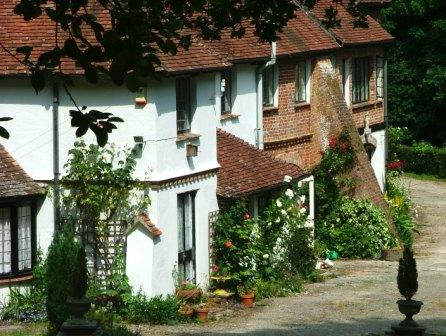
Chewton Mill House, the house in Highcliffe owned by Dorothy and reputedly the site of Gardner's initiation.

After her death in 1951, Clutterbuck was identified by Gerald Gardner as a leading member of the New Forest coven of witches into which he claimed to have been initiated in September 1939. Gardner referred to her only as "Old Dorothy" in his publications, but gave her full name to personal acquaintances. Gardner's statements were interpreted by his pupil Doreen Valiente as implying that Clutterbuck had personally initiated him into the coven, but later authors such as Philip Heselton and Eleanor Bone claim that his initiator was in fact Edith Woodford-Grimes. Some writers, such as historian Jeffrey Burton Russell, suggest that "Old Dorothy" had been invented by Gardner, but Valiente, knowing her full name, obtained her birth, marriage and death certificates and published a basic outline of her life in 1985 to prove that she existed.

It continues to be debated whether Gardner's claims that Clutterbuck was involved in pagan witchcraft were true, or whether Gardner used the name of a respectable local worthy as a private joke and to distract attention from his true magical partner, Edith Woodford-Grimes. Ronald Hutton and Leo Ruickbie have concluded that Clutterbuck is unlikely to have been involved in Gardner's activities, in particular because of her apparent commitment to Christianity. Hutton also points out that the date of Gardner's initiation would coincide with a period of mourning in 1939 when she had cancelled all other social engagements. Conversely, Philip Heselton believes that Clutterbuck was involved in occult activities, and that her practice of Christianity was social and conventional in nature. The principal body of evidence to which both sides appeal is provided by Clutterbuck's own diaries.

== The diaries ==
Clutterbuck left three volumes of diaries, which are more similar to commonplace books, filled with daily poems and illustrations and intended to be read by visitors to her home.

The researchers Ronald Hutton and Philip Heselton have both read Clutterbuck's diaries, and have come to entirely different conclusions on their contents. Hutton believes that Clutterbuck's poems show her to be a "simple" and "kindly" woman with no connections with paganism or the occult. Heselton, on the other hand, believes that her writings reveal that "Dorothy was a pagan in all but name."

The evidence cited by Heselton and his supporters consists both of the absence of overt Christian themes and the apparent presence of pagan sentiments. Heselton notes that "there is hardly a mention of Jesus and it seems as if her deepest spiritual experiences come from nature and, particularly, her garden." "Midsummer," Heselton says "is lauded as 'the day of all days most dear'". Nature and the feelings of magical enchantment that come from it are commonly repeated themes, as is the theme of a fairy-like dancing maiden, often referred to as 'the Queen', who seems to personify the seasons and the land.

The diaries also contain references to fairies and the full moon; bits of herb-lore, and occasionally vivid descriptions of classical gods such as Aurora. Other examples seem more ambiguous, and could equally express Christian or Pagan sentiment, or simple poetic metaphor.
