= Donald H. Frew =

Donald Hudson Frew III

Personal life
- Born: May 11, 1960 (age 66) Long Beach, California
- Spouse: Anna Korn

Religious life
- Religion: Wicca
- Church: Coven Trismegiston, Berkeley, California

Senior posting
- Post: Trustee, Global Council of the United Religions Initiative; board member, Interfaith Center at the Presidio; national interfaith representative, Covenant of the Goddess

Donald Hudson 'Don' Frew is a figure in American Wicca, the Covenant of the Goddess, interfaith dialogue, and Pagan studies.

== Wicca and the Covenant of the Goddess ==
Frew's interest in Wicca began at age 12 in a group mentored by nearby Witch Lilith St. John. In 1983 Frew was initiated into Coven Firestar, a NROOGD (New Reformed Order of the Golden Dawn) coven and later into a Gardnerian coven (Tobar Bhride) in 1985. He is an Elder in both the NROOGD and Gardnerian Traditions of Neopagan witchcraft or Wicca. He is High Priest of a Gardnerian coven in Berkeley, California – Coven Trismegiston – with his wife.

Frew's covens have been members in the Covenant of the Goddess (or "CoG", the world's largest religious organization for Witches), and in 1985 he was elected CoG's second Public Information Officer. He has, since then, served nine terms on CoG's National Board.

== Work with law enforcement ==
Since 1985 Frew has worked with law enforcement as a consultant on the occult. Frew served as an occult expert / consultant on the McMartin Preschool Trial, the Leonard Lake serial killings, and the Matamoros murders, among others.

In 1986, with his college friend Shawn Carlson, Frew proposed that the Committee for the Scientific Examination of Religion (CSER) investigate the rising and widespread claims of "Satanic Ritual Abuse" or "SRA." A two-year investigation followed, by members of CSER, Robert Hicks of the Justice Department, and Ken Lanning of the FBI, with Frew, Carlson, and others. The results were published in as "Satanism in America: How the Devil Got Much More than his Due". This report, finding no evidence of organized criminal activity by Satanist groups, turned the tide of law enforcement opinion against claims of widespread criminal activity by Satanic cults.

== Work with evangelical Christians ==
In 1986, Frew had a dialogue with the Spiritual Counterfeits Project, a Berkeley-based Evangelical Christian research organization focused against cults and the occult.

== Interfaith work ==
Frew has worked to obtain recognition of Pagan and Indigenous peoples as members of interfaith councils. As a Wiccan, Frew joined the Berkeley Area Interfaith Council (BAIC) in 1985, and was elected to its executive committee in 1986. In 1987 he was appointed Executive Secretary, becoming the first Witch to serve as an officer on the board of a local interfaith council in the United States.

Through Frew's efforts, in 1992 the Covenant of the Goddess became one of four Neopagan organizations to co-sponsor the 1993 Parliament of the World's Religions.

Frew has continued to represent CoG at all of the subsequent Parliaments—Cape Town 1999, Barcelona 2004, Melbourne 2009—and be active in key events. In 1997 Frew became one of only three Pagan representatives in the Parliament's "Assembly of the World's Religious and Spiritual Leaders".
