= Rhiannon Ryall =

Rhiannon Ryall (real name Maureen Mileham) is the pseudonym of an English-born Australian Wiccan who achieved notoriety for her controversial claims regarding the existence of a group of Wiccans living in England's West Country during the 1940s. These claims were first publicised in 1993 when the English company Capall Bann published Ryall's West Country Wicca: A Journal of the Old Religion, in which she made the claims that when growing up along the borders between the English counties of Devon and Somerset, she was initiated into a local Wiccan tradition that many of the people in the surrounding villages were members of. Claiming that they were "pre-Gardnerian", she asserted that her family had not been Wiccan, and as such she was not a hereditary witch, but that aged sixteen, she, like many other boys and girls who were the same age, were taken to the female "Elders of the village" who taught them about the Craft.

Ryall continued her claim, asserting that the religion's local followers worshiped the Great Goddess, who was often known as "the Green Lady" and who it was believed slept during the winter months, along with a Horned God, whom they referred to as "Old Horny". Ryall claimed that the Wiccans met in secretive covens and performed the Drawing Down the Moon rite as a part of their faith, (Note: The Drawing Down the Moon ritual in fact originated within the Gardnerian tradition during the 1950s.) as well as celebrating five Sabbats annually, which were termed Lady Day (25 March), Beltane (30 April), the Summer Solstice (21 June), Samhain (31 October) and the Winter Solstice (21 December). (Note: In most Wiccan traditions, eight Sabbats are celebrated annually, rather than five.) Describing the group's practices, she claimed that they wore robes, which were "mainly brown or black, although for festivals they were usually green" and that they used a cup, a knife, a wand and a dish of salt as their ritual tools. She also claimed that they wrote nothing down, and as such did not make use of a Book of Shadows.

Nonetheless, historians and researchers studying the history of Wicca have been very sceptical of Ryall's claims. Professor Ronald Hutton stated that "If Ryall's claims had concerned just a coven or two, then they might have been more plausible, but to portray a widespread and deeply entrenched folk religion stretches credulity to breaking point. The possibility must therefore be accepted that, while in Australia, she has devised her own variety of Wicca, which she has tried here to pass off as an old tradition."

In later years, Ryall went on to write and publish a number of other books on Wicca and magic through Capall Bann, including Celtic Lore and Druid Ritual (1994), Weaving the Web of Magic: A Potpourri of Rituals, Chants, Dances, Webs, Cords, Runes, Talismans and Magical Information (1996) and Teachings of the Wisewomen (2000).

In 1994, Ryall received a three year sentence for kidnapping her granddaughter from the child's father. The case was dramatised in the 1999 film Witch Hunt.
