= Cerridwen Fallingstar =

American Wiccan priestess and author

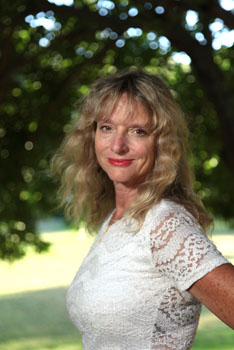
- Fallingstar in 2009
- Born: Cheri A. Lesh; November 15, 1952 (age 73); Southern California, U.S.
- Education: Beloit College; University of California, Los Angeles
- Occupations: Wiccan priestess; shamanic witch; author
- Spouse: Elie Demers
- Children: 1

Cerridwen Fallingstar (born Cheri A. Lesh, November 15, 1952), is an American Wiccan priestess, shamanic witch, and author. Since the late 1970s she has written, taught, and lectured about magic, ritual, and metaphysics, and is considered a leading authority on pagan witchcraft.

She is the author of three historical novels, which she refers to as "posthumous autobiographies" – memories from previous lives. In 2020, she published a memoir, Broth from the Cauldron.

== Early life and education ==
Cerridwen Fallingstar was born Cheri A. Lesh, in 1952 in Southern California. Her father was an aerospace engineer for Aerospace Corporation, and her mother was a librarian. According to Fallingstar, "As a tiny kid, I was always remembering adventures from other lives, trying to remind my parents of various other places we had lived. ... I also spoke constantly, as soon as I could talk, about Witches, herbs and spells, a development which made my agnostic parents slightly uneasy."

She attended Beloit College from 1970 to 1974, receiving a degree in English literature and English composition. She obtained a master's degree in English literature from UCLA in 1976.

== Career ==
=== Journalism and early Wiccanism ===
In the mid to late 1970s, Fallingstar pursued a career as a journalist in Los Angeles, writing mainly for the alternative press. Still using her birth name, she wrote often on feminism, feminist sexuality, and related matters.

In early 1975, she was writing for a feminist newsletter at the time Wiccan pioneer Zsuzsanna Budapest was arrested in Los Angeles for fortune-telling from reading tarot cards. Budapest asserted that this was an arrest for witchcraft, and that it violated her right to freedom of religion. Fallingstar did a lengthy interview with Budapest, and subsequently studied extensively with her, joining Budapest's all-women Susan B. Anthony coven. Fallingstar founded her own first coven, Kallisti, in 1975; and she began publishing poetry and literature under her Craft name, Cerridwen Fallingstar – from Cerridwen, the Celtic goddess of rebirth and transformation. Her journalism also began reflecting her involvement in feminist spirituality and paganism.

She studied also with noted Wiccan teacher and author Starhawk, and in 1980 was a founding member of a coven called the Holy Terrors, along with fellow Starhawk students Bone Blossom, Sophia Sparks, and M. Macha NightMare. She worked closely with Starhawk on the Reclaiming Collective, a ritual and teaching organization in the San Francisco Bay Area, from 1980 to 1986. She was also an early member, Minister, and Elder of the Wiccan fellowship Covenant of the Goddess.

In an academic paper in the early 1980s, she wrote:

Women within this religion [Wicca] have a positive feminine principle to relate to, a mirror in which to find validation, self-worth and self-love. The Goddess possesses all the best aspects and attributes of femaleness. ... Wicca is the most Goddess-oriented of the pagan faiths, and places the most emphasis on developing the intuitional psychic side of the personality – the side that has to do with the craft of magic. Wicca emphasizes the power of the individual, and in a society where women have been denied access to power, this is a crucial concept indeed.

In the 1980s, living in Marin County in Northern California, Fallingstar continued her professional work in the areas of shamanism, witchcraft, trancework, healing, and psychic work. She also studied with spiritual teachers from various other traditions, including Native American, West African, Tantra, Reiki, Zen, Kundalini Yoga, and New Age teachings.

=== First book ===
Following the publication of her 1990 book, The Heart of the Fire, seen as an authentic look at 16th-century Celtic paganism, Fallingstar became an established voice for Wicca, witchcraft, and paganism. In 1991 she founded an organization called EarthRite, which offered public rituals in Northern California for 12 years, and that year she also founded her third coven, Eye of the Crescent. She was interviewed for the 1995 compendium book, People of the Earth: The New Pagans Speak Out.

In 2009, she was interviewed in the documentary film, Dancing with Gaia. She has also been interviewed for media outlets including Time magazine CNN, the Oxygen Channel, Pacific Sun, and FoxNews.com.

She lectures and teaches classes and workshops, including a year-long apprenticeship program, and has also led spiritual journeys to sacred sites in Scotland. Additionally, she works as a professional psychic. She also provides past-life hypnotic regressions, and trance journeys, which she describes as hypnotherapy in a shamanic context.

== Books ==
Fallingstar has written three historical novels. According to her, these books are descriptions of her own past lives, accessed via a form of hypnotic regression, which she combines with historical research.

=== The Heart of the Fire ===
In 1990, she published her first book, The Heart of the Fire – about a young witch named Fiona McNair and her coven, in rural 16th-century Scotland, during the time of the witch trials. The book was well received by many alternative press journals, including Yoga Journal and Green Egg. New Directions for Women wrote:

In the business of writing, few authors can successfully write about their own experiences and have them accepted by the reading public. Very little has been published by authors who were actually writing about experiences they had in another lifetime. Taylor Caldwell claimed to have lived her own novels, but nobody really believed her. Fallingstar, on the other hand, augments her past-life experience with meticulous research into the period and a stunning use of detail. There are no anachronisms in The Heart of the Fire. A vividly written and compelling book that is next to impossible to put down.

The Heart of the Fire became a staple of Wiccan literature, and Merlin Stone wrote of it, "Cerridwen Fallingstar is a brilliant writer. The power of the Goddess shines through all that she does." Portions of it have also been anthologized in other books.

=== White as Bone, Red as Blood ===
Fallingstar's second historical novel, about a Shinto priestess, poet, and imperial companion in classical 12th-century Japan, was published in 2009 as White as Bone, Red as Blood: The Fox Sorceress. It was followed in 2011 by White as Bone, Red as Blood: The Storm God. Together, these two books chronicle the transition of Japanese culture from the refined and poetic Heian period to the warlike Shogunate period, as seen through the eyes of the protagonist, Seiko Fujiwara. Seiko's father is an erudite court poet, and her mother is an Inari priestess.

The San Francisco Book Review wrote of the first volume: "Cerridwen Fallingstar's second historical novel, White as Bone, Red as Blood: The Fox Sorceress, is by far one of the best reads to come along in a while, historical fiction or otherwise. ... With action from page one, The Fox Sorceress is an engaging tale with awing intricate historic detail. Though character and plot drive, the book has what any reader wants in a story: love, loyalty, deceit, betrayal, murder, passion, and even erotica." The Midwest Book Review wrote of it: "The rise of the Samurai in Japan was not a peaceful occurrence. ... Seiko Fujiwara, a potential sorceress, may just hold the key to the salvation of her country. But fulfilling the prophecy is never an easy thing. White as Bone, Red as Blood is an interesting and excellent read". The Japan Times reviewer reported that: "The Heian Period is portrayed as balanced and civilized before the onslaught of the samurai and the overthrow of the emperor by the Kamakura shogunate. The history of Japanese religion forms a large part of the story: Shinto gods (kami), Fujiyama, the sun goddess Amaterasu, tanuki and Inari deities all have narrative space. The author imagines a mostly realistic 12th-century Japan ... contrasting the world of the court, poetry and tradition with that of superstition, fancy and ritual."

Apex Reviews had this to say about the first volume:

Exquisite and elegantly crafted, White As Bone, Red As Blood provides the reader with a vivid, eye-opening look into the inner workings of a vaunted ancient culture. Chronicling everything from love affairs to political intrigue to gruesome warfare to mystical enchantments, Cerridwen Fallingstar's sweeping tale paints a fantastical, yet realistic picture of a unique culture unlike any other in the history of civilization. With superbly crafted characters and riveting action, White As Bone is sure to have readers reading and re-reading passage after passage – leaving them with indelible impressions they won't long forget.

=== Broth from the Cauldron ===
In 2020, Fallingstar published a memoir, Broth from the Cauldron: A Wisdom Journey Through Everyday Magic. The book is a series of vignettes about her experiences and development as a shamanic witch, and draws on themes of spirituality, history, and psychology, while also addressing social and political issues.

== Personal life ==
Fallingstar was married to Elie Demers, a psychiatric nurse, for 25 years, until his sudden death in 1996 at the age of 44. They have one son, Zachary, born in 1982. Fallingstar lives in the town of San Geronimo in Marin County, California.

== Bibliography ==
- Fallingstar, Cerridwen. The Heart of the Fire. Cauldron Publications, 1990.
- Fallingstar, Cerridwen. White as Bone, Red as Blood: The Fox Sorceress. Cauldron Publications, 2009.
- Fallingstar, Cerridwen. White as Bone, Red as Blood: The Storm God. Cauldron Publications, 2011.
- Fallingstar, Cerridwen. Broth from the Cauldron: A Wisdom Journey through Everyday Magic. She Writes Press, 2020. ISBN 978-1-63152-699-2
