= Vivianne Crowley =

English writer and Wiccan priestess

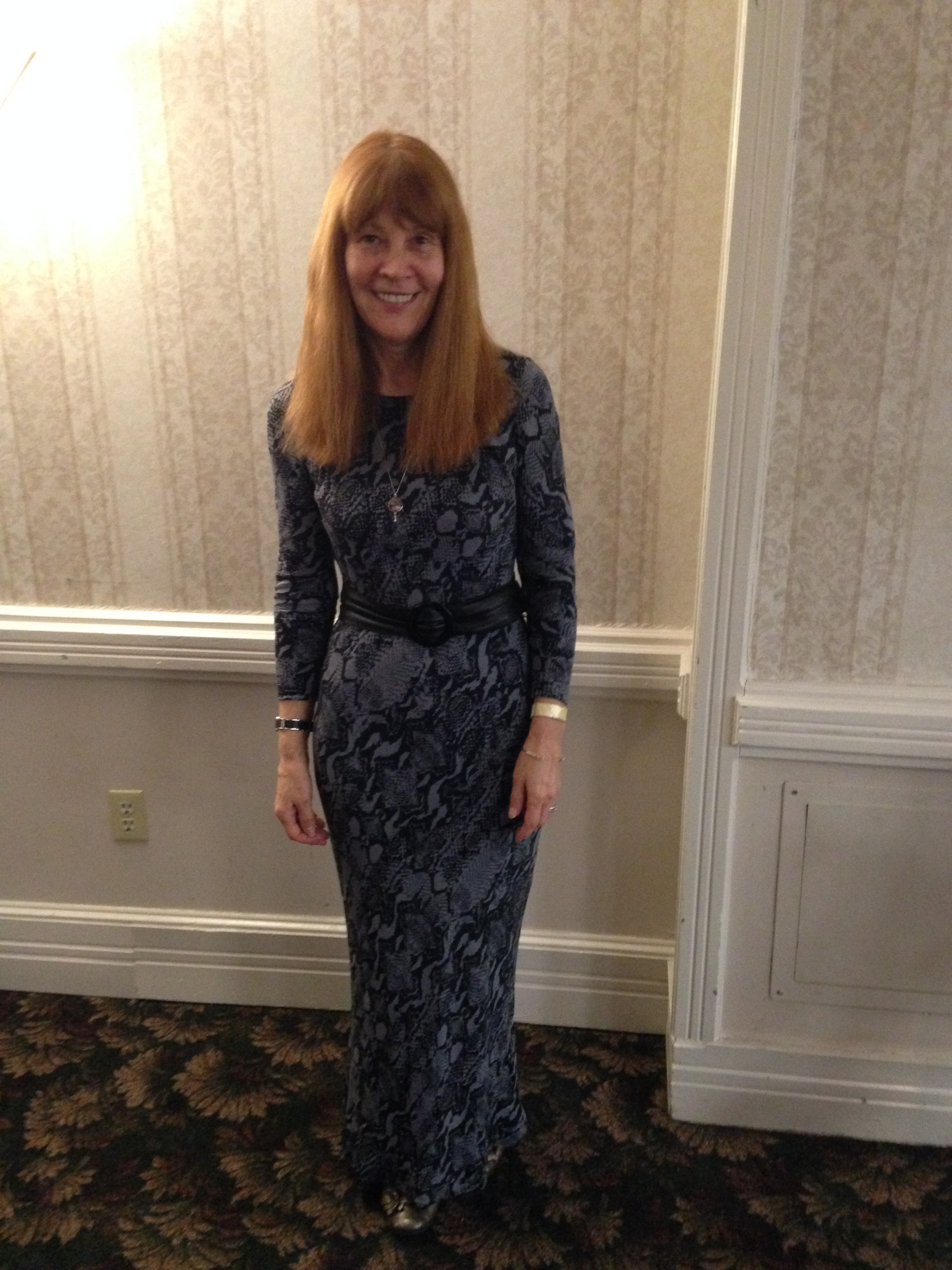
- Vivianne Crowley in 2015
- Education: University of London
- Occupations: Writer, university lecturer, psychologist

Vivianne Crowley is an English writer, university lecturer, psychologist, and a High Priestess and teacher of the Wiccan religion.

== Life ==
Crowley was initiated into the London coven of Alex Sanders (founder of the Alexandrian tradition of Wicca) at the age of eighteen, but later joined a Gardnerian coven in the famous Whitecroft line derived from Eleanor Bone, and was one of few people in the seventies to be part of both traditions.

Crowley founded the Wicca Study Group in London in 1988, and became secretary of the Pagan Federation the same year. Crowley was described as "very influential in recent developments in Wicca... She has more or less captained the bringing together of the Gardnerian and Alexandrian Traditions through the process of cross-initiation, where a person is initiated into both Traditions". Professor Ronald Hutton also described Crowley as "the closest thing that Britain possessed to an informal successor to Alex Sanders.

As an interfaith coordinator for the Federation, Crowley served as the U.K. coordinator of the Pagan Chaplaincy Services for H.M. Prisons. In 1989, she released her first book Wicca: The Old Religion in the New Age, which became one of the most widely known books on Wicca. It was revised and updated in 1996 as Wicca: The Old Religion in the New Millennium.

Crowley is a Jungian psychologist who formerly lectured on the psychology of religion at King's College London, University of London. She holds a bachelor's degree and Ph.D. in Psychology from the University of London. She is also an adjunct professor at the Union Institute in Cincinnati, Ohio.

== Publications ==
=== Books ===
- Wicca: The Old Religion in the New Age. Element Books Ltd. 1989. ISBN 978-0-7225-3271-3. Revised and updated in 1996 as Wicca: The Old Religion in the New Millennium.
- Phoenix from the Flame: Pagan Spirituality in the Western World. Thorsons Publishers. 1994. ISBN 978-1-85538-161-2.
- Thorsons Principles of Paganism. Thorsons Publishers. 1996. ISBN 978-1-85538-507-8.
- Celtic Wisdom: Seasonal Festivals and Rituals. Sterling Pub. 1998. ISBN 978-0-8069-7056-1.
- Thorsons Principles of Jungian Spirituality: The Only Instruction You'll Ever Need. Thorsons. 1998. ISBN 978-0-7225-3578-3.
- Your Dark Side: How to Turn your Inner Negativity into Positive Energy. HarperCollins. 2001. ISBN 0-7225-3877-4. With co-author Christopher Crowley.
- The Goddess Book of Days. Pavilion Books. 2003. ISBN 978-1-84333-623-5.
- Wild Once: Awaken the Magic Within. Unleash True Power. Penguin. 2022. ISBN 978-1-529-12489-7.

=== Articles ===
- Crowley, V. (1998). "Wicca as Nature Religion". In Pearson, J.; Roberts, R.; Samuel, G. (eds.). Nature Religion Today: Paganism in the Modern World. pp. 170–179. ISBN 978-0-7486-1057-0.
- Crowley, V. (12 January 2002). Carl Jung and the Development of Contemporary Paganism. The Development of Paganism: History, Influences and Contexts, 1880-2002. The Open University Religious Studies Research Group Belief Beyond Boundaries.
- Crowley, V. (2017). "Jungian Feminists". In Leeming, D. (ed.). Encyclopedia of Psychology and Religion. Berlin, Heidelberg: Springer. pp. 1–4. doi:10.1007/978-3-642-27771-9_200080-1. ISBN 978-3-642-27771-9.
- Crowley, Vivianne (14 March 2024). "How To Celebrate The Spring Equinox, According To A Wiccan High Priestess". Vogue.
