= Lady Sheba =

Jessie Wicker Bell or Lady Sheba (July 18, 1920 – 2002) was an American writer on Celtic Wicca and founder of the American Order of the Brotherhood of the Wicca with the aim to unite all practitioners of Wicca (covens, groups, traditions).

== Early life and education ==
Born in Kentucky, Bell's family introduced her to their Celtic heritage; her grandmother told her stories about leprechauns and fairies.

== Career ==
In 1971, Lady Sheba published The Book of Shadows and founded the American Order of the Brotherhood of the Wicca, an offshoot of Gardnerian Wicca. The book was controversial, as it revealed information that other Wiccans tended to keep secret. Lady Sheba appointed herself high priestess of the order and worked to expand its influence. Other covens, both within and outside the United States, were formed under its umbrella, and she began referring to herself as Witch Queen over the new groups. Many Wiccans objected to her use of the title. By 1972, Lady Sheba estimated the American population of witches at over 100,000, and the Star Tribune called her "the head of all witches in the United States".

== Publications ==
- The Book of Shadows. Llewellyn Publications. 1971. ISBN 978-0875420752.
- The Grimoire of Lady Sheba. Llewellyn Publications. 1972. ISBN 978-0875420769.
