= Wiccan Laws =

Ancient laws governing the practice of Covens

The Wiccan Laws, also called the Craft Laws, the Old Laws, the Ardanes (or Ordains) or simply The Laws are, according to claims made by Gerald Gardner in the 1950s, ancient laws governing the practice of Covens, passed from initiate to initiate as part of the Book of Shadows.

The laws were first revealed by Gardner to other members of the Craft in 1957, after a disagreement arose over Gardner's continued interviews with the media despite his own rules of secrecy. The laws were originally unnumbered, and used the spelling wica, rather than Wicca or Wiccan.

The Laws contain correctly used archaic language. However, they mix modern and archaic phrases. The Laws do not appear in earlier known Wiccan documents, including Gardner's Ye bok of Ye Art Magical, Text A or B, or in any of Doreen Valiente’s notebooks including one commonly referred to as Text C. The Laws have several anachronisms and refer to the threat of being burnt for witchcraft even though this did not happen in England or Wales, where witches were hanged during the witch hunts. Parts also seemed suspiciously similar to extracts from Gardner's books. If Gardner did forge the Laws, this would have implications for earlier aspects of Wiccan history.

To Gardner's original 30 Laws Alexandrian Wicca added another 130. This much larger set of Laws was first published in King of the Witches by June Johns in 1969, and later, in slightly altered form, in both The Book of Shadows (1971) and The Grimoire of Lady Sheba (1972) by Lady Sheba (Jessie Wicker Bell). In these two books, Bell also published the bulk of the Wiccan Book of Shadows, introducing to the general public for the first time the possibility of practicing Wiccan-style ritual. The Laws are sometimes known as Lady Sheba's Laws or 161 Rules of the Witch (her title for them).

In 1979 a Council of Elders at a festival in America produced a set of heavily revised Laws which made them more acceptable to modern Wiccans.
