= Craft name =

Fairies

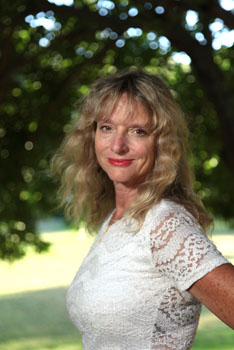
Wiccan priestess, witch and author Cheri Lesh's craft name is Cerridwen Fallingstar.

A craft name, also referred to as a magical name, is a secondary religious name often adopted by practitioners of Wicca and other forms of Neopagan witchcraft or magic. Craft names may be adopted as a means of protecting one's privacy (especially for those who are "in the broom closet"), as an expression of religious devotion, or as a part of an initiation ritual. It may also be used as a protective method, as it is believed by some that one's "true name" can be used to identify that person for the purpose of magical activities (predominantly curses).

== Pseudonym ==
The idea of using an alternate name as an attempt to develop a different persona is not restricted to Neopagans: Samuel Clemens' adoption of the name Mark Twain has been described as the adoption of a magical name. Before the emergence of Neopaganism similar pseudonyms appear to have been used by writers of grimoires such as The Book of Abramelin, attributed to the Rabbi Yaakov Moelin.

== Uses ==
In traditional forms of Wicca, such as Gardnerian or Alexandrian, Craft names are typically adopted primarily out of regard for their symbolism. Craft names may be carefully guarded and used only with members of one's own coven. Some Wiccans will use two different Craft names, one with the general public (or the Neopagan community) and one with their covenmates. Wiccans who choose to conceal their religion to avoid religious discrimination may use a craft name when speaking to the press. The use of Craft names as online handles for Neopaganism- or Wicca-related groups and discussions has become increasingly common.

The use (or over-use) of "outer court" Craft names (to be used outside of initiates-only or "inner-court" settings) is the subject of some debate. Some treat the choosing of a name as a solemn and significant event while others regard the practice as an affectation to be ridiculed.

== Craft names of well-known individuals ==
Craft names of some famous Wiccans and other Neopagan witches include:

- Dafo – the initiator of Gerald Gardner, thought to be Edith Woodford-Grimes.
- Scire – a.k.a. Gerald Gardner.
- Ameth – a.k.a. Doreen Valiente, Gardner's first High Priestess.
- Dayonis – a.k.a. Thelma Capel who replaced Ameth as Gardner's High Priestess.
- Thelema – a.k.a. Patricia Crowther.
- Artemis – a.k.a. Eleanor Bone.
- Tanith – a.k.a. Lois Bourne.
- Robert – a.k.a. Fred Lamond.
- Olwen and Loic – a.k.a. Monique and Campbell 'Scotty' Wilson.
- Robat – a.k.a. Raymond Buckland, initiated by Olwen and responsible for providing a bridge for Wicca between the UK and USA.
- Rowen – a.k.a. Rosemary Buckland, high priestess descended from Olwen, and Raymond Buckland's ex-wife
- Verbius – a.k.a. Alex Sanders.
- Aradia – a.k.a. Phyllis Curott, the story of the adoption of her craft name is told in her autobiographical Book of Shadows (1998)
- Silver RavenWolf – a.k.a. Jenine E. Trayer.
- Zsuzsanna Budapest – a.k.a. Zsuzsanna Emese Mokcsay.
- Starhawk – a.k.a. Miriam Simos.
- Cerridwen Fallingstar – a.k.a. Cheri Lesh.
- Lady Gwen Thompson – a.k.a. Phyllis Thompson (née Healy)

== See also ==
- Pseudonym
- Magical motto
- Nomen mysticum
- Religious name
