= Book of Shadows =

Type of book or text found in Wicca

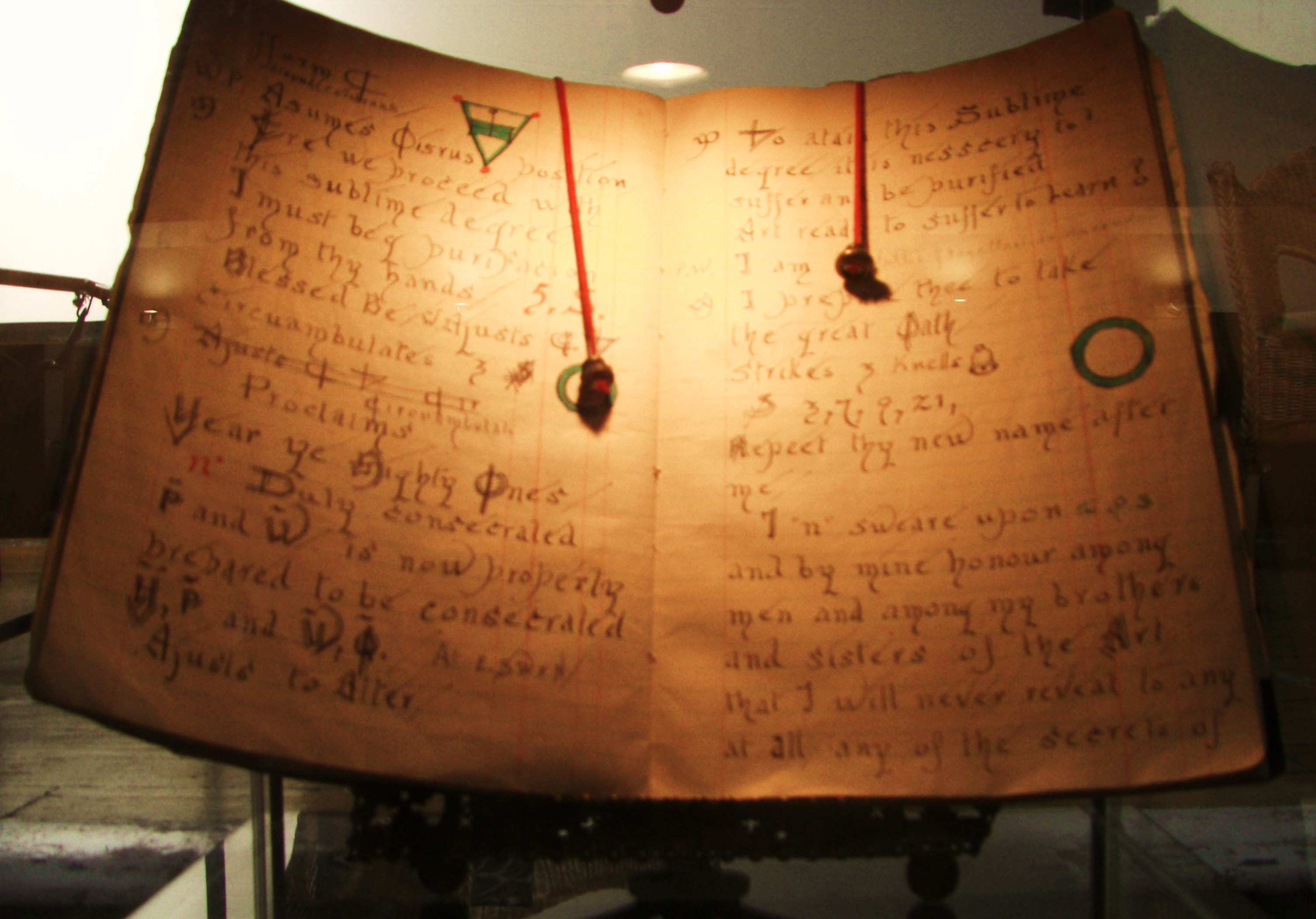
One of Gerald Gardner's earliest Books of Shadows

A Book of Shadows is a book containing religious text and instructions for magical rituals found within the Neopagan religion of Wicca.

== Overview ==
Since its conception, it has made its way into many pagan practices and paths. The most famous Book of Shadows was created by the pioneering English Wiccan Gerald Gardner sometime in the late 1940s or early 1950s, and which he utilised first in his Bricket Wood coven and then in other covens which he founded in following decades. The Book of Shadows is also used by other Wiccan traditions, such as Alexandrian Wicca and Mohsianism, and with the rise of books teaching people how to begin following non-initiatory Wicca in the 1970s onward, the idea of the Book of Shadows was then further propagated amongst solitary practitioners unconnected to earlier, initiatory traditions.

Initially, when Wicca was still dominated by covens, "only one copy [of the Book] existed for an entire coven, kept by the high priestess or high priest. That rule has proved unfeasible, and it is [now] commonplace for all Witches to have their own copies." In the various traditions that make up British Traditional Wicca, copies of the original Book composed by Gerald Gardner with the aid of his High Priestess Doreen Valiente, along with alterations and additions that have been made since then, is followed by adherents. Though originally a secret text only given to initiates of Wicca, many initiate and non-initiates alike have gone on to print various Books of Shadows. These figures include Charles Cardell, Lady Sheba, and Janet and Stewart Farrar to name a few. In other Wiccan traditions and amongst a number of solitary practitioners, alternate versions of the Book of Shadows have been written, which are independent of Gardner's original.

Numerous associations and traditions have since grown up around the Book of Shadows. Traditionally, "a Witch's book of shadows is destroyed upon death." It can be an experimental practice, everyday ritual works, or a record of magic. This is also a book of inspiration and can be used in future rituals.

The concept of the Book of Shadows has subsequently appeared in popular culture, for instance being used in the American television series Charmed, which popularised the Book of Shadows.

== History ==
=== Origins ===
Gerald Gardner, the "father of Wicca", first introduced the Book of Shadows to people that he had initiated into the craft through his Bricket Wood coven in the 1950s. He claimed that it was a personal cookbook of spells that have worked for the owner; they could copy from his own book and add material as they saw fit. He said that the practice of Witches keeping such a book was ancient, and was practised by the Witch-cult throughout history. According to tradition, Gardner claimed that the Book of Shadows was burned after a person died, so that it would not be discovered that they had been a witch.

Gerald Gardner omitted mention the "Book of Shadows" in his 1949 historical novel High Magic's Aid, which has its subject matter medieval witchcraft. High Priestess Doreen Valiente claimed that this was because at the time, Gardner had not yet conceived of the idea, and only invented it after writing his novel.

Valiente noted that Gardner found the term "Book of Shadows" from Volume I, Number 3 of the quarterly publication The Occult Observer, published in 1949]. (Its editor, Michael Houghton, had founded the Atlantis Bookshop.) She claimed that issue contained an ad for Gardner'sHigh Magic's Aid opposite the first part of a multi-part article entitled "The Book of Shadows" written by the palmist Mir Bashir. No ad for Gardner's book actually appears in the publication. Bashir's article concerned an allegedly ancient Sanskrit divination manual which explained how to make predictions based upon the length of a person's shadow. Valiente theorised that Gardner adopted this term for his Witches' grimoire. She maintained that, "It was a good name, and it is a good name still, wherever Gardner found it".

A typescript from a page of Ye Booke of Ye Art Magical

A leather=bound manuscript written in Gardner's handwriting that was titled Ye Bok of Ye Art Magical was later found amongst his papers from the Museum after his death by Aidan Kelly and was later obtained by Richard and Tamarra James of the Wiccan Church of Canada. It appeared to be a first draft of Gardner's Book of Shadows, and featured sections based upon the rituals of Ordo Templi Orientis which had been devised by the occultist Aleister Crowley. Gardner had gained access to these rituals in 1946, when he had purchased a charter from Crowley giving him permission to perform the OTO rituals.

Some people have taken this as evidence that Gardner invented the idea of a Witches' Grimoire, perhaps sometime between 1946 (when he finished High Magic's Aid), and 1949, and had named it Ye Bok of Ye Art Magical. In 1949, he had renamed it to the Book of Shadows, and soon began to make use of it with his Bricket Wood Coven.

Adding weight to the evidence indicating Gardner invented the Book was that other Neo-pagan witches of the time, such as Robert Cochrane, never made use of such a book.

=== Valiente's rewriting ===
In 1953, Doreen Valiente joined Gardner's Bricket Wood coven, and soon rose to become its High Priestess. She noticed how much of the material in his Book of Shadows was taken not from ancient sources as Gardner had initially claimed, but from the works of the occultist Aleister Crowley, from Aradia, or the Gospel of the Witches, from the Key of Solomon and also from the rituals of Freemasonry. She confronted Gardner with this, who admitted that the text he had received from the New Forest coven had been fragmentary and he had had to fill much of it using various sources. He also stated that "well, if you think you can do any better, go ahead", and Valiente thought that she could, later stating that:

I accepted the challenge and set out to rewrite the Book of Shadows, cutting out the Crowleyanity as much as I could and trying to bring it back to what I felt was, if not so elaborate as Crowley's phraseology, at least our own and in our own words.

Valiente rewrote much of it, cutting out a lot of sections that had come from Crowley (whose negative reputation she feared), though retaining parts that originated with Aradia, or the Gospel of the Witches, which she felt was genuine witchcraft practice. Valiente dramatically rewrote sections such as the Charge of the Goddess and also wrote several poems for the book, such as The Witches Rune. She also helped to create a poem to include the Wiccan Rede within it.

Valiente also noticed that a chant in one ritual in the book was based upon the poem "A Tree Song" from Puck of Pook's Hill by Rudyard Kipling, which she had enjoyed as a child. The chant in question stated that:

Oh, do not tell the priest our plight,
Or he would call it sin;
But - we have been in the woods all night,
A-conjuring summer in !
And we bring you news by word of mouth -
Good news for cattle and corn -
Now is the Sun come up from the South,
With Oak, and Ash, and Thorn!

(These eight lines are exactly the final stanza of "A Tree Song".)

This version of the ritual, written by both Gardner and Valiente, but containing sections adopted from various sources, such as Aleister Crowley, Aradia, or the Gospel of the Witches, and even Rudyard Kipling, went on to become the traditional text for Gardnerian Wicca.

== In British Traditional Wicca ==
In forms of British Traditional Wicca, which include Gardnerian Wicca, Alexandrian Wicca and Algard Wicca, the Book of Shadows used by adherents is based upon that written by Gardner and Valiente.

Although his own book had been put together with the help of Doreen Valiente and included material from a variety of modern sources, (notably from Aradia, or the Gospel of the Witches and the writings of Aleister Crowley) it also included sections written in an antique (or mock-antique) style, including advice for witches brought to trial and tortured. Gardner claimed that these sections were genuinely historical in origin, and that witches had not been allowed to write anything down until recently, to avoid incrimination; when at last Books of Shadows were allowed, the rituals and spells had to be written in a jumbled manner to prevent any non-initiate from using them. More recent scholars however have doubted their authenticity.

It seems likely that Gardner told his three subsequent initiatory lines that the book should be copied word for word, and Wiccans descended from Eleanor Bone, Patricia Crowther and Monique Wilson have widely believed that the book was of ancient provenance.

=== Contemporary usage ===
There sometimes exist two Books of Shadows kept by more traditional Wiccans, one being a coven book of core rituals and practises which remains unchanged and from which new initiates copy, and the second, intended for personal use, which differs from witch to witch and contains magical material collected by the initiate, such as astrology, herbal lore, and information regarding divination.

=== Publication ===
After Gardner's death, his rival, Charles Cardell, published much of the material from the Gardnerian Book of Shadows. In the 1970s, the then Alexandrians Janet Farrar and Stewart Farrar decided, with the consent of Doreen Valiente, that much of the Gardnerian book should be published in its true form. Much of it was published by the Farrars in their 1984 book The Witches' Way.

== In Eclectic Wicca ==
In non-traditional or "eclectic" forms of Wiccan or Neo-pagan practice, the term Book of Shadows is more often used to describe a personal journal, rather than a traditional text. This journal records rituals, spells, and their results, as well as other magical information. This can be either an individual or coven text, and is not normally passed from teacher to student. In many cases, this kind of Book of Shadows is an electronic document (disk or website) instead of a hand-written one. Some reserve the Book of Shadows for recording spells and keep a separate book, sometimes called the "Book of Mirrors", to contain thoughts, feelings and experiences.

== Other traditions ==
Not all traditions of Wicca utilize the term "Book of Shadows". In Seax-Wica, a tradition founded by Raymond Buckland, the Book of Shadows is called "The Tree", and in Devotional Wicca, the book is titled "The Book of Ways"; many traditions refer to their Books of Shadows as simply "The Book".

== In popular culture ==
The television fantasy series Charmed features a fictional Book of Shadows which contains spells and arcane law, and has a supernatural ability to defend itself from harm. In the 1996 film The Craft, which some critics saw as a major influence on the series Charmed, the Book of Shadows was referred to as an object in which a witch keeps her "power thoughts".

The 2000 sequel to The Blair Witch Project was titled Book of Shadows: Blair Witch 2 and featured a Wiccan character, despite there being no mention of a "Book of Shadows", during the film. Its teaser trailer, reveals the "Book of Shadows" itself but never appeared in the film. In the trailer, the "Book of Shadows" was found at the woods of Black Hills, until she was attacked by an unknown man. The title was seen as an attempt to capitalise on the Charmed series' established market.

In the 2011 television series The Secret Circle, each family is shown to have their own "Book of Shadows", with each book containing unique spells. As the book is passed down from generation to generation, each generation appears to write their own spells or notes, as indicated by Cassie's recognition of her mother's handwriting in her own family's "Book of Shadows".

The Japanese horror adventure game Corpse Party: Book of Shadows deals with the eponymous book during its final chapter. It returns in Corpse Party: Blood Drive where it becomes a key element of the story.

In the Australian television series Nowhere Boys two characters are known to possess a Book of Shadows. One being one of the protagonists, Felix Ferne, and one being an antagonist, Alice Hartley. Felix's book was first thought to be his diary as he tried to hide its true existence from his friends, and Alice's book was thought to be her sister's.

In the fifth edition of roleplaying game Dungeons & Dragons, members of the warlock class can gain a Book of Shadows, which enables them to learn extra spells and rituals regardless of whether or not such magic is ordinarily accessible through the warlock class.

In the roguelike video game Binding of Isaac, the Book of Shadows is featured as an active item the player can find.

== See also ==
- Grimoire
- Universal Eclectic Wicca
