= New Reformed Orthodox Order of the Golden Dawn =

- Nickname: NROOGD
- Pronunciation: "nuh-roog'd"
- Formation: 1967; 59 years ago
- Founded at: San Francisco Bay Area

The New Reformed Orthodox Order of the Golden Dawn (abbreviated NROOGD, commonly pronounced "nuh-roog'd") is a Wiccan tradition founded in 1967. Despite its name, has little or nothing to do with the original Hermetic Order of the Golden Dawn.

== History ==
The NROOGD Tradition of the Craft originated in 1967 with a group of friends (including e.l.f. Silverlocke, Glen Turner, Judy Greenwood, and Aidan Kelly). e.l.f. Silverlocke was taking a class at San Francisco State College, which gave her the assignment of creating and leading a ritual. She came up with the idea of recreating a Witches' Sabbath, using published sources from Robert Graves, Margaret Murray and Gerald Gardner, a ritual was composed that has served as the basis of NROOGD practice ever since. After repeat performances of this rite yielded results on a number of occasions, a decision was made to create a group identity and train others in its performance.

The name New Reformed Orthodox Order of the Golden Dawn was coined since it was a wholly new Tradition, it was Orthodox since it took its beliefs from the ancients, and it was a Magical Order as was the Hermetic Order of the Golden Dawn. They considered themselves in some sense the spiritual and magical successors of the Golden Dawn. Bonewits considers NROOGD to be the quintessential (and probably the first) "California Eclectic" Wiccan Tradition, near the "liberal/heterodox" end of his Wiccan spectrum of "orthodoxy/heterodoxy."

The mother circle of NROOGD hived off daughter and granddaughter covens, which trace an unbroken line of initiation and share a common liturgy.

== Practices ==
Covens are autonomous and recognize one another's initiates. The Tradition worships a triply aspected Goddess and various forms of the God derived from ancient Greek and British mythology.

Coven Esbats are usually held skyclad, (Some covens do choose to work robed.) and focus on the working of ethical magic and the celebration of the divinity of each participant.

In 1976, the governing body of the NROOGD called the Red Cord Council was dissolved, and a consensus decision to call the Order a Tradition was made. Since that time, those groups tracing their lines of initiation back to a member of the original group and who share certain forms of liturgy consider themselves part of the NROOGD tradition.

The core NROOGD ritual, is made of poetry and charms, and begins with a line dance in the form of a spiral inwards and then outwards, representing death and rebirth. Central to the public face of the Tradition is the celebration of the solar cycle, as observed through public Sabbats.

NROOGD public ritual is often known for a particularly poetic style of conjuration, the invocation of the Lord and the Lady (in her triple aspect), and the use of the Spiral Dance. Some have called NROOGD a "bardic" Tradition, because of its strong emphasis on poetic expression and the power of words and song.

Initially, the ritual performance required three priestesses and one priest, but now this form is usually reserved for large public rituals; the smaller coven meetings typically require only one of each. Although magical workings vary in form and content, they often include enchantments and simple verse. Mythic enactments corresponding to a needed transformation may also be performed.

NROOGD continues to hold large public ritual celebrations at each of the eight Sabbats for the benefit of the greater Pagan community, and periodic meetings of area covens are held to decide responsibilities for the coming year.

Esbats in NROOGD covens usually focus on the working of magic, or on celebration of the divinity of each participant, recognizing and greeting the force of a usually triply aspected Goddess and God. The magical workings vary in form and content, but often include charms and simple poetry. Poetic ritual writing is much encouraged by the tradition. Mythic enactments corresponding to a needed transformation may also be performed.

Sharing food and drink (called a Love Feast) usually wraps up the agenda, as all prepare themselves to reenter their daily reality. Gods, Demigods, or other spirits at each of the cardinal directions serve as Guardians of the Circle and of the Elements, and are usually different for each coven. Names of the Gods tend to be idiosyncratic to each group and some covens keep them secret nowadays.

During the late 1980s and 1990s, younger members expanded inherited liturgy by writing new poetry and songs for new rituals. This continues in the Tradition today. NROOGD encourages creative expression, and these new writings serve to keep the Tradition alive.

NROOGD covens in the San Francisco Bay Area cooperate to present public (clothed) ritual celebrations on most of the Sabbats, for the benefit of the greater Pagan community. Often in the fall, NROOGD enacts a ritual at the seaside inspired by and commemorating the Greater Eleusinian Mysteries of the Hellenic world.

== Geography ==
NROOGD member covens are primarily based in the San Francisco Bay Area, yet practitioners are found all over the State of California, The Southwest, the Pacific Northwest, the East Coast, Canada and the UK. There is neither central authority nor spokesperson for the tradition.

== Moral code ==
NROOGD Laws of the Craft:

- An it harm none, do as ye will.
- You may not alter another's life/karma without his or her permission.
- Solve the problem, no more, no less.
- You must help your brothers and sisters in the Craft as best you can.
- If you stick your hand in a flame, you'll get burned.

== See also ==
- Neopagan witchcraft
- Wiccan organisation
