= Edith Woodford-Grimes =

English Wiccan (1887–1975)

Edith Rose Woodford-Grimes
- Woodford-Grimes in 1917.
- Born: 18 December 1887; Malton, Yorkshire, England
- Died: 1975 (aged 87–88)
- Occupations: Elocution teacher; Wiccan initiate
- Spouse: Samuel William Woodford Grimes
- Children: Rosanne Woodford-Grimes
- Parent(s): William Henry Wray; Caroline Wray

Edith Rose Woodford-Grimes (1887–1975) was an English Wiccan who achieved recognition as one of the faith's earliest known adherents. She had been a member of the New Forest coven which met during the late 1930s and early 1940s, and through this became a friend and working partner of Gerald Gardner, who would go on to found the Gardnerian tradition with her help. Widely known under the nickname of Dafo, Woodford-Grimes' involvement in the Craft had largely been kept a secret until it was revealed in the late 1990s, and her role in the history of Wicca was subsequently investigated by historians.

The reason for Woodford-Grimes' adoption of the pseudonym Dafo is unknown, with the researcher Philip Heselton believing that it was not her craft name but a nickname given to her by Gardner, possibly being based upon his experiences in eastern Asia, where it had been used to refer to certain statues of the Buddha.

== Biography ==
=== Early life: 1887–1938 ===
Woodford-Grimes was born as Edith Rose Wray in a house in Malton, Yorkshire, on 18 December 1887. Her father, William Henry Wray, was an implement maker at the local waterworks, whilst her mother was Caroline Wray, née Harrison. Whilst much is still not known about her early life, she became a teacher, specialising in English, Drama and Music, in later years becoming an associate of the London College of Music and the London Academy of Music.

On 16 June 1920, she married Samuel William Woodford Grimes, an Englishman who had been born in Bangalore, India in 1880, who at the time was working as a clerk in the War Pensions Office in Southampton. Subsequently, she took his surname of Grimes, and decided to turn it into a double-barrelled surname by adding one of his middle names, Woodford, to it. As researcher Philip Heselton later remarked, "This may have been pure snobbery, or she may have felt that it sounded more elegant and exclusive – more befitting a teacher of elocution." Soon after the marriage, the couple moved to a newly constructed house, 67 Osborne Road, which was found in the Portswood suburb of Southampton in southern England. Then, on 30 June 1921, Edith and Samuel's first and only child, Rosanne, was born, but within a few years Edith returned to work, as by 1924 she had gained employment once more as a tutor in English and Dramatic Literature at various student groups, something she would continue until 1934, and from 1924 she had also begun teaching elocution and dramatic art at evening classes for the Southampton Education Authority.

Eventually, the relationship between the couple broke down, and although they remained married (divorce being hard to acquire at the time), they separated. Woodford-Grimes decided to move away from Southampton, and so relocated to Christchurch, Hampshire by 1938. Here she purchased a newly built bungalow in Dennistoun Avenue, Somerford, and began working as a private teacher of elocution and dramatic art. It was at her new home in Christchurch that she became involved in a local esoteric group, the Rosicrucian Order Crotona Fellowship. Becoming increasingly interested in their philosophies and practices, she decided to name her bungalow "Theano", which had been the name of the wife of the ancient Greek philosopher Pythagoras. Woodford-Grimes herself had performed the role of Theano in a play about Pythagoras that the Crotona Fellowship had put on, and which had been written by the group's leader, George Alexander Sullivan.

=== Involvement with Wicca: 1939– ===
It was through the Rosicrucian Order Crotona Fellowship that Woodford-Grimes likely met members of another local esoteric group, the New Forest coven, which was one of the earliest recorded Wiccan covens to exist. Its members considered themselves the continuation of the historical Witch-Cult, an ancient religion that the anthropologist Margaret Murray had described in several books published in the 1920s and 1930s. Nonetheless, subsequent investigation and research by historians has disputed that the Witch-Cult had ever existed, and as such it appears that the New Forest coven were in fact a group who had been founded in the early 1930s.

Following this marriage, Rosanne and her new husband moved into Woodford-Grimes' bungalow, Theano, whilst she herself relocated once more to Avenue Cottage in Walkford, the village adjacent to Highcliffe, where Gardner and his wife Donna lived.

Gardner, discussing the publication of his two books on witchcraft, mentions that he felt obliged to have the permission of the witches he knew to do so. It is now widely assumed that this was a reference to 'Dafo', who appears to have been a great deal more publicity-shy than Gardner was.

In the late 1940s, Gerald Gardner founded the Bricket Wood coven, and was joined by Dafo. However, she left the coven in 1952, fearing Gardner's growing publicity would expose her.

In winter 1952 Gardner invited Doreen Valiente, a prospective witch, to meet him and Dafo at her house. They met here on several occasions, and on Midsummer 1953 Gardner initiated Valiente into the craft at Dafo's home. The three of them then set off to Stonehenge, where they watched the Druids performing a ritual.

By 1954, Dafo had started living with a strictly Christian niece, who disapproved of occultism and witchcraft. Dafo therefore kept her past involvement with witchcraft secret from her family. In 1958, three separate groups of witches approached her, asking for her to verify Gardner's claims. Dafo did not respond to two of these, and denied having any involvement other than a theoretical interest in the craft to the third.

The historian Ronald Hutton, in his 1999 book The Triumph of the Moon: A History of Modern Pagan Witchcraft, said that he had not researched into Dafo's past, because she would not have wanted such a thing, as most of her family were strict Christians.

== Legacy ==
Woodford-Grimes has left an enduring legacy in the Wiccan and greater Neopagan community who recognise her as one of the earliest known adherents of her faith. Because she never became publicly known in her lifetime, and the fact that she intentionally denied her involvement in the Craft towards the end of her life, Woodford-Grimes' identity would not be publicly known until several decades after her death. Nonetheless, her involvement in the New Forest coven under her pseudonym of Dafo was known, and was occasionally featured in published sources: one of the earliest of these was in June Johns' 1969 biography of Alex Sanders, King of the Witches, in which she incorrectly spelled the pseudonym as "Daffo".

After her identity was revealed, she became well known in Wiccan circles, for instance the Neopagan bard Francis Cameron delivered a prose interpretation of her life and involvement with the Craft, written as if from her own point of view, entitled "Dafo's Tale", at The Charge of the Goddess conference 2010, held at Conway Hall in London.
