= Mir Bashir (palmist) =

Clairvoyant and palmist

- Born: 1907 (age 118–119); British India
- Occupation: Astrologer

Mir Bashir (Urdu میر بشیر) was a famous Kashmiri palmist born in 1907 in British India. Mir Bashir moved to England in 1948 and was the leading palmist of London at that time. During his research on palmistry, he collaborated with physicians and criminologists, maintaining a library of over fifty thousand handprints. He wrote the book How to Read Hands in 1955. In the Urdu language, his book's name is Ramoz-i-dust shunasi. He also wrote many articles in newspapers.
