= Charge of the Goddess =

Inspirational text often used in the Wiccan religion

The Charge of the Goddess (or Charge of the Star Goddess) is an inspirational text often used in the neopagan religion of Wicca. The Charge of the Goddess is recited during most rituals in which the Wiccan priest/priestess is expected to represent, and/or embody, the Goddess within the sacred circle, and is often spoken by the High Priest/Priestess after the ritual of Drawing Down the Moon.

The Charge is the promise of the Goddess (who is embodied by the high priestess) to all witches that she will teach and guide them. It has been called "perhaps the most important single theological document in the neo-Pagan movement". It is used not only in Wicca, but as part of the foundational documents of the Reclaiming tradition of witchcraft co-founded by Starhawk.

Several versions of the Charge exist, though they all have the same basic premise, that of a set of instructions given by the Great Goddess to her worshippers. The earliest version is that compiled by Gerald Gardner. This version, titled "Leviter Veslis" or "Lift Up the Veil", includes material paraphrased from works by Aleister Crowley, primarily from Liber AL (The Book of the Law, particularly from Ch 1, spoken by Nuit, the Star Goddess), and from Liber LXV (The Book of the Heart Girt with a Serpent) and from Crowley's essay "The Law of Liberty", thus linking modern Wicca to the cosmology and revelations of Thelema. It has been shown that Gerald Gardner's book collection included a copy of Crowley's The Blue Equinox (1919) which includes all of the Crowley quotations transferred by Gardner to the Charge of the Goddess.

There are also two versions written by Doreen Valiente in the mid-1950s, after her 1953 Wiccan initiation. The first was a poetic paraphrase which eliminated almost all the material derived from Leland and Crowley. The second was a prose version which is contained within the traditional Gardnerian Book of Shadows and more closely resembles Gardner's "Leviter Veslis" version of 1949.

Several different versions of a Wiccan Charge of the God have since been created to mirror and accompany the Charge of the Goddess.

== Themes ==
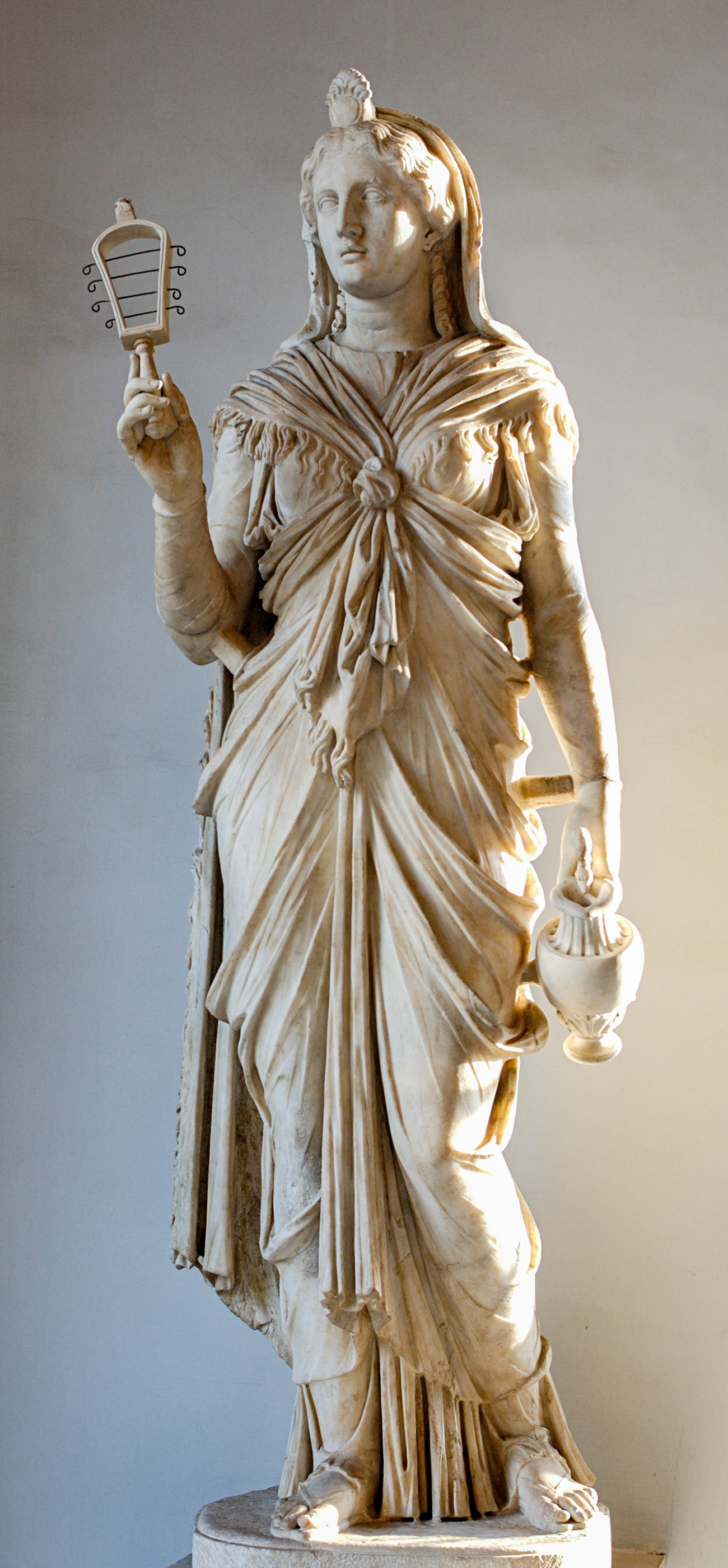
The goddess Isis, holding a sistrum and oinochoe.

The opening paragraph names a collection of goddesses, some derived from Greek or Roman mythology, others from Celtic or Arthurian legends, affirming a belief that these various figures represent a single Great Mother:

Listen to the words of the Great Mother, who was of old also called Artemis; Astarte; Diana; Melusine; Aphrodite; Cerridwen; Dana; Arianrhod; Isis; Bride; and by many other names.

— Doreen Valiente, Charge of the Goddess

This theme echoes the ancient Roman belief that the Goddess Isis was known by ten thousand names and also that the Goddess still worshipped today by Wiccans and other neopagans is known under many guises but is in fact one universal divinity.

The second paragraph is largely derived and paraphrased from the words that Aradia, the messianic daughter of Diana, speaks to her followers in Charles Godfrey Leland's 1899 book Aradia, or the Gospel of the Witches (London: David Nutt; various reprints). The third paragraph is largely written by Doreen Valiente, with a significant content of phrases loosely from The Book of the Law and The Book of the Heart Girt with the Serpent by Aleister Crowley.

The charge affirms that all acts of love and pleasure are sacred to the Goddess, e.g.:

Let my worship be within the heart that rejoiceth, for behold: all acts of love and pleasure are my rituals. And therefore let there be beauty and strength, power and compassion, honour and humility, mirth and reverence within you.

— Doreen Valiente, Charge of the Goddess

== History ==
=== Ancient precedents ===
In book eleven, chapter 47 of Apuleius's The Golden Ass, Isis delivers what Ceisiwr Serith calls "essentially a charge of a goddess". This is rather different from the modern version known in Wicca, though they have the same premise, that of the rules given by a great Mother Goddess to her faithful.

The Charge of the Goddess is also known under the title Leviter Veslis. This has been identified by the historian Ronald Hutton, cited in an article by Roger Dearnsley "The Influence of Aleister Crowley on Ye Bok of Ye Art Magical, as a piece of medieval ecclesiastical Latin used to mean "lifting the veil." However, Hutton's interpretation does not reflect the Latin grammar as it currently stands. It may represent Gardner's attempt to write Levetur Velis, which has the literal meaning of "Let the veil be lifted." This expression would, by coincidence or design, grammatically echo the famous fiat lux (Gen. 1:3) of the Latin Vulgate.

=== Origins ===
The earliest known Wiccan version is found in a document dating from the late 1940s, Gerald Gardner's ritual notebook titled Ye Bok of Ye Art Magical. The oldest identifiable source contained in this version is the final line, which is traceable to the 17th-century Centrum Naturae Concentratum of Alipili (or Ali Puli). This version also draws extensively from Charles Godfrey Leland's Aradia, or the Gospel of the Witches (1899) and other modern sources, particularly from the works of Aleister Crowley.

It is believed to have been compiled by Gerald Gardner or possibly another member of the New Forest coven. Gardner intended his version to be a theological statement justifying the Gardnerian sequence of initiations. Like the Charge found in Freemasonry, where the charge is a set of instructions read to a candidate standing in a temple, the Charge of the Goddess was intended to be read immediately before an initiation.

Valiente felt that the influence of Crowley on the Charge was too obvious, and she did not want "the Craft" (a common term for Wicca) associated with Crowley. Gardner invited her to rewrite the Charge. She proceeded to do so, her first version being into verse.

The initial verse version by Doreen Valiente consisted of eight verses, the second of which was:

Bow before My spirit bright
Aphrodite, Arianrhod
Lover of the Hornéd God
Queen of witchery and night

Valiente was unhappy with this version, saying that "people seemed to have some difficulty with this, because of the various goddess-names which they found hard to pronounce", and so she rewrote it as a prose version, much of which differs from her initial version, and is more akin to Gardner's version. This prose version has since been modified and reproduced widely by other authors.
