= Philip Heselton =

British author

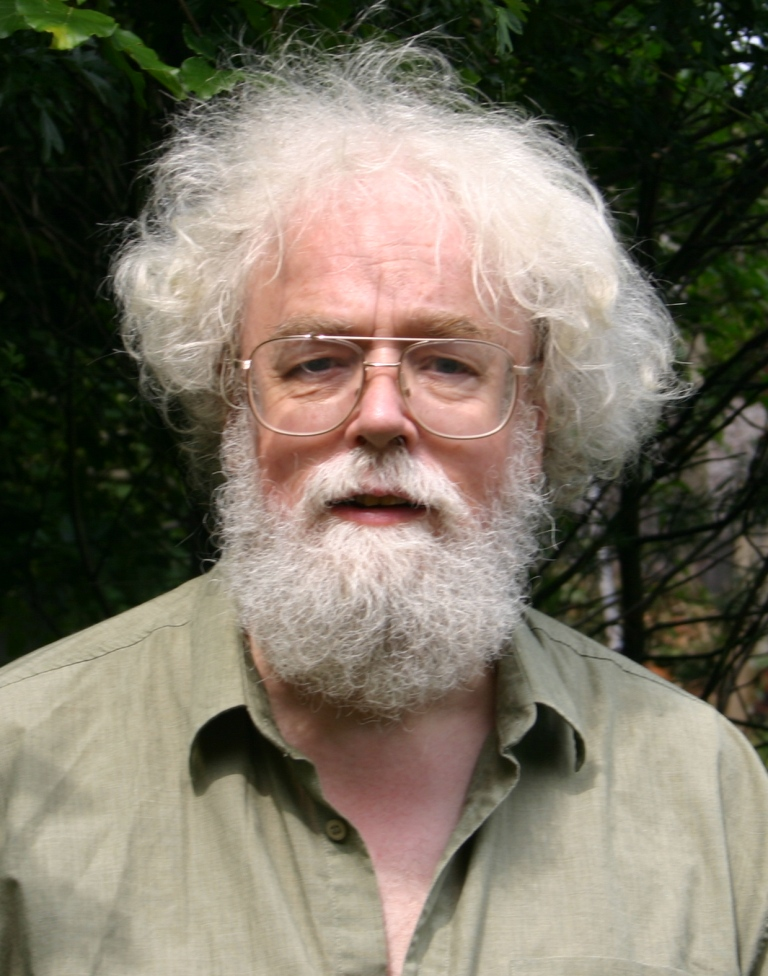
- Heselton in 2005
- Born: 1946 (age 79–80)
- Occupations: Retired planning officer, author
- Writing career
- Period: 1980s onwards
- Genre: Factual/historical works
- Subjects: Earth mysteries, Wicca

Philip Heselton (born 1946) is a retired British conservation officer, a Wiccan initiate, and a writer on the subjects of Wicca, Paganism, and Earth mysteries. He is best known for two books, Wiccan Roots: Gerald Gardner and the Modern Witchcraft Revival and Gerald Gardner and the Cauldron of Inspiration, which gather historical evidence surrounding the New Forest coven and the origins of Gardnerian Wicca.

In his non-literary life his interest in landscape led to a degree in Geography and a career in Town and Country Planning; eventually he became a Conservation Officer for Hull City Council before his retirement in 1997.

== 1960s–1970s: Ley hunting ==
Heselton has been described by Allen Watkins, son of Alfred Watkins, as the person who "...led the post-war revival of academic and practical interest in Leys". In 1962, Heselton and others collaborated to form the Ley Hunters' Club, a revival of Alfred Watkins' Straight Track Club. The Ley Hunters worked on a hypothesis that Ley lines were not just prehistoric trackways, but were in some way connected with UFOs. Heselton edited the first issues of the club's journal, The Ley Hunter , in 1965–66 and frequently contributed articles to the journal when it reappeared between 1969 and 1976. He was also the founding editor of Northern Earth (originally the Northern Earth Mysteries Group Newsletter) from 1979 to 1988.

== 2000 onwards: Gerald Gardner and the origins of Wicca ==
Since 2000, Heselton's publications have all centred on the origins of Wicca and its populariser (or inventor) Gerald Gardner. His first publication in this area was Wiccan Roots.

Heselton's second tome detailing his investigations was Gerald Gardner and the Cauldron of Inspiration: An Investigation into the Sources of Gardnerian Witchcraft (2003), again published by Capall Bann. The book was reviewed by Pagan studies scholar Chas S. Clifton in The Pomegranate academic journal, in which he praised Heselton as "an outstanding researcher", who had "dug deeper than anyone before him" into Gardner's life. Clifton however criticised Heselton's interpretation of his data, remarking that he was handicapped by his desire to vindicate Gardner's account of events. Clifton then proposed an alternative account to Heselton's, in which Gardner founded Wicca in the early 1950s and invented the story of the New Forest coven to post-date it. Reviewers in the Pagan press were enthusiastic about the book, treating it as a vindication of traditional accounts of Wiccan origins, although one described it as speculative. A more critical account of the origins of Wicca was previously provided by Ronald Hutton but the relationship between the two appears warm: Hutton has written in the foreword to Gerald Gardner and the Cauldron of Inspiration: "Philip Heselton is the most interesting, valuable and enjoyable author who has yet written on what is becoming one of the greatest riddles in the history of modern religion: the origins of pagan witchcraft".

In 2012 Heselton's biography of Gardner, Witchfather, was published in two volumes by Thoth Publications. This is the first posthumous biography of Gardner, and only the second after Gerald Gardner, Witch, published in 1960 and attributed to Gardner's initiate Jack Bracelin, but in fact written by Idries Shah. In The Pomegranate, the biography was reviewed by Pagan studies scholar Ethan Doyle White, who commented that it was "more exhaustive with greater detail" than Heselton's prior tomes and was "excellent in most respects". He nevertheless expressed a sceptical opinion of Heselton's "uncritical" use of Patricia Crowther's testimony regarding Alex Sanders, the omission of any mention of Anton Miles, and the lack of biographical depth on the individuals who surrounded Gardner. He was very critical of Thoth's decision to divide the book into two volumes, believing that it was done to increase revenues and was detrimental to Heselton's text. Overall he was positive about the biography, describing it as "the definitive biography of this fascinating pioneer" and argued that it crowned Heselton as "the foremost and greatest independent researcher" active in the field of Pagan studies.

John Belham-Payne (The last High Priest of Doreen Valiente) initially considered writing a biography of Doreen Valiente, but feeling that he was incapable of doing so (due to ill health and time constraints), he commissioned Heselton to do so, publishing the result as Doreen Valiente: Witch through the in 2016. It held its launch party at the esoteric-themed bookstore, Treadwell's, in central London, in February 2016, shortly after Belham-Payne's death on 15 February 2016. It was again reviewed in The Pomegranate by Doyle White, who described it as "an easily accessible read", adding "there can be little dispute that once again, Heselton has done a great service to the study of Wiccan history."

== Publications ==
- With Jimmy Goddard and Paul Baines: Skyways and Landmarks Revisited (1985)
- With Brian Larkman: Earth Mysteries – An Explanatory Introduction (1985)
- Tony Wedd: New age pioneer (1986). Northern Earth Mysteries. ISBN 0-948635-01-0
- The Elements of Earth Mysteries (1994). Element Books. ISBN 1-85230-228-3
- Secret Places of the Goddess: Contacting the Earth Spirit (1995). Capall Bann Publishing. ISBN 1-898307-40-7
- Mirrors of Magic: Evoking the Spirit of the Dewponds (1997). Capall Bann Publishing. ISBN 1-898307-84-9
- Leylines – A Beginner's Guide (1999). Hodder Arnold. ISBN 0-340-74316-6
- Magical Guardians: Exploring the Spirit and Nature of Trees 2nd revised edition. (1999). Capall Bann Publishing. ISBN 1-86163-057-3
- Wiccan Roots: Gerald Gardner and the Modern Witchcraft Revival (2000). Capall Bann Publishing. ISBN 1-86163-110-3
- Gerald Gardner and the Witchcraft Revival: The Significance of His Life and Works to the Story of Modern Witchcraft (2001). I-H-O Books. ISBN 1-872189-16-4
- Gerald Gardner and the Cauldron of Inspiration: An Investigation into the Sources of Gardnerian Witchcraft (2003). Capall Bann Publishing. ISBN 1-86163-164-2
- Witchfather: A Life of Gerald Gardner. Vol 1: Into the Witch Cult (2012). Loughborough, Leicestershire: Thoth Publications. ISBN 978-1-870450-80-5
- Witchfather: A Life of Gerald Gardner. Vol 2: From Witch Cult to Wicca (2012). Loughborough, Leicestershire: Thoth Publications. ISBN 978-1-870450-79-9
- Doreen Valiente Witch (2016). The Centre For Pagan Studies. ISBN 978-0-9928430-7-6 (hard) 978-0-9928430-6-9 (paper)
- In Search of the New Forest Coven (2020). Fenix Flames Publishing Ltd. ISBN 978-1913768027 (hardcover), ISBN 978-1913768003
