= Eleanor Bone =

English wiccan (1911–2001)

Eleanor "Ray" Bone
- Born: 15 December 1911
- Died: 21 September 2001 (aged 89)
- Other names: Artemis

Eleanor "Ray" Bone (15 December 1911 – 21 September 2001), who also went under the craft name Artemis, was an influential figure in the neopagan religion of Wicca. She claimed to have been initiated in 1941 by a couple of hereditary witches in Cumbria. She later met and became friends with Gerald Gardner, and was initiated into Wicca, becoming the High Priestess in one of his covens. She was a friend of several important figures in Wicca during the modern Witchcraft revival, including "Dafo", Jack Bracelin, Patricia Crowther, Doreen Valiente and Idries Shah. Bone was a close confidant of Gardner's initiator Dafo, and she reported that the New Forest coven was a hereditary coven that followed the old ways of the Hampshire region, and that they traced their origins to the time of the death of King William Rufus in the Norman era.

Bone was regarded by some as the "Matriarch of British Witchcraft". She founded many covens, among them there were two which were particularly successful: the one in south London in the early 1960s and the one in Brighton. Among her initiatory down-line in London are Madge and Arthur Worthington, who went on to found the well-known Whitecroft line of Gardnerian Wicca. In May 1966 Bone and Patricia Crowther combined to denounce Alex Sanders, whom they accused of having an invalid initiation. According to Ronald Hutton, his response was to claim an entirely independent, traditional line of descent, leading ultimately to the appearance of Alexandrian Wicca as an entity separate from Gardnerian Wicca.

There is some confusion over the spelling of Ray Bone's preferred first name: many modern authors and websites give it as "Rae", possibly in confusion with Rae Beth. A 1964 article and photograph from the UK magazine Tit-Bits gives the authoritative spelling, as well as an article in the Life Magazine.
