= Patricia Crowther (Wiccan) =

British occultist and Wiccan (1927–2025)

Patricia Crowther (née Dawson; 14 October 1927 – 24 September 2025), who also went by the craft name Thelema, was a British occultist considered influential in the early promotion of the Wiccan religion.

== Background ==
Patricia Dawson was born in Sheffield, England on 14 October 1927 to parents Clare and Alfred Dawson. She attended East Bank School and studied at Whiteley's Secretarial College and the Constance Grant School of Dance. She began her career in pantomime theatre.

She was initiated into witchcraft by fellow well-known Wiccan Gerald Gardner. Her handfasting to husband Arnold Crowther (1909–1974) took place in 1960.

Crowther died from complications of dementia in Sheffield on 24 September 2025, at the age of 97.

== Career ==
Along with Doreen Valiente, Lois Bourne, and Eleanor Bone, Crowther is considered to be one of the "early mothers" of modern Wicca. Patricia and her then-husband, Arnold Crowther, founded the Sheffield Coven in 1961, of which they were High Priestess and High Priest. Crowther promoted Witchcraft through a number of book publications, contributions to occult magazines and journals, and through a number of interviews with local and national newspapers. She also appeared several times on television.

In 1971, both Patricia and her then-husband Arnold wrote and presented A Spell of Witchcraft, a radio programme produced and broadcast by BBC Radio Sheffield in six 20-minute parts. The radio programme, the first of its kind in relation to modern Wicca as a religion, explored the history and folklore of witchcraft and presented elements of a local coven's activities and practices within the community.

== Books ==
- 1965 – The Witches Speak (with Arnold Crowther)(Athol Publications)
- 1973 – Witchcraft in Yorkshire (Dalesman) ISBN 0-85206-178-1
- 1974 – Witch Blood (The Diary of a Witch High Priestess) (House of Collectibles) ISBN 0-87637-161-6
- 1981 – Lid off the Cauldron: A handbook for witches (Muller) ISBN 0-584-10421-9
- 1992 – The Zodiac Experience (Samuel Weiser Inc) ISBN 0-87728-739-2
- 1992 – The Secrets of Ancient Witchcraft With the Witches' Tarot (Carol Publishing) ISBN 0-8065-1056-0
- 1992 – Witches Were for Hanging (Excalibur Press of London) ISBN 1-85634-049-X
- 1998 – One Witch's World (Robert Hale) ISBN 0-7090-6222-2 (published in America under the title High Priestess. Apart from the title, they are the same book) (Phoenix Publishing) ISBN 0-919345-87-5
- 2001 – High Priestess: The Life & Times of Patricia Crowther (Phoenix Publishing Inc.) ISBN 978-0919345874
- 2002 – From Stagecraft to Witchcraft: The Early years of a High Priestess (Capall Bann) ISBN 1-86163-163-4
- 2009 – Covensense (Robert Hale) ISBN 9780709087205
