= Covenant of the Goddess =

Cross-traditional Wiccan group

- Covenant of the Goddess logo
- Abbreviation: CoG
- Formation: 1975; 51 years ago
- Founded at: California, U.S.
- Purpose: Educational, philanthropic, religious studies, spirituality
- Affiliations: Feminist Wicca; Goddess movement
- Website: cog.org

The Covenant of the Goddess (CoG) is a cross-traditional Wiccan group of solitary Wiccan practitioners and over one hundred affiliated covens (or congregations). It was founded in 1975 in order to increase co-operation among witches and to secure for witches and covens the legal protection enjoyed by members of other religions. Member covens generally focus theology and ritual around the worship of the Goddess and the Old Gods (or the Goddess alone), which is general practice within Wicca. The Covenant of the Goddess operates largely by consensus and maintains strict autonomy for all members.

== History ==
The CoG began in 1975 when Wiccan elders of various traditions gathered to form an organization for all Witchcraft practitioners. At this meeting, they drafted a covenant and bylaws. That same year on the Summer Solstice, 13 covens ratified the bylaws. It was incorporated on Halloween (or Samhain) 1975, as a non-profit religious organization in California.

== Activities ==
At each Sabbat the group publishes a newsletter. The newsletter is available free in electronic form on the CoG website. A hard copy subscription is also available for a nominal fee to cover production and mailing costs.

CoG has been active in the modern Interfaith Movement. Representatives of Covenant of the Goddess attended the Parliament of the World's Religions in Chicago, Illinois, in 1993; Cape Town, South Africa, in 1999; and Barcelona, Spain, in 2004. Members of the Covenant are also active in the United Religions Initiative, the North American Interfaith Network and many other interfaith groups.

CoG was involved in the campaign to have the Department of Veterans Affairs recognize the pentacle as suitable for headstone markers; see also Sgt. Patrick Stewart. On April 23, 2007, the VA added the pentacle to the list of emblems allowed in national cemeteries and on VA-issued headstones, markers, and plaques.

The group organizes and sponsors an annual festival called "Merry Meet", held in conjunction with the annual business meeting. Representatives from all the member Covens congregate and decide on relevant issues affecting the organization, and Wiccans in general. The business meeting is called the "Grand Council", and is run in a consensus format. There are also workshops, vendors and shopping. As is common with many Wiccan festivals, there are also community rituals and spiritual connections, which play a large part in the festival.

The group created and administers several religious emblem programs for youth and adults working with youth organizations such as the Boy Scouts of America and the Girl Scouts of the USA. The programs are "Over the Moon" for ages 8–11, "Hart and Crescent" for ages 12–18, and the Distinguished Youth Service Award for adults working with youth. Service to the Military and the greater Pagan and Heathen communities is also honored annually at the Merry Meet festival. Due to the scarcity of units chartered by Wiccan organizations the Boy Scouts of America has declined to recognize these programs. As a result, members cannot wear it officially on their uniform. For further information, see Religious emblems programs (Boy Scouts of America).

== Code of Ethics ==
The group operates by a Code of Ethics, which all members (covens or solitary) are expected to understand and follow:

- An ye harm none, do as ye will.
- Since our religion and the arts and practices peculiar to it are the gift of the Goddess, membership and training in a local coven or tradition are bestowed free, as gifts, and only on those persons who are deemed worthy to receive them. However, a coven may expect each of its members to bear a fair share of its ordinary operating expenses.
- All persons have the right to charge reasonable fees for the services by which they earn a living, so long as our religion is not thereby exploited.
- Every person associated with this Covenant shall respect the autonomy and sovereignty of each coven, as well as the right of each coven to oversee the spiritual, mental, emotional and physical development of its members and students in its own way, and shall exercise reasonable caution against infringing upon that right in any way.
- All persons associated with this Covenant shall respect the traditional secrecy of our religion.
- Members of this Covenant should ever keep in mind the underlying unity of our religion as well as the diversity of its manifestations.
- These ethics shall be understood and interpreted in light of one another, and especially in light of the traditional laws of our religion.

== Organization ==
Membership in the Covenant is open to covens and individual members that meet the requirements. Requirements include: subscribing to the Covenant's code of ethics, worship of the Goddess and the Old Gods, pledging to abide by the charter, bylaws and policy of the Council, and agreeing to "hold harmless" any committee or committee member of the Covenant. The Covenant is a confederation of member covens and solitaires. An annual Grand Council is held to make decisions for the whole organization, and members also cooperate in local councils which have at least three covens. Decisions at all levels are made by a formal consensus process.

=== Credentials ===
The Covenant recognizes two levels of clergy: priest or priestess and high priest or high priestess. In addition, the Covenant solemnizes the lifelong relationships of members in "handfasting" ceremonies. Handfasting is not limited to traditional marriages, as any number of people regardless of gender may commit themselves to a lifelong relationship.

== See also ==
- Neopagan witchcraft
- Wiccan organisation

== See also ==
- Goddess movement
