= Gardnerian Wicca =

Tradition in Wiccan religion

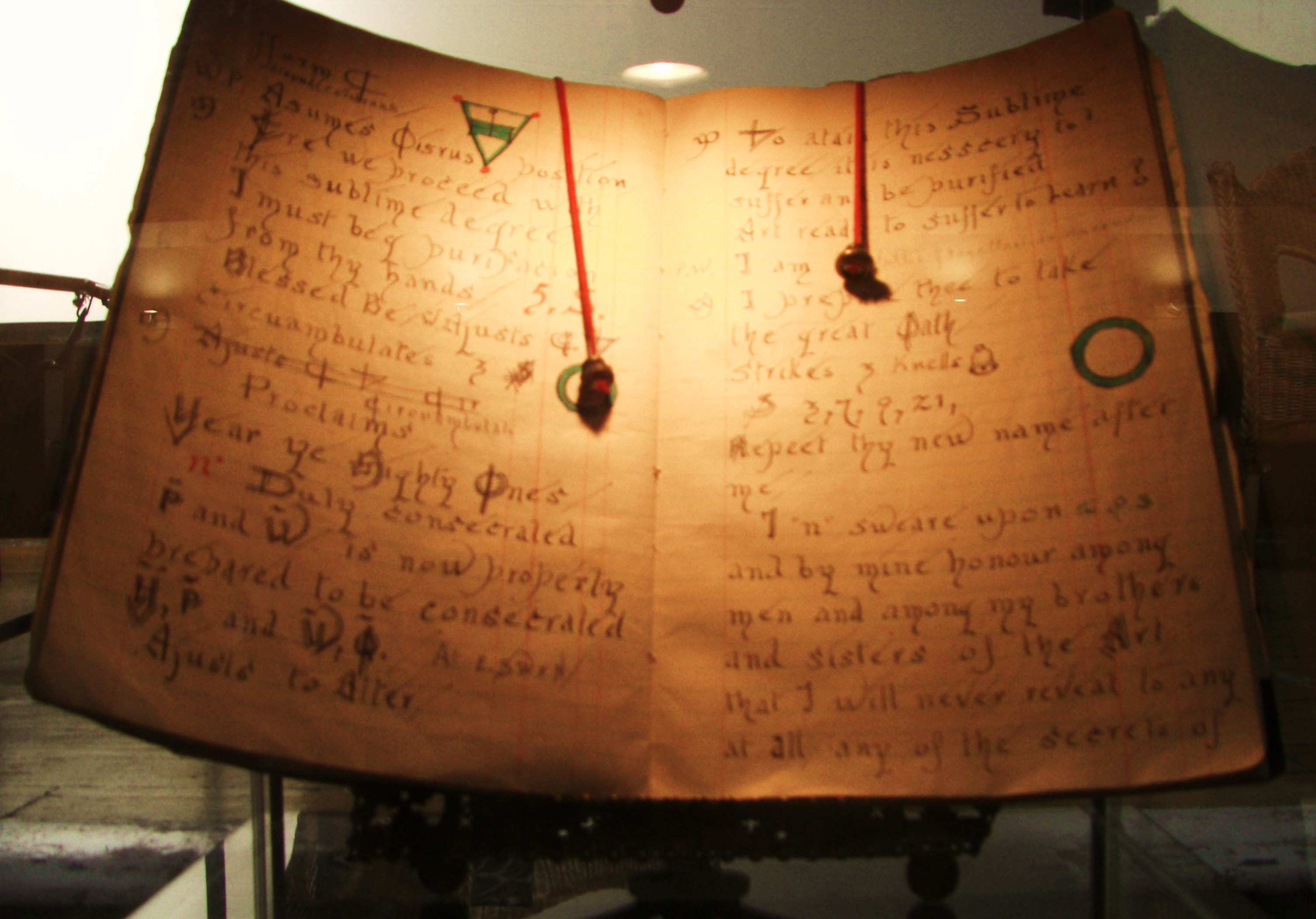
- Gardner's Book of Shadows
- Abbreviation: GW
- Type: Wicca
- Classification: British Traditional Wicca
- Governance: Priesthood
- Region: United Kingdom, United States and Australia
- Founder: Gerald Gardner
- Origin: 1954; Bricket Wood, United Kingdom
- Members: Fewer than 1,000
- Other name: Gardnerian witchcraft

Gardnerian Wicca, or Gardnerian witchcraft, is a tradition in the neopagan religion of Wicca, whose members can trace initiatory descent from Gerald Gardner. The tradition is itself named after Gardner (1884–1964), a British civil servant and amateur scholar of magic. The term "Gardnerian" was probably coined by the founder of Cochranian Witchcraft, Robert Cochrane in the 1950s or 1960s, who himself left that tradition to found his own.

Gardner claimed to have learned the beliefs and practices that would later become known as Gardnerian Wicca from the New Forest coven, who allegedly initiated him into their ranks in 1939. For this reason, Gardnerian Wicca is usually considered to be the earliest created tradition of Wicca, from which most subsequent Wiccan traditions are derived.

From the supposed New Forest coven, Gardner formed his own Bricket Wood coven, and in turn initiated many Witches, including a series of High Priestesses, founding further covens and continuing the initiation of more Wiccans into the tradition. In the UK, Europe, and most Commonwealth countries, someone self-defined as Wiccan is usually understood to be claiming initiatory descent from Gardner, either through Gardnerian Wicca, or through a derived branch such as Alexandrian Wicca. Elsewhere, these original lineaged traditions are termed "British Traditional Wicca".

== Beliefs and practices ==
=== Covens and initiatory lines ===
Gardnerian Wiccans organize into covens that traditionally, although not always, are limited to thirteen members. Covens are led by a High Priestess and the High Priest of her choice, and celebrate both a Goddess and a God.

Gardnerian Wicca and other forms of British Traditional Wicca operate as an initiatory mystery cult; membership is gained only through initiation by a Wiccan High Priestess or High Priest. Any valid line of initiatory descent can be traced all the way back to Gerald Gardner, and through him back to the New Forest coven.

Rituals and coven practices are kept secret from non-initiates, and many Wiccans maintain secrecy regarding their membership in the religion. Whether any individual Wiccan chooses secrecy or openness often depends on their location, career, and life circumstances. In all cases, Gardnerian Wicca absolutely forbids any member to share the name, personal information, fact of membership, and so on without advanced individual consent of that member for that specific instance of sharing.

In Gardnerian Wicca, there are three grades of initiation. Ronald Hutton suggests that "the outlines of the first two [initiation] rituals are very clearly Masonic."

=== Theology ===
In Gardnerian Wicca, the two principal deities are the Horned God and the Mother Goddess. Gardnerians use specific, secret names for the God and the Goddess in their rituals. Doreen Valiente, a Gardnerian High Priestess, revealed that there were more than one.

=== Ethics and morality ===
One ethical guideline often associated with Gardnerian Wicca is "The Rede" or "The Wiccan Rede". In the archaic language often retained in some Gardnerian lore, the Rede states: "An it harm none, do as thou wilt."

Witches [...] are inclined to the morality of the legendary Good King Pausol, "Do what you like so long as you harm no one". But they believe a certain law to be important, "You must not use magic for anything which will cause harm to anyone, and if, to prevent a greater wrong being done, you must discommode someone, you must do it only in a way which will abate the harm."

Another is the Law of Return, sometimes the Rule of Three. Like the Rede, this guideline teaches that whatever energy or intention one puts out into the world, whether magical or not, will return to that person "multiplied by three". This law is controversial, as discussed by John Coughlin, author of The Pagan Resource Guide, in an essay, "The Three-Fold Law".

While these guidelines are thought to be universally accepted by Gardnerians, each coven practices as they wish and are not beholden to such rules. By definition, redes are pieces of advice or counsel, rather than instructions. Therefore, there is no common, codified moral system in Gardnerian Wicca.

The religion tends to be non-dogmatic, allowing each initiate to find for themselves what the ritual experience means by using the basic language of the shared ritual tradition, to be discovered through the Mysteries. The tradition is often characterized as an orthopraxy (correct practice) rather than an orthodoxy (correct thinking), with adherents placing greater emphasis on a shared body of practices as opposed to faith.

== History ==
=== Gardner and the New Forest coven ===
In the early 20th century, Margaret Murray promoted the hypothesis that persecuted witches had actually been followers of a surviving pagan religion, but this theory is now rejected by academia. Nevertheless, it was an influence on some neo-pagans. On retirement from the British Colonial Service, Gerald Gardner moved to London but then before World War II moved to Highcliffe, east of Bournemouth and near the New Forest on the south coast of England. After attending a performance staged by the Rosicrucian Order Crotona Fellowship, he reports meeting a group of people who had preserved their historic occult practices. They recognised him as being "one of them" and convinced him to be initiated. It was only halfway through the initiation, he says, that it dawned on him what kind of group it was, and that witchcraft was still being practised in England.

The group into which Gardner was initiated, known as the New Forest coven, was small and utterly secret as the Witchcraft Act 1735 (9 Geo. 2. c. 5) made it illegal to claim to predict the future, conjure spirits, or cast spells; it likewise made an accusation of witchcraft a criminal offence. Gardner's enthusiasm for the coven led him to wish to document it, but both the witchcraft laws and the coven's secrecy forbade that, despite his excitement. After World War II, Gardner's High Priestess and coven leader relented sufficiently to allow a fictional treatment that did not expose them to prosecution, "High Magic's Aid":

Anyhow, I soon found myself in the circle and took the usual oaths of secrecy which bound me not to reveal any secrets of the cult. But, as it is a dying cult, I thought it was a pity that all the knowledge should be lost, so in the end I was permitted to write, as fiction, something of what a witch believes in the novel High Magic's Aid.

After the witchcraft laws were repealed in 1951, and replaced by the Fraudulent Mediums Act, Gerald Gardner went public, publishing his first non-fiction book, "Witchcraft Today" (1954). Gardner continued, as the text often iterates, to respect his oaths and the wishes of his High Priestess in his writing. Gardner said that the "Witchcraft" religion was dying out, and he pursued publicity and welcomed new initiates during the last years of his life. Gardner even courted the attentions of the tabloid press, to the consternation of some more conservative members of the tradition. In Gardner's own words: "Witchcraft doesn't pay for broken windows!"

Gardner knew many famous occultists. Ross Nichols was a friend and fellow Druid (until 1964 member of the Druid Order, when he left to found his own Druidic Order of Bards, Ovates, and Druids). Nichols edited Gardner's "Witchcraft Today" and is mentioned extensively in Gardner's "The Meaning of Witchcraft". Near the end of Aleister Crowley's life, Gardner met with him for the first time on 1 May 1947 and visited him twice more before Crowley's death that autumn; at some point, Crowley gave Gardner an Ordo Templi Orientis (OTO) charter and the 4th OTO degree—the lowest degree authorising use of the charter.

Doreen Valiente, one of Gardner's priestesses, identified the woman who initiated Gardner as Dorothy Clutterbuck, referenced in "A Witches' Bible" by Janet and Stewart Farrar. Valiente's identification was based on references Gardner made to a woman he called "Old Dorothy" whom Valiente remembered. Biographer Philip Heselton corrects Valiente, clarifying that Clutterbuck (Dorothy St. Quintin-Fordham, née Clutterbuck), a Pagan-minded woman, owned the Mill House, where the New Forest coven performed Gardner's initiation ritual. Scholar Ronald Hutton argues in his Triumph of the Moon that Gardner's tradition was largely the inspiration of members of the Rosicrucian Order Crotona Fellowship and especially that of a woman known by the magical name of "Dafo". Dr. Leo Ruickbie, in his Witchcraft Out of the Shadows, analysed the documented evidence and concluded that Aleister Crowley played a crucial role in inspiring Gardner to establish a new pagan religion. Ruickbie, Hutton, and others further argue that much of what has been published of Gardnerian Wicca, as Gardner's practice came to be known, was written by Blake, Yeats, Valiente and Crowley and contains borrowings from other identifiable sources.

The witches Gardner was originally introduced to were originally referred to by him as "the Wica" and he would often use the term "Witch Cult" to describe the religion. Other terms used, included "Witchcraft" or "the Old Religion." Later publications standardised the spelling to "Wicca" and it came to be used as the term for the Craft, rather than its followers. "Gardnerian" was originally a pejorative term used by Gardner's contemporary Roy Bowers (also known as Robert Cochrane), a British cunning man, who nonetheless was initiated into Gardnerian Wicca a couple of years following Gardner's death.

=== Reconstruction of the Wiccan rituals ===
Gardner stated that the rituals of the existing group were fragmentary at best, and he set about fleshing them out, drawing on his library and knowledge as an occultist and amateur folklorist. Gardner borrowed and wove together appropriate material from other artists and occultists, most notably Charles Godfrey Leland's Aradia, or the Gospel of the Witches, the Key of Solomon as published by S.L. MacGregor Mathers, Masonic ritual, Crowley, and Rudyard Kipling. Doreen Valiente wrote much of the best-known poetry, including the much-quoted Charge of the Goddess.

=== Bricket Wood coven ===
In 1948–1949, Gardner and Dafo were running a coven separate from the original New Forest coven at a naturist club near Bricket Wood to the north of London. By 1952 Dafo's health had begun to decline, and she was increasingly wary of Gardner's publicity-seeking.

In 1953, Gardner met Doreen Valiente, who was to become his High Priestess in succession to Dafo. The question of publicity led to Doreen and others formulating thirteen proposed 'Rules for the Craft', which included restrictions on contact with the press. Gardner responded with the sudden production of the Wiccan Laws which led to some of his members, including Valiente, leaving the coven.

Gardner reported that witches were taught that the power of the human body can be released, for use in a coven's circle, by various means, and released more easily without clothing. A simple method was dancing round the circle singing or chanting; another method was the traditional "binding and scourging". In addition to raising power, "binding and scourging" can heighten the initiates' sensitivity and spiritual experience.

Following the time Gardner spent on the Isle of Man, the coven began to experiment with circle dancing as an alternative. It was also about this time that the lesser 4 of the 8 Sabbats were given greater prominence. Bricket Wood coven members liked the Sabbat celebrations so much, they decided that there was no reason to keep them confined to the closest full moon meeting, and made them festivities in their own right. As Gardner had no objection to this change suggested by the Bricket Wood coven, this collective decision resulted in what is now the standard eight festivities in the Wiccan Wheel of the year.

The split with Valiente led to the Bricket Wood coven being led by Jack Bracelin and a new High Priestess, Dayonis. This was the first of a number of disputes between individuals and groups, but the increased publicity only seems to have allowed Gardnerian Wicca to grow much more rapidly. Certain others also helped fuel this publicity, such as Alex Sanders (real name Orrell Alexander Carter) and Raymond Buckland. Sanders started his own separate tradition, together with his wife Maxine, known as Alexandrian Wicca and frequently were covered by the press. Buckland, who authored dozens of books on the subject, brought the Gardnerian tradition to the United States in 1964, later to start his own tradition known as Seax Wicca.

=== Controversy over transgender individuals and male/female polarity ===
On July 18, 2022, A Declaration of the Traditional Gardnerian Wica, was released, with The Wild Hunt reporting that "the document was signed and sealed by 47 Gardnerians who are either third-degree or autonomous second-degree," before further clarifying that "there is no central Gardnerian authority akin to a sovereign spiritual leader found in other faiths." The declaration asserts that Gardnerian Wicca is fundamentally rooted in "fertility and the generative powers of the universe," and that its core Mysteries are transmitted specifically through ritual polarity between biological males and biological females. These claims which were "labeled transphobic by a number of prominent Gardnerians" were met with "strong condemnations and widespread dismissal". Pagan news site The Wild Hunt noted that because of Gardnerian Wicca's decentralized structure and emphasis on coven autonomy, the declaration "effectively only applies to covens that are led by or hive from the documents' signers."

== See also ==
- New Forest coven
