= New Forest coven =

Alleged British group of witches

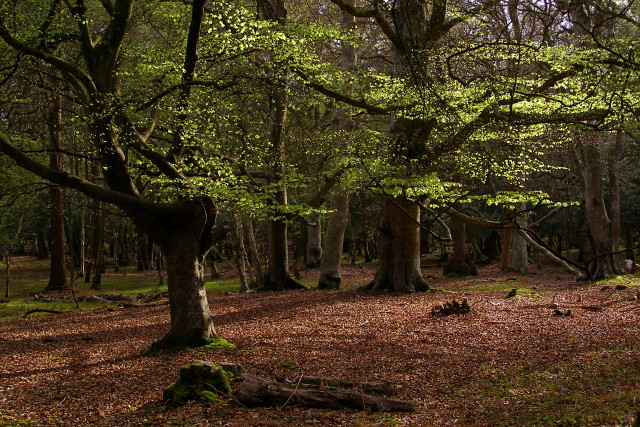
New Forest in Hampshire where the founder of Wicca, Gerald Gardner, stated he encountered the New Forest coven.

The New Forest coven was an alleged group of pagan witches who met around the area of the New Forest in Southern England during the early 20th century. According to his own claims, in September 1939, a British occultist named Gerald Gardner was initiated into the coven and subsequently used its beliefs and practices as a basis from which he formed the tradition of Gardnerian Wicca. Gardner described some of his experiences with the coven in his published books Witchcraft Today (1954) and The Meaning of Witchcraft (1959) although on the whole revealed little about it, saying he was respecting the privacy of its members. Meanwhile, another occultist, Louis Wilkinson, corroborated Gardner's claims by revealing in an interview with the writer Francis X. King that he too had encountered the coven and expanded on some of the information that Gardner had provided about them. According to Gardner, the faith they followed was the Witch-Cult, a supposed pagan religion that had survived in secret after the Christianization of Europe. This was in keeping with the now-discredited theories of Margaret Murray and her supporters.

As Wicca developed in the latter decades of the twentieth century, some of the figures who were researching its origins, such as Aidan Kelly and later Leo Ruickbie, came to the conclusion that the New Forest coven was an invention of Gardner's to provide a historical basis for his faith. The historian Ronald Hutton accepted this as a possibility, although recognised that it was not "implausible" that the coven had indeed existed. Later research by Philip Heselton which was published in the early twenty-first century, indicated that there was much evidence for a coven of practitioners, whose members he identified as being Dorothy Clutterbuck, Edith Woodford-Grimes, Ernest Mason, Susie Mason, Rosamund Sabine and Katherine Oldmeadow.

== History ==
=== Origins ===
Gerald Gardner claimed that the New Forest coven was a survival of the Witch-Cult, a supposed pre-Christian pagan religion that worshipped a Horned God and a Triple Goddess, and which had supposedly been persecuted during the witch trials of the Early Modern period. This theory about the witch trials had been put forward by various writers in the nineteenth century, such as Jules Michelet and Charles Leland, but had risen to prominence in the early twentieth century when it was promoted in two of the works of Egyptologist Dr Margaret Murray: The Witch-Cult in Western Europe (1921) and The God of the Witches (1933). The idea of the pagan Witch-Cult has been disproved and dismissed by historians specialising in the Early Modern witch trials since Murray's death in 1963, with works by academics like Elliot Rose, Norman Cohn, Carlo Ginzburg and Keith Thomas instead showing the real nature of the witch trials as a combination of social, economic and religious factors. It is for this reason that the historian Ronald Hutton (1999) dismissed any possibility of the New Forest coven being a pagan survival.

Instead, it has been proposed that the New Forest coven had been founded in the early twentieth century by various occultists who wished to 'resurrect' the hypothetical Witch-Cult as described in Murray's works. Philip Heselton (2003), who performed the most exhaustive research into the group, speculated that the coven had been formed by a woman named Rosamund Sabine, who prior to moving to the New Forest in 1924 had been involved in various esoteric groups like the Hermetic Order of the Golden Dawn. He thought that she, after reading The Witch-Cult in Western Europe, became interested in witches, and believed herself to be the reincarnation of one. It was for this reason, he believed, that she gathered together some of her friends who also had an interest in the occult, and founded the coven. Davis Stanton writes, "In other words, Wicca was only 'new' in the sense the New Forest was new - a re-designation of something that was there before, under another name".

A different origin theory was put forward by Steve Wilson (1996), who speculated that the coven might have been founded by members of a scouting organisation, the Order of Woodcraft Chivalry. Heselton accepted similarities between the Order and the coven, but did not believe that there was any direct connection.

=== Gerald Gardner's involvement ===
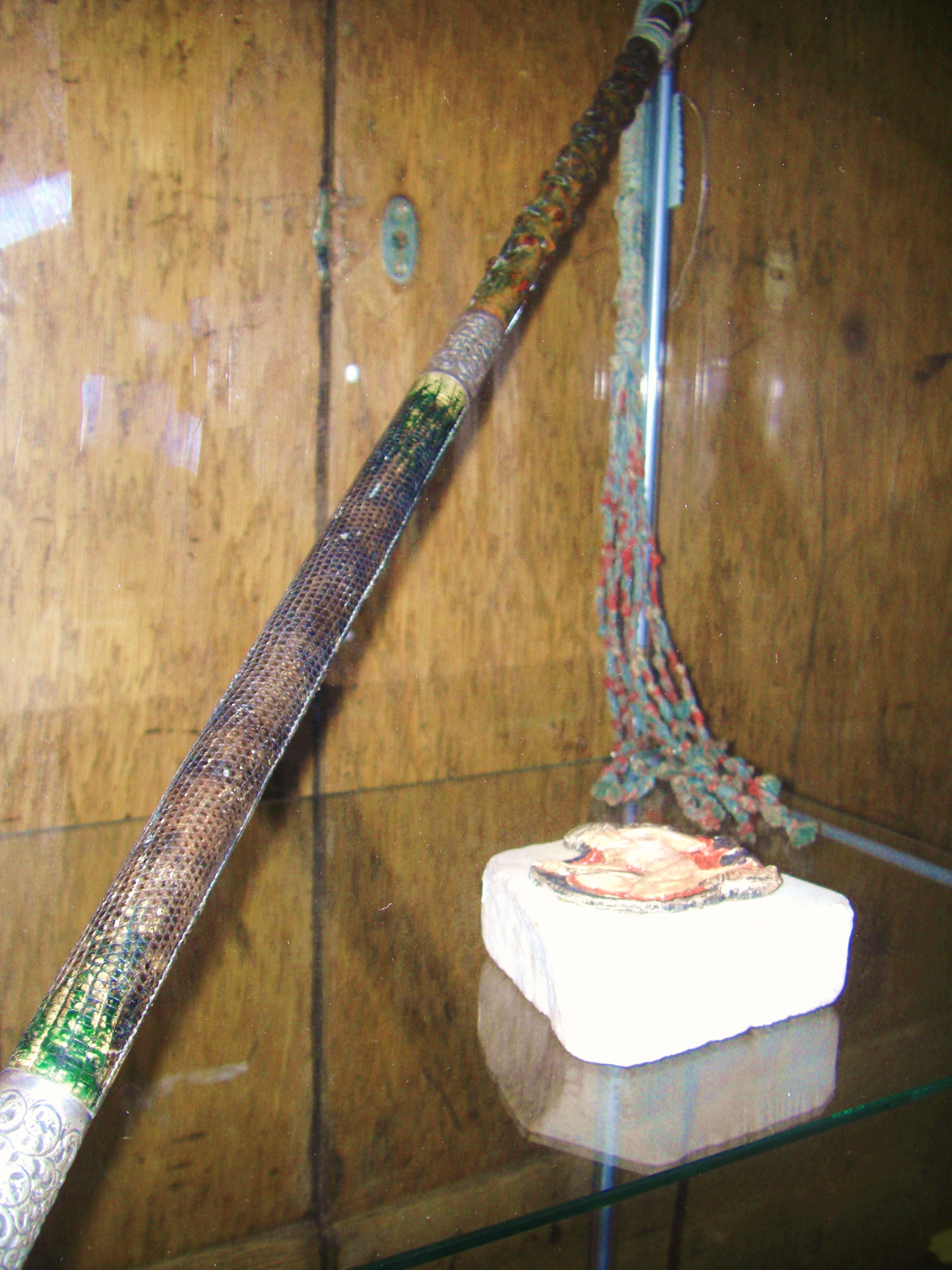
A ritual scourge owned by the New Forest coven which Gardner subsequently inherited.

Gerald Gardner claimed that after moving to the borough of Christchurch, Dorset in 1939, he got involved with the Rosicrucian Order Crotona Fellowship, an occult organisation based upon Rosicrucianism. However, he was largely dissatisfied with the Order, and in particular its leader, George Alexander Sullivan, believing them to be devoid of any genuine esoteric knowledge. Meanwhile, he met a group of people within the Fellowship who claimed to have been involved in a form of Freemasonry known as Co-Masonry, who informed him that they had moved to the area where they had joined the Rosicrucian Order when their friend and fellow Co-Mason, Mabel Besant-Scott, had done so. The researcher Philip Heselton identified two of these individuals as Ernest and Susie Mason, a brother and sister couple who had in prior decades been involved in a variety of occult groups, including Co-Masonry and Theosophy, and who had recently moved to the area from Southampton. According to Gardner:

They seemed rather brow-beaten by the others, kept themselves to themselves. They were the most interesting element, however. Unlike many of the others, they had to earn their livings, were cheerful and optimistic and had a real interest in the occult.

This group claimed to have known Gardner from a past life, and in September 1939, revealed to him that they were members of a Witches' coven, and then initiated him into Wicca in a ritual which took place in one of the homes owned by Dorothy Clutterbuck.

=== Operation Cone of Power ===
Gardner would reveal little about the coven and its members, although claimed that in August 1940, during the midst of the Second World War, they performed a ritual known as Operation Cone of Power which they hoped would influence the High Command of Nazi Germany and prevent them from invading Britain. This magical ritual, Gardner claimed, took place inside the Forest, and involved the Witches raising a Cone of Power which they directed toward Germany and focused on sending the message into the minds of the German leaders that they would not be able to cross the English Channel. Gardner also noted that several of the older and frailer practicing Witches died after practicing the ritual, something that was confirmed by Louis Wilkinson, who claimed that it was because they had performed the ritual naked, without goose grease on the skin to keep them warm, and that as such they had contracted pneumonia. Investigating these claims, Heselton found two locals who died soon after the ritual: a reporter, Walter Forder (1881–1940), and a blacksmith, Charles Loader (1864–1940), whom he speculated were involved in the rite.

== Coven members ==
According to Gardner, his first contact with the witches was through an inner group within the Crotona Fellowship, a Rosicrucian society that operated a theatre in Christchurch. They were a reserved group, who remained somewhat separate from other members of the order and the theatre. Historian Philip Heselton has identified some of the members of this group as Edith Woodford-Grimes, Ernie Mason, and his sisters Susie Mason and Rosetta Fudge. It is possible that by the late 1930s some members of the Crotona Fellowship, inspired by the work of Margaret Murray, were performing rituals based on Co-Masonry and incorporating elements of folklore, and that these were the rituals that Gardner encountered.

=== The Mason family ===
The Mason family, researched by Heselton, lived in Southampton for a period of over 150 years. One of Heselton's informants described Ernie in particular and the family in general, as 'witches', adding that Ernie, who he had known for several years, had had to give up because he found the rituals too strenuous. Rosetta was a keen follower of Anthroposophy; Susie was a Co-Freemason and Theosophist, and Ernie, who claimed to have been fully aware from the moment of his birth, was an enthusiastic esotericist and taught mental exercises in the Crotona Fellowship. Their father George Miles Mason, an optician and astronomer, had built a meeting hall in Southampton which seems to have been used for the meetings of various esoteric groups, including Co-Freemasonry. Heselton points to a reference to nearby Toothill as a "witch centre" in a book by Justine Glass, who does not name her informant. In the 1881 census nearly a quarter of the inhabitants of that hamlet (three families) had the surname Mason (an otherwise uncommon name in that part of England); based on this and other circumstantial evidence he proposes that the Mason family could have been the custodians of a hereditary witchcraft tradition.

=== Edith Woodford-Grimes ===
The priestess who initiated Gardner into witchcraft was referred to as "Dafo" or "Daffo". She taught music and elocution, and her daughter married a dentist; these and other details identify her as Edith Rose Woodford-Grimes. She lived in the same street as the Mason family between 1922 and 1937, when they were heavily involved in esoteric activities. By 1938 she was living in Christchurch near the Rosicrucian theatre, and was an active member. In August 1940, at her daughter's wedding, the bride was given away by Gerald Gardner, who was described as a "close friend". Edith remained a close friend of Gardner's for the rest of his life.

== See also ==
- Ashrama Hall and Christchurch Garden Theatre
- Neopagan witchcraft
- Wiccan organisation
