= The Meaning of Witchcraft =

Book by Gerald Gardner

- First edition
- Author: Gerald Gardner
- Language: French
- Genre: History; Folklore; Wicca
- Publisher: Various
- Publication date: 1959
- Publication place: France
- ISBN: 978-1-57863-309-8

The Meaning of Witchcraft is a non-fiction book written by Gerald Gardner. Gardner, known to many in the modern sense as the "Father of Wicca", based the book around his experiences with the religion of Wicca and the New Forest Coven. It was first published in 1959, only after the British Parliament repealed the Witchcraft Act 1735 (9 Geo. 2. c. 5), and proved to be Gardner's final book. The Wicca religion as expounded by Gardner was focused on a goddess, identified with the night sky and with wild nature, and a horned god who represented the fertilizing powers of the natural world. It was organized into covens, through which members were initiated through three ascending degrees of competence and authority and which were governed by a high priestess, supported by a high priest.

The Meaning of Witchcraft is a sequel to Gardner's previous book on the subject, Witchcraft Today, which was published in 1954. Chapters include: Witch's Memories and Beliefs, The Stone Age Origins of Witchcraft, Druidism and the Aryan Celts, Magic Thinking, Curious Beliefs about Witches, Signs and Symbols, The Black Mass, Some Allegations Examined. When Gardner died in 1964, the copyright for the book was left to the High Priestess of his coven, Monique Wilson.

Gardner wrote the book in order to publicise Wicca, which he believed would die out unless more converts could be attracted. Gardner himself believed that Wicca was the survival of an ancient pagan Witch-cult, a theory originating from historian Margaret Murray which has now largely been discredited by historians like Ronald Hutton and Jeffrey Russell. Margaret Murray's theory maintained that witches were indeed members of an organized cult surviving from pagan times. According to Murray, Christianity remained a thin veneer which cloaked pagan customs down to the sixteenth century. Hutton does say that all the modern branches of Wicca are either based on or influenced by his (Gardner) teachings. It is the only complete religion (as opposed to sect or denomination) which England has ever given the world.
