= Frederic Lamond (Wiccan) =

British Wiccan priest

- Born: 5 July 1931
- Died: 24 May 2020 (aged 88)
- Occupations: Computer technician; writer; Wiccan priest
- Spouse(s): Gillian, later Hildegard

Frederic Lamond (5 July 1931 – 24 May 2020) (also known by the craft name Robert) was a prominent English Wiccan. He was an early member of the Gardnerian tradition having been initiated into the Bricket Wood coven in 1957. He became involved in a number of Pagan organisations, including the Fellowship of Isis, and participated in the interfaith movement. He wrote a number of books on the subject of Wiccan theology and history.

== Biography ==
=== Early life: 1931–1956 ===
Lamond was born an only child and when he was only two years old his parents divorced, leaving him to live with his maternal grandparents. After the start of World War II, his grandmother, who was of Jewish ethnicity, took him to live in Switzerland, which was then one of the only neutral countries in Europe.

Lamond was raised in a relatively free religious environment and was not forced to follow any religion. His grandmother had repeated on numerous occasions that "all religious dogmas are lies!". However, she still sent him to Protestant catechism to learn Biblical history when he was thirteen. She believed it necessary for any educated European. He would later remark that whilst he admired Jesus Christ, he did not think him any more holy than any other good men in history – and he disliked the God that was presented in the Old Testament. Nonetheless, he received his Christian confirmation at fifteen and spent his next two years at an Anglican boarding school, in England. It was there he realised his beliefs did not agree with those of Christianity and ceased identifying as a Christian.

From here, Lamond went to Cambridge University, where he became involved in the cause for European federalism and joined the Progressive League. In 1954, he first partook of sexual intercourse with a local girl, Mary, with whom he had fallen in love, an experience that he said allowed him to encounter the goddess Aphrodite, who he felt as a presence near to him. The two planned to be married, but the engagement was ended after opposition from Mary's parents.

=== Involvement with Wicca: 1957–2020 ===
After his experience with Aphrodite, and his lifetime belief in pantheism, Lamond became further interested in paganism, and it was through this that he read Gerald Gardner's book Witchcraft Today (1954). Lamond wrote to Gardner, who invited him to meet him at his flat in Holland Park, London. The two became friends, and Lamond was introduced to other members of the Bricket Wood coven. They invited him to join them, and he was initiated, alongside another new figure, who has remained nameless, at the Sabbat of Imbolc.

In 1959, Lamond met his future wife, Gillian, and they moved into a flat together in September of that year. In August 1960 they married, and a party was held by coven member Jack Bracelin at Fiveacres nudist club, where the marriage was blessed by Lois Bourne, the coven's High Priestess. The historian Ronald Hutton remarked that this was the first known example of a Wiccan marriage ceremony. From October 1961 to August 1964, the Lamonds lived in Greater Manchester, where Frederic worked for a computer company, and they only circled with the Bricket Wood coven on occasional visits back to London. In October 1965, Fred was posted to work in Prague to lead a technical support group, and whilst Gillian at first went with him, she returned to England in 1966 to care for their daughter, who had been diagnosed as being deaf. In April 1967 Lamond too returned home.

In 1981, Lamond met with the controversial American Wiccan Aidan Kelly in California, and seven years later Lamond once again visited Kelly, taking part in a ritual with Kelly's coven. In July 1986, Lamond's first wife, Gillian, died. After this, Lamond joined two different occultic groups, the Companions of the Rainbow Bridge, and the Fellowship of Isis. In winter 1993, Lamond and his new wife Hildegard visited Lamond's father in Austria. In August 1994 they moved to Austria permanently. Lamond met very few neopagans in the country, but in 2000 he started meeting a few at a monthly pub moot, and in 2003 initiated three Austrian women into the craft.

== Bibliography ==
Lamond published three books about Wicca and Neopaganism :

- The Divine Struggle (1990).
- Religion Without Beliefs: Essays in Pantheist Theology, Comparative Religion and Ethics (1997). Janus Publishing. ISBN 1-85756-341-7.
- Fifty Years of Wicca (2004). Green Magic. ISBN 0-9547230-1-5.
