= Museum of Witchcraft and Magic =

Museum in Cornwall, England

Coordinates: 50.689°N 4.692°W

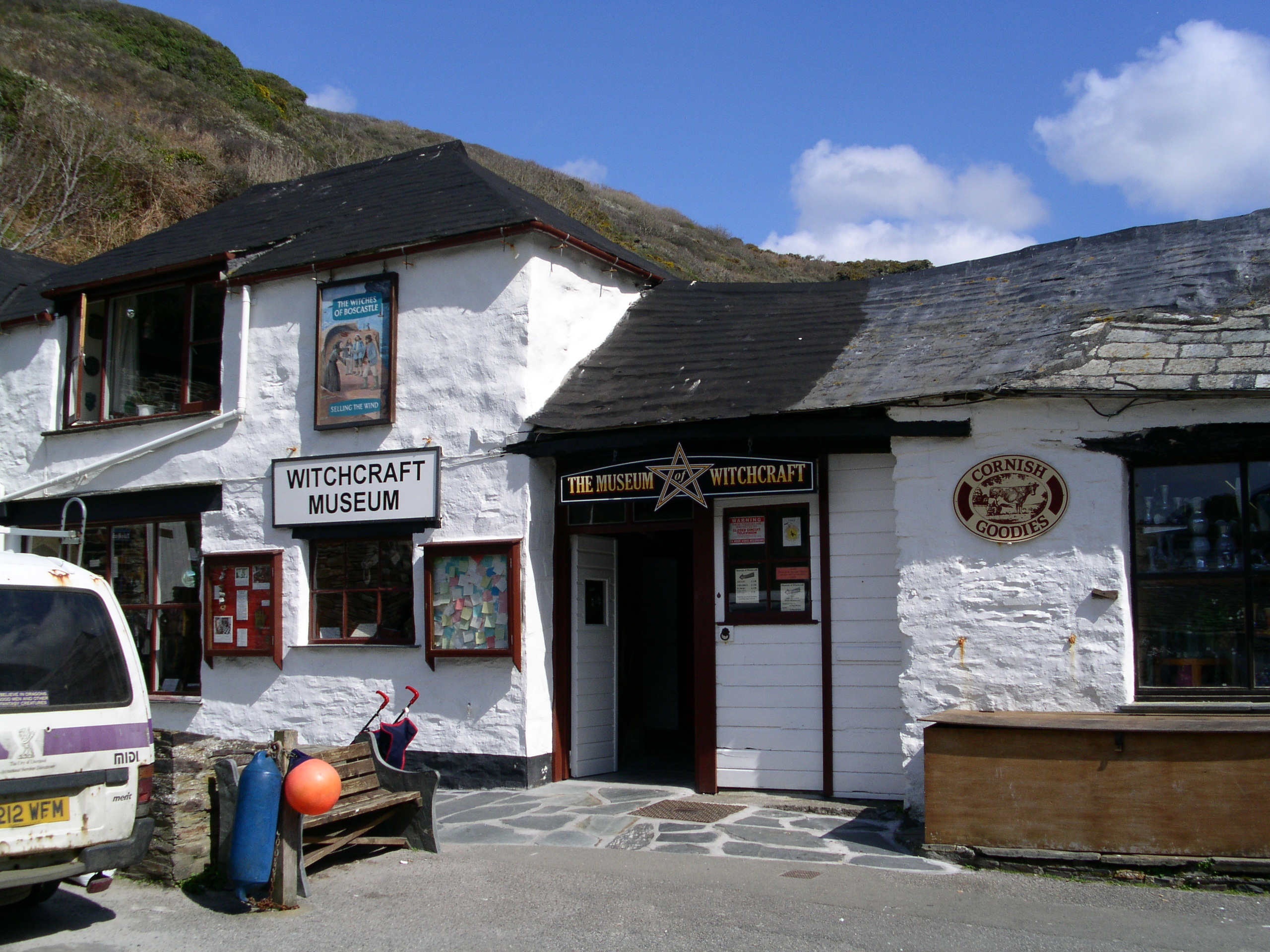
- Established: 1951; 75 years ago
- Location: Boscastle, Cornwall
- Director: Simon Costin
- Website: http://www.museumofwitchcraftandmagic.co.uk/

The Museum of Witchcraft and Magic, formerly known as the Museum of Witchcraft, is a museum dedicated to European witchcraft and magic located in the village of Boscastle in Cornwall, south-west England. It houses exhibits devoted to folk magic, ceremonial magic, Freemasonry, and Wicca, with its collection of such objects having been described as the largest in the world.

The museum was founded by the English folk magician Cecil Williamson in 1951 to display his own personal collection of artefacts. Initially known as the Folklore Centre of Superstition and Witchcraft, it was located in the town of Castletown on the Isle of Man. Williamson was assisted at the museum by the prominent Wiccan Gerald Gardner, who remained there as "resident witch". After their friendship deteriorated, Gardner purchased it from Williamson in 1954, renaming it the Museum of Magic and Witchcraft. Gardner's Castletown museum remained open until the 1970s, when Gardner's heir Monique Wilson sold its contents to the Ripley's company.

In 1954, Williamson opened his own rival back in England, known as the Museum of Witchcraft. Its first location was at Windsor, Berkshire, and the next at Bourton-on-the-Water, Gloucestershire; in both cases it faced violent opposition and Williamson felt it necessary to move, establishing the museum in Boscastle in 1960. In 1996 Williamson sold the museum to Graham King, who incorporated the Richel collection of magical regalia from the Netherlands in 2000. The museum was damaged and part of its collection lost during the Boscastle flood of 2004. In 2013 ownership was transferred to Simon Costin and his Museum of British Folklore.

The museum is a popular tourist attraction and is held in high esteem by the British occult community. A charity, Friends of the Museum of Witchcraft, has been established to raise funds for the exhibits. The museum also contains a large library on related topics that is accessible to researchers.

== History ==
=== Origins: 1947–60 ===
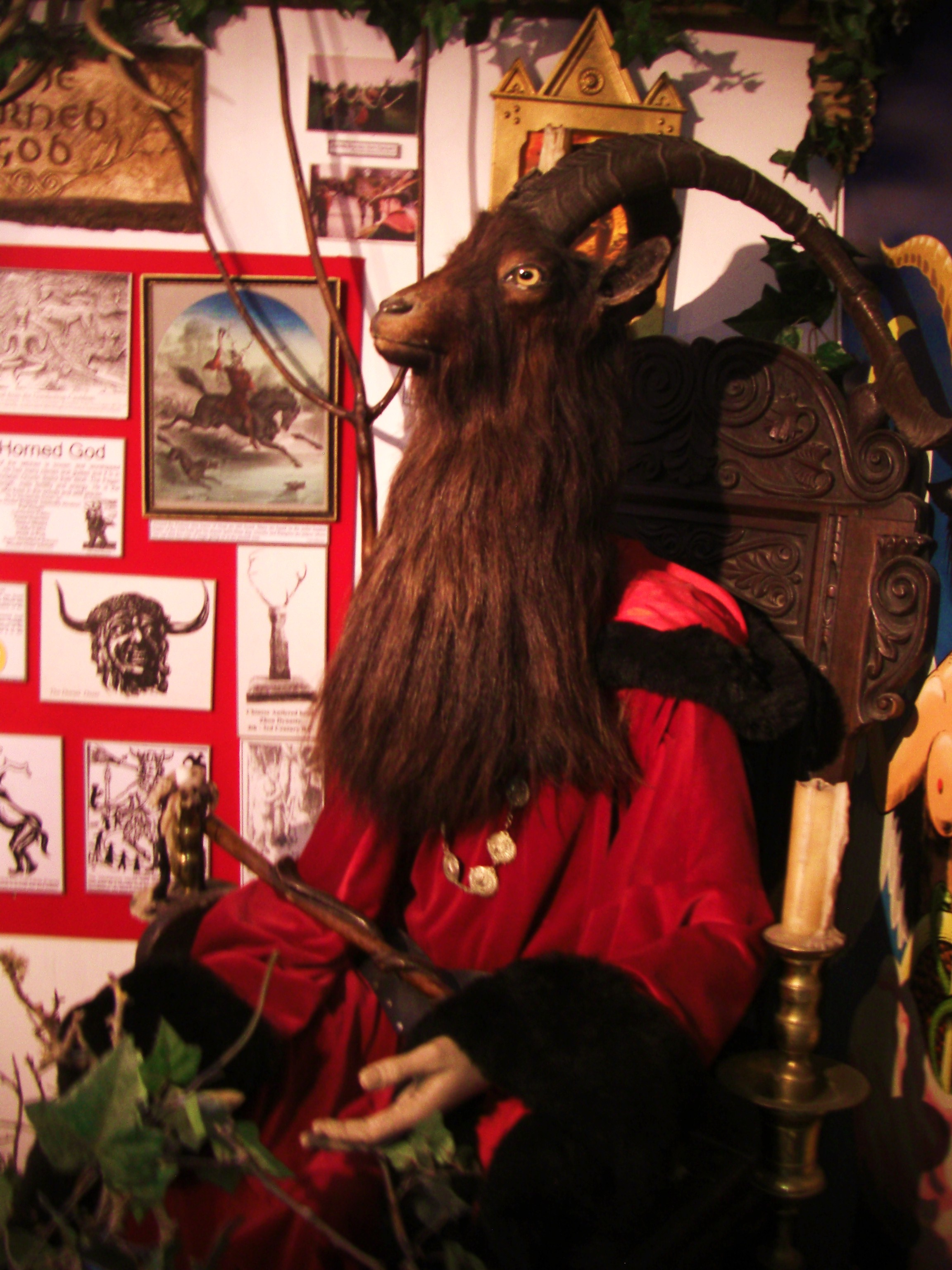
A sculpture of the Horned God of Wicca at the museum

After the Second World War, the former film producer Cecil Williamson decided to move into the museum business, and—probably influenced by personal interest—decided to open one that would be devoted to the subject of witchcraft. Williamson tried to open a museum to hold his collection of witchcraft and occult artifacts in Stratford-upon-Avon in 1947, but faced local opposition and had to abandon his plans. He then decided to open it in Castletown on the Isle of Man, an area which had much folklore surrounding fairies and witches, a tourist season, and local laws that were congenial to the establishment of a museum. He had it set up in a dilapidated old mill known locally as the Witches' Mill which he had purchased in 1948, and, at the advice of his wife, opened an adjacent restaurant, known as the Witches' Kitchen.

The museum was first named the Folklore Centre of Superstition and Witchcraft. The launch of the museum was timed to coincide with the government's repeal of the Witchcraft and Vagrancy Acts in June 1951. In an interview with The Sunday Pictorial newspaper, Williamson claimed to be friends with at least a dozen witches, and that he had invited a coven from southern England to come and practice their rituals at his museum. The historian Ronald Hutton deemed this to "fairly clearly" be a reference to the Bricket Wood coven which was based in Hertfordshire and run by the Wiccan Gerald Gardner. In press interviews, Gardner was described as the museum's "resident witch" and performed a magical ritual at the museum's opening ceremony. For Williamson, the press interest served to promote his museum, while for Gardner it gave the opportunity to promote Wicca at a safe distance from his main coven.

Williamson also had a practical interest in magic, and in a 1952 interview with popular magazine Illustrated described himself as a consultant on the subject who could help remove curses from people, akin to an old cunning man. He acknowledged that he knew many of these spells from reading about them in books. He took an interest in the late ceremonial magician Aleister Crowley and wrote to Crowley's friend Gerald Yorke to enquire as to whether he could send him the instructions for any of Crowley's rituals.

However, Gardner fell out with Williamson over what he saw as sensationalist displays. Williamson, in retaliation, removed a photograph of Gardner from the display. Williamson sold the museum to Gardner.

=== The Williamson-Gardner split: 1953–64 ===
Williamson decided to return to England, and took his collection of witchcraft artefacts with him. In 1954 Gardner bought the Witches' Mill from him, and renamed it The Museum of Magic and Witchcraft, filling it with his own collection of artefacts. During the 1950s, Gardner discussed moving his museum to London with his then friend, Charles Cardell, but decided not to. According to the historian Ronald Hutton, this left Gardner with "a secure and congenial base" from which he could promote Wicca by writing such books as Witchcraft Today (1954) and The Meaning of Witchcraft (1959). Gardner continued to run the museum until his death in 1964, when it was briefly run by his High Priestess Monique Wilson before it was shut down and the collection sold off. Ripley's Entertainment Inc. bought the collection and in 1972 opened the "Museum of Witchcraft and Magic" at Gatlinburg, TN and San Francisco, CA. In 1975, due to pressure from the local church and religious groups, Ripley's changed the name of the museums to the "World of the Unexplained". More attractions and items were added to the present witchcraft collection. In 1985, Ripley's closed both museums due to poor ticket sales. The collection was disbursed to other Ripley's museums. A lot of the witchcraft collection was sent to Ripley's Believe It or Not museum at Blackpool, England.

In his will, Gardner left the museum to his assistant there, with the proviso that if he did not want it then it would go to his initiate Monique Wilson, which is what happened.

On his return to England in 1954, Williamson opened the museum, now known as the Museum of Witchcraft, in Windsor. Here it stayed open for the tourist season, and was quite successful, but local opinion was still against it, and so Williamson decided to move it again. In 1954 Williamson moved the museum to Bourton-on-the-Water in Gloucestershire. The museum suffered various persecutions, including signs being painted on walls and dead cats hung from trees, and eventually it was largely damaged in an arson attack.

=== Boscastle: 1960–present ===
In 1960 Williamson moved the museum to Boscastle in Cornwall. Williamson displayed some artefacts associated with ceremonial magic, but was largely interested in folk magic and the practices of what he called the "wayside witch".

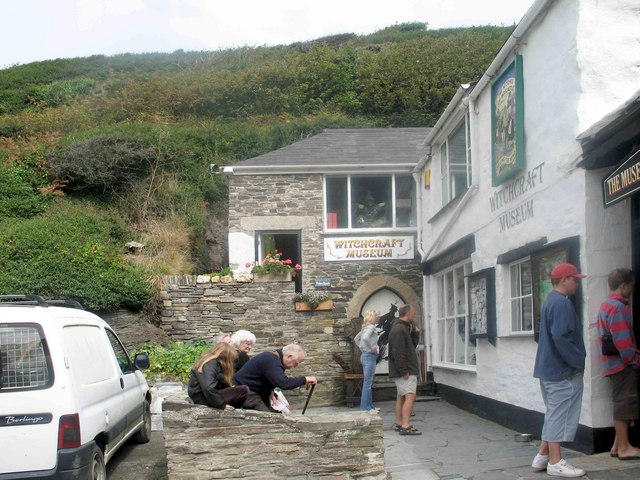
The exterior of the museum

Williamson retired in 1996, selling the museum to Graham King and Liz Crow. A practising Pagan with interests in witchcraft, King owned a business manufacturing specialist cameras in Hampshire when he discovered that the museum was for sale in a newspaper article. King and Williamson finalised the purchase at midnight on Halloween 1996. King and Crow reorganised the museum and removed some of the more sensationalist exhibits, such as a partially clothed female mannequin which had been laid on an altar to represent the Black Mass. King appeared on BBC television series such as A Seaside Parish and Antiques Roadshow. He organised the burial of Joan Wytte, a woman who died in Bodmin Jail under accusations of witchcraft in 1813, and whose corpse had been at the museum for many years. She was buried in a local area of woodland in 1998. The museum was damaged during heavy floods in August 2004, resulting in it being closed for repairs until March 2005.

After King took over, a group known as the Friends of the Museum was established; it holds an annual weekend of lectures. It was subsequently converted into a charity. To commemorate the museum's sixtieth anniversary, in 2011 the Occult Art Company published an anthology entitled The Museum of Witchcraft: A Magical History. The idea for the work had been provided by the chair of the Friends, Judith Noble, with the volume itself being edited by Kerrian Godwin. It contained contributions from 51 individuals involved in the esoteric and Pagan communities, including prominent figures like Ronald Hutton, Philip Heselton, Patricia Crowther, and Marian Green. Reviewed by Pagan studies scholar Ethan Doyle White in The Pomegranate journal, he welcomed the volume yet described its contents as a "mixed bag, with the articles varying in their quality and relevance to the subject at hand."

On Halloween 2013 King transferred ownership of the museum, its collection and library, to the designer and curator Simon Costin, who had founded the Museum of British Folklore in 2009. King retained ownership of the museum's building, which was leased to Costin's Museum. Costin informed the Cornish Guardian that "The museum will continue to run exactly as it is. It won't change at all."

== Exhibits ==
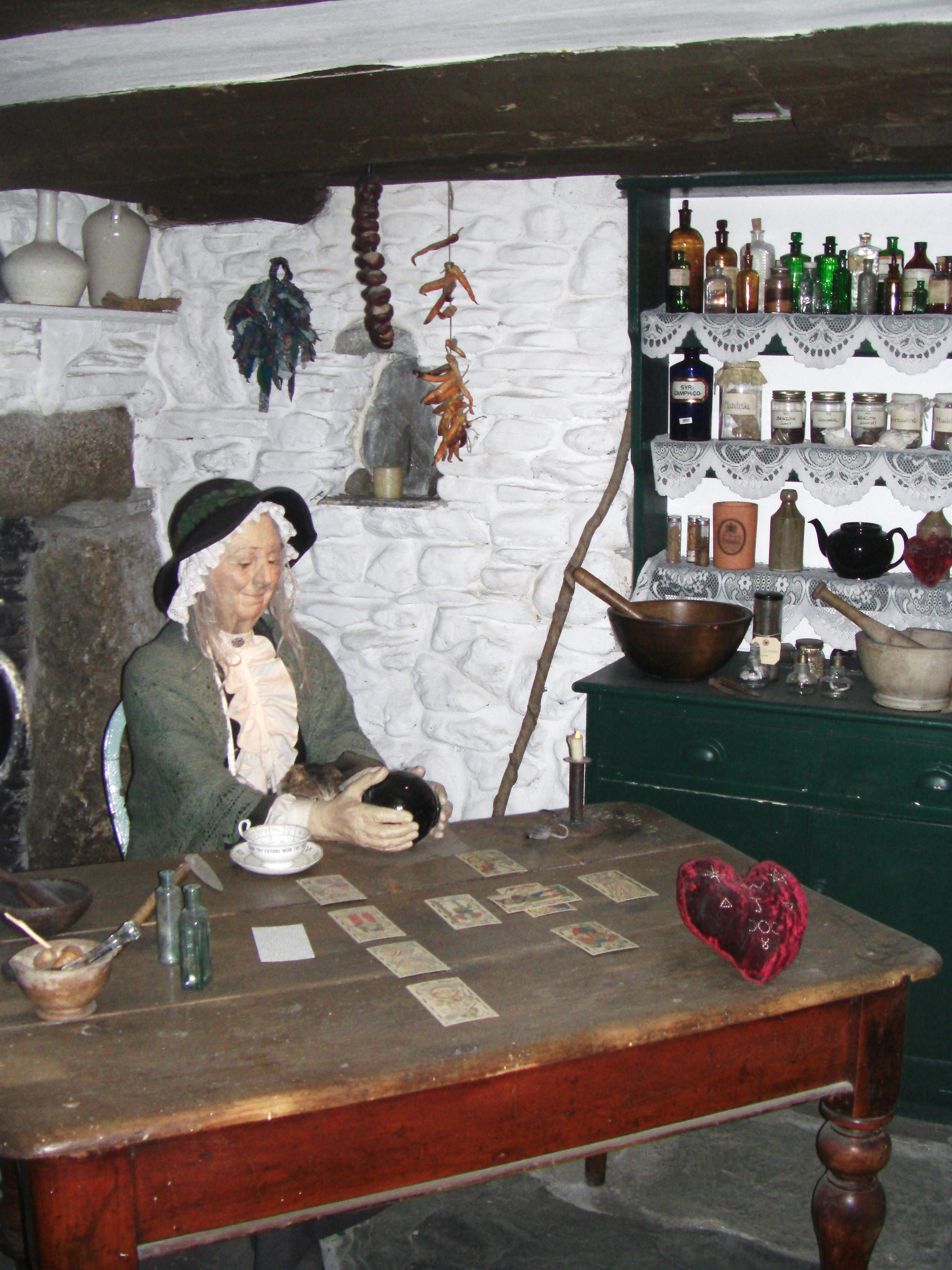
Model of a cunning woman at the museum

In keeping with Williamson's original plan, most of the exhibits in the museum feature artefacts related to historical folk magic and the cunning folk. This includes a room which recreates a tradition cunning woman's cottage, termed "Joan's cottage", with a mannequin of a nineteenth century cunning woman, surrounded by various herbs and divination tools. The museum also contains exhibits devoted to the witch trials in the early modern period, the modern Pagan religion of Wicca, as well as other esoteric practices such as ceremonial magic, Freemasonry, and alchemy. There is also a small case on modern religious Satanism, in which a distinction is drawn between it and modern Pagan witchcraft.

A number of artefacts in the collection were owned by prominent figures in the history of magic and witchcraft; it contains a ritual chalice used by the Thelemite magician Aleister Crowley, talismans created by Gerald Gardner, and ritual swords and an altar slab formerly owned by the noted Wiccan Alex Sanders. The museum's collection of artefacts continues to grow with new acquisitions. Many contemporary practitioners of witchcraft and magic have bequeathed their working tools to the museum in their wills. According to the anthropologist Helen Cornish, the exhibits in the museum "work to build narratives that illustrate witchcraft over time, and situate it as a significant force in the present".

== Reception ==
In The Encyclopedia of Witches, Witchcraft and Wicca, Rosemary Ellen Guiley described it as the "world's largest collection of paraphernalia and artifacts related to folk magic, witchcraft, Wicca and ritual magic". The museum functions as an information resource centre for media and the public. An independent organisation, the Friends of the Museum of Witchcraft, operates to raise funds through which to purchase further items for the collection. It also acts as a meeting place for Wiccans and other Pagans.

According to Doyle White, the museum has become "something akin to a site of pilgrimage" for British Witches, with a "special and irreplaceable place in the hearts of many in the British occult community." Cornish conducted ethnographic research among the local Witches who had relationships with the museum in the late 1990s and early 2000s. She found that there were mixed views on aspects of the museum. Commenting on the "Joan's cottage" room, she found that some Witches felt that it provided "a marker of historical identification, and illustrates the ways that independent, rural magical workers provide a central focus and source of heritage, while for others it indicates an ongoing problem of romanticized historical invention." Various practitioners interviewed by Cornish were sceptical about the claims that Williamson had made for many of the artefacts which he placed on exhibit, questioning whether there was sufficient evidence to warrant their continued display.

== See also ==
- American Museum of Magic
