= Mabel Besant-Scott =

British philosopher (1870–1952)

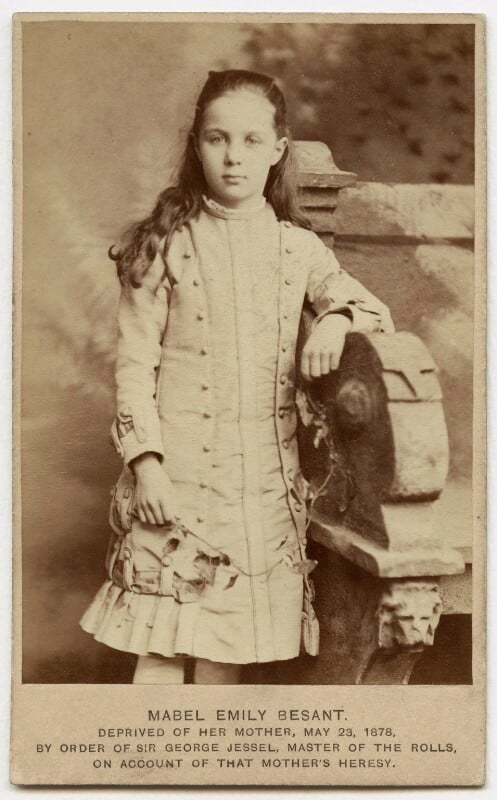
Besant-Scott, c. 1878

Mabel "Mabs" Emily Besant-Scott (née Besant; 28 August 1870, Leckhampton, Cheltenham – 22 May 1952, Folkestone, Kent) was a Theosophist, Co-Freemason and Rosicrucian.

== Biography ==
She was the daughter of the Theosophist, Secularist, and Co-Freemason Annie Besant and her husband Rev. Frank Besant. She had an older brother named Arthur Besant. When her father and mother separated, she was to be under the custody of her mother, but in 1878 her father went to the High Court and won the case for custody. It was not until she was 21 that she returned to her mother.

In 1892 Mabel married a journalist named Ernest Scott at Marylebone, London. They emigrated to Australia where she had a daughter, Muriel and became a Roman Catholic. She returned to England with Muriel in 1909 but Scott did not sue for divorce until 1915. For some time she assisted her mother in both British Co-Masonry and the Theosophical Society Adyar.

After her mother's death, Mabel Besant-Scott briefly became the head of the British Federation of Co-Freemasonry and held the highest thirty third degree in Scottish Rite Freemasonry. In 1933 she visited India where her mother died and met the Avatar Meher Baba, where they discussed her mother resurrecting as a man in India. She wrote several articles for The Adyar Bulletin, a periodical of the Theosophical Society based in Adyar, India. A year later she abruptly resigned from Co-Freemasonry, joining the Rosicrucian Order Crotona Fellowship shortly afterwards and taking with her some of her followers from Co-Masonry. She was one of the most active members of this Rosicrucian theatre near Christchurch, which was led by George Alexander Sullivan.

In The Rebirth of Witchcraft by Doreen Valiente and Witchcraft Today: An Encyclopedia of Wiccan and Neopagan Traditions by James R. Lewis, the authors connect the ceremonies Gerald Gardner devised as being a neighbour to Besant Scott.

Besant-Scott's portrait is in the collection of the National Portrait Gallery London.
