= Frederic Lamond =

Frederic Lamond may refer to:

- Frederic Lamond (pianist) (1868–1948), Scottish pianist and composer
- Frederic Lamond (Wiccan) (1931–2020), Wiccan writer and member of the Bricket Wood coven
