= Somerford, Dorset =

Coordinates: 50.7400°N 1.7467°W

Somerford
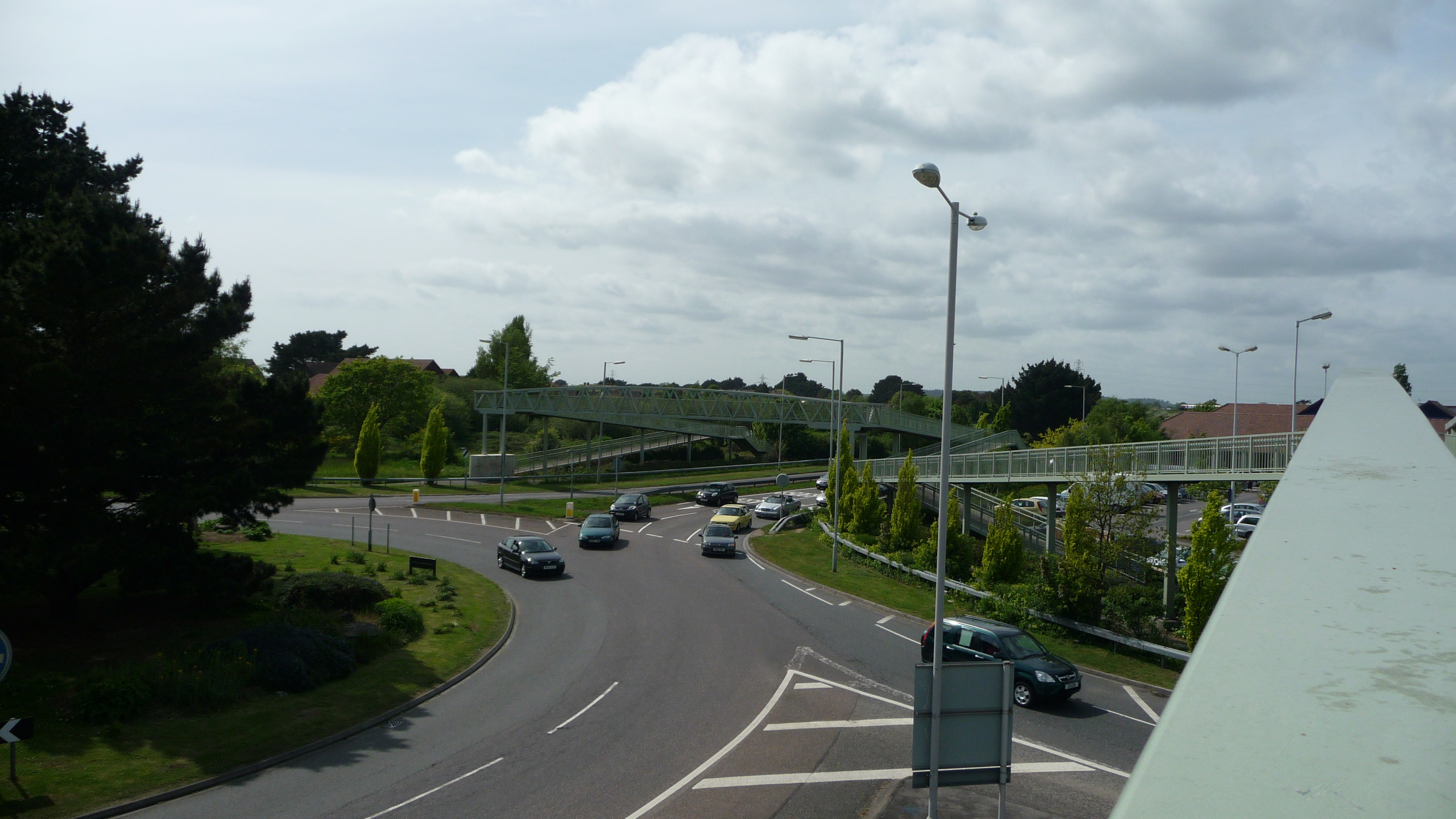
- Somerford Roundabout

- Location within Dorset
- OS grid reference: SZ1793
- Unitary authority: Bournemouth, Christchurch and Poole
- Ceremonial county: Dorset
- Region: South West
- Country: England
- Sovereign state: United Kingdom
- Post town: CHRISTCHURCH
- Postcode district: BH23
- Dialling code: 01202 or 01425
- Police: Dorset
- Fire: Dorset and Wiltshire
- Ambulance: South Western
- UK Parliament: Christchurch

Somerford is a district of Christchurch in the Bournemouth, Christchurch and Poole district of Dorset, England. It borders with Mudeford and is intersected by the Somerford Road (B3059). On the north side is an area of residential housing, originally developed as a council estate in the 1950s. The district has three schools: Somerford Infants, Somerford Junior and The Grange School. The present day biggest employer is BAE Systems (previously as Plessey). Historically, the biggest employers were Airspeed, de Havilland and Gardner's.

== Origin of name ==
Somerford was named after a ford over the River Mude which was only passable in summertime. Its approximate site is that of the current day Somerford Roundabout.

== Manor, grange, fishpond and farm ==
Historically, Somerford was a manor extending from the east side of Christchurch Harbour in the west to Chewton in the east. It is first mentioned in a document dated AD 1140 which confirmed the grant of the estate to Christchurch Priory. The manor included the hamlets of Bure, Chewton, Street, Stanpit, Hoburne and Clive (Highcliffe). The manor formed the grange of the Priory and was also the residence of the Abbot. The medieval settlement of Somerford was probably situated close to the grange which was itself probably located approximately 250m south of the current day Somerford Roundabout. The 1st edition OS map shows a fishpond which may represent a medieval monastic feature. Somerford Grange and Somerford Farm were held separately from each other following the dissolution of Christchurch Priory and survived until 1935 when they were demolished to make way for the airfield.

== Christchurch Airfield ==
Christchurch Airfield was located southeast of the A337/B3059 intersection in Somerford.

It was a civil airfield starting from 1926, then it was used during World War II by the Royal Air Force and the United States Army Air Forces Ninth Air Force. After the war the airfield returned to civilian use and the airfield complex was then demolished in 1966.

== Gardner's ==
Cecil Gardner had already made a name for himself manufacturing radio sets, recharging accumulators and ac/dc transformers from a small factory in Southbourne; When in 1939 he moved into a purpose built factory in Somerford Road, Christchurch. He soon had plenty of business making transformers for American pilots who needed to convert the British 240 volt supply to the 110 volt they were using, and lighting transformers for air raid shelters. Gardner's also won contracts with the Telecommunications Research Establishment and the Ministry of Aircraft Production. After the war, contracts from the Admiralty and the Atomic Energy Research Establishment allowed the business to grow and Gardner's were soon employing around 300 people. Gardner's contributed to the local economy not just because it was a major employer but also because it attracted others to the area such as Penny and Giles (potentiometers) and Plessey Defence Systems who came to take advantage of the local skilled workforce. The factory closed in the late 1990s partly due to an increase in cheap imports.

== Ashrama Hall and Christchurch Garden Theatre ==
A local group of the Rosicrucian Order Crotona Fellowship was formed in Christchurch in 1930. The local group’s headquarters was a wooden building named the Ashrama Hall, completed in 1936 in the garden of a house owned by Catherine Emily Chalk on the corner of Somerford Way and Somerford Road. In 1938, on the same land, the group built the Christchurch Garden Theatre in Somerford Way. It was capable of seating 360 people. At the theatre’s official opening it was described not only as the first Rosicrucian theatre in England but the first theatre in the borough of Christchurch. It presented mystically-themed plays, written by George Alexander Sullivan under his journalistic pen-name Alex Matthews. Among the Rosicrucian Players was a small group who formed a coven of witches (New Forest coven). Gerald Gardner, a retired colonial civil servant, joined them after moving to Highcliffe in 1938. Gardner went on to take a leading role in the modern revival of witchcraft - often referred to as Wicca. The theatre was never popular and closed shortly after Sullivan’s death in 1942. It was then used as a training centre for de Havilland. The theatre was destroyed by fire in 1975.

== Politics ==
Somerford is part of the Christchurch parliamentary constituency for elections to the House of Commons. It is currently represented by Conservative MP Christopher Chope.
