= The Grange School, Christchurch =

The Grange School

Location
- Redvers Road; Somerford; Christchurch, Dorset, BH23 3AU; England; 50°44′28″N 1°45′22″W

Information
- Type: Academy
- Established: 1955
- Local authority: Bournemouth, Christchurch and Poole
- Trust: Twynham Learning Federation
- Department for Education URN: 141378 Tables
- Ofsted: Reports
- Head of School: Deborah Hawkins
- Gender: Co-educational
- Age: 11 to 18
- Website: https://www.thegrangeschool.com/

The Grange School is a co-educational secondary school and sixth form located in the Somerford area of Christchurch in the English county of Dorset. The school mainly admits pupils from the Somerford, Mudeford & Burton areas.

== History ==
The school opened in 1955 as Somerford Secondary Modern School and became The Grange in 1969 when it went comprehensive, at the time Christchurch being in Hampshire until 1974 when it became part of Dorset, the school becoming part of Dorset LEA.

The school converted to academy status on 1 February 2015 and is now part of the Twynham Learning multi-academy trust. In the summer of 2021 The Grange School underwent a significant restructure formalising its relationship with Twynham School. The Twynham Learning offices relocated to The Grange School campus along with the successful BDP SCITT and the professional development hub, Two Rivers Institute. In December 2021 The Grange School was judged to be "good" in all areas by Ofsted.

== Notable former pupils ==
- Miles Gibson, novelist
