= Jack L. Bracelin =

British Wiccan (1926–1981)

Jack Leon Bracelin
- Born: 2 June 1926; Edmonton, Essex, England
- Died: 28 July 1981 (aged 55); St Albans, Hertfordshire, England
- Occupations: Nightclub owner, nudist club owner, Wiccan priest

Jack Leon Bracelin (2 June 1926 – 28 July 1981) was an English high priest of Gardnerian Wicca. He was an influential figure in the early history of Wicca and was an early member of Gerald Gardner's Bricket Wood coven.

== Early life ==
Jack Leon Bracelin was born 2 June 1926 in the Edmonton registration district of Essex, England. He was a son of Leon Enrique Bracelin and his wife Gertrude Alice Bunyard.

His parents were married on 11 February 1922 in St. Mark's Church in Peckham, Surrey (Southwark). His father was an Engineer.

In everyday life and in the books that mentioned him, he was known as "Jack Bracelin".

The Bracelin family originally came from Ireland. One family tree on Ancestry.com has what would be Jack Bracelin's Great Great Grandfather, a William Bracelin being born in 1791 Ireland and died in 1861 in Cumberland, England.

J. L. Bracelin was in the Palestine Police department for the period of 19 February 1947 to 16 November 1947 and was awarded a medal for the service. (From the original record) Name of Department - Police. Roll Original: Number: 1475 - Rank: B/Const - Name: Bracelin J. L. - Full period of Qualifying service in Palestine, From: 19.2.47 - To: 16.11.47. This was shortly before the end of the British Mandate in Palestine.

Prior to being initiated into the craft, Bracelin had worked for the British police in Palestine and had later worked for a paint company.

== Wicca ==
In 1956, Bracelin was initiated into Wicca through the Bricket Wood coven.

In 1959 Bracelin met the Sufi writer and practitioner Idries Shah at a table in the Cosmo Restaurant in Swiss Cottage, North London. Shah was interested in Wicca, and Bracelin introduced him to Gardner. Shah wrote Gardner's official biography, Gerald Gardner: Witch, which was published by his own company, Octagon Press, in 1960. However, he used Bracelin's name as a pseudonym because he did not want to cause confusion amongst his Sufi students and friends as to his interest in a different religion.

Bracelin was one of the beneficiaries of Gardner's estate at his death, along with Monique Wilson and Patricia Crowther. Bracelin himself inherited enough of the naturist club that he could take it over.

== Post-Wicca ==
Bracelin later resigned from being the Bricket Wood coven's High Priest, and soon left the coven itself, because, according to coven member Frederic Lamond, "he asked himself whether the Book of Shadows' simplified ceremonial magic rituals expressed his own religious feelings, and concluded they did not". In 1966 he married a young woman in a ceremony held in a Roman Catholic church, which many members of the Wica felt showed that he had turned his back on the craft.

However, Bracelin continued to allow the coven to meet at the Witches' cottage, on the condition that they paid rent on the plot of land upon which it was situated. In 1975, Bracelin tried to get them to pay for the nudist club's electricity as well, which the coven members were unwilling to do, and so they sold their plot to another nudist.

Bracelin was a supporter of the hippie movement of the 1960s and 1970s, believing that it embodied the "life-affirming Goddess values" in its "true expression". Partially for this reason, he opened a disco in the West End of London, but it was a financial failure.

In June 1976, Bracelin, by then in financial difficulties, was forced to sell the nudist club, though the new owners agreed to pay him a small pension.

== Death ==
Bracelin died on 28 July 1981 in the St. Albans registration district of Hertfordshire.>

From the Probate entry in the index is the following: "Bracelin, Jack Leon of Chalet Suntan Fiveacres Country Club Fiveacres Avenue Bricket Wood Herts died 28 July 1981 Probate Oxford 14 January 1982." (the actual record is coming soon, will add more later)
