= Lois Bourne =

British occultist (1928–2017)

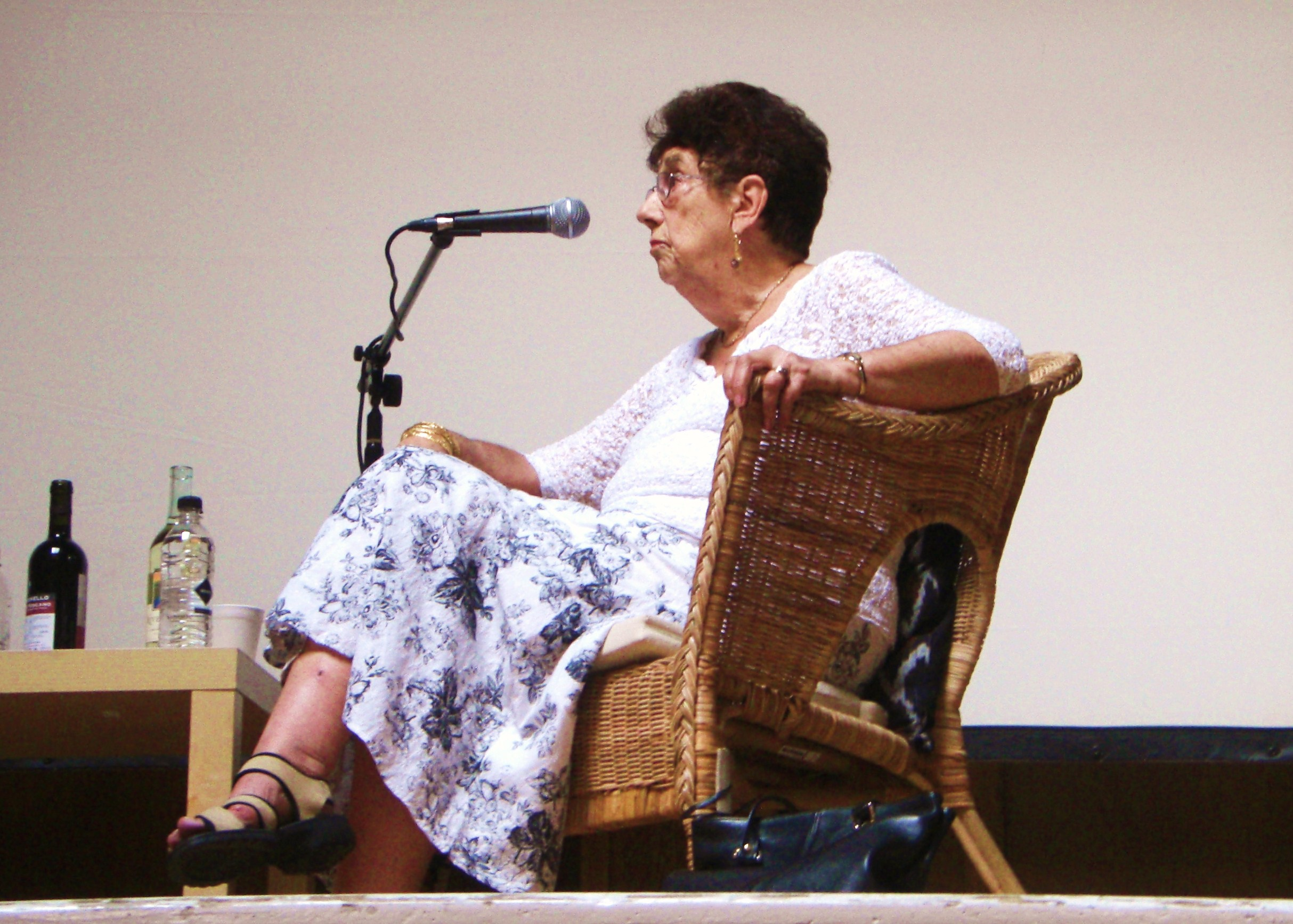
- Bourne in 2010
- Title: High priestess

Personal life
- Born: 10 April 1928
- Died: 22 December 2017 (aged 89) Hertfordshire, United Kingdom
- Home town: Hertfordshire
- Other name: Tanith

Religious life
- Religion: Wicca
- Temple: Bricket Wood coven
- Sect: Gardnerian Wicca

Lois Bourne (10 April 1928 – 22 December 2017) who also went under the craft name Tanith, was an influential figure in the Neopagan religion of Wicca, having been involved in it from the early 1960s, and wrote a number of books on the subject. Originally initiated into Gardnerian Wicca by Gerald Gardner, she rose to become the high priestess of the Bricket Wood coven, the first Wiccan coven started by Gerald Gardner, which was based in Bricket Wood in Hertfordshire, working alongside the high priest Jack Bracelin.

Kirkus Reviews described her book Witch Amongst Us - The Autobiography of a Witch as "...sanely written and, in many ways, it is a convincing story of her life as a witch."

Bourne died at the age of 89 in Watford, England on Friday night, 22 December 2017, after a long battle with Alzheimer's disease.

== Bibliography ==
- Witch Amongst Us - the Autobiography of a Witch (1979; republished 1989) ISBN 0-7090-3761-9
- Conversations with a Witch (1989; republished 2002) ISBN 978-0-7090-7064-1
- Dancing with Witches (1998; republished 2006) ISBN 0-7090-8074-3
- Spells to Change Your Life (2003) ISBN 978-1-904435-10-5
