= George Alexander Sullivan =

George Alexander Sullivan (1890–1942) was the founder of the Rosicrucian Order Crotona Fellowship.

Born in 1890 in Liverpool, Sullivan is believed to have organized a group named the Order of Twelve from 1911–1914 and again from 1920. In about 1924 it became known as the Rosicrucian Order Crotona Fellowship (Crotona was the site of Pythagoras's school in southern Italy). As a journalist, playwright and actor George Alexander Sullivan used the name Alex Mathews; in the context of his mystical activities he used the name Frater Aureolis. From 1925–1928 he put out a periodical, The Rosicrucian Gazette. The ROCF operated first from Liverpool area of England and then from the mid-1930s onwards from the Christchurch area.

The group's headquarters was a wooden building called the Ashrama Hall, completed in 1936 on the grounds of Catherine Chalk's house on Somerford Road near Christchurch, England. Peter Caddy became one of Sullivan's disciples in 1936, introduced by his then brother-in-law Cyril "Jim" Barnes. Similar to the later Findhorn Foundation, Sullivan's disciples began to buy bungalows close by his Ashrama Hall.

With Mabel Besant-Scott, George Alexander Sullivan organized a Rosicrucian theatre company. In 1938, also on Catherine Chalk's land, they built Christchurch Garden Theatre, which called itself "The First Rosicrucian Theater in England". It presented Sullivan's mystically-themed plays during June–September 1938. Gerald Gardner (1884–1964), the reviver of British witchcraft ("Wicca"), claimed to have been initiated into traditional witchcraft through contacts he made at the Rosicrucian theatre, though there is some debate about this. Gerald Gardner's biography by Jack Bracelin (although said by Frederic Lamond to have been written by Idries Shah) mentions the group. Although the group named itself after the Rosicrucian tradition, and although its rituals had a Masonic flavour to them, the teachings of George Alexander Sullivan — at least as given by Peter Caddy — resemble most of all the teachings of the New Thought movement. George Alexander Sullivan died in 1942.
