= Witchcraft Today =

Book by Gerald Gardner

- First edition cover
- Author: Gerald Gardner
- Language: English
- Genre: History; Folklore; Wicca
- Publisher: Rider and Company
- Publication date: 1954
- Publication place: United Kingdom

Witchcraft Today is a non-fiction book written by Gerald Gardner. Published in 1954, Witchcraft Today recounts Gardner's thoughts on the history and practices of the theoretical witch-cult, and his claim to have met practising witches in 1930s England. It is based on the discredited Witch-cult hypothesis which argued that persecuted witches had actually been followers of a surviving pagan religion. It also deals with his theory that the Knights Templar had practised the religion, and that the belief in faeries in ancient, mediaeval and early modern Europe is due to a secretive pygmy race that lived alongside humans. Witchcraft Today is one of the foundational texts for the religion of Wicca, along with Gardner's second book on the subject, 1959's The Meaning of Witchcraft.

Gerald Gardner in the foreword to Witchcraft Today:

I have been told by witches in England: "Write and tell people we are not perverts. We are decent people, we only want to be left alone, but there are certain secrets that you mustn't give away." So after some arguments as to exactly what I must not reveal, I am permitted to tell much that has never before been made public concerning their beliefs, their rituals and their reasons for what they do; also to emphasize that neither their present beliefs, rituals nor practices are harmful.

Whilst by the time of writing, Gardner had been initiated into the religion, and had formed his own coven, he did not state this in the book. Instead he "posed as a disinterested anthropologist". The introduction to the book was written by Margaret Murray, the main proponent of the discredited witch-cult hypothesis in the 1920s and 1930s. In her introduction, she stated:

Dr Gardner has shown in his book how much of the so-called "witchcraft" is descended from ancient rituals, and has nothing to do with spell-casting and other evil practices, but is the sincere expression of that feeling towards God which is expressed, perhaps more decorously though not more sincerely, by modern Christianity in church services."

In the book Gardner also repeats the claim, which had originated with Matilda Joslyn Gage, that 9 million victims were killed in the European witch-hunts." Current scholarly estimates of the number of people executed for witchcraft during this time period vary between about 40,000 and 100,000.

The book contains seven photographs; one depicting the author, another a magician's circle at the Museum of Magic and Witchcraft, a memorial to those killed in the witch hunts, two further images of rooms in the museum, a statue of a horned god, and a painting of a male witch."

== Publication history ==
The book was initially published in hardback in November 1954 by Rider and Company, and sold at the price of 15 shillings. It was reprinted in August 1956.

== Analysis ==
In his biography of Gardner, the researcher Philip Heselton noted that the contents of Witchcraft Today were essentially a summation of what Gardner had read about witchcraft and other related subjects over a number of years. He remarked that Gardner had probably intended to provide a history of the 'witch-cult' from the Stone Age to the present which made reference to related religious movements, such as those of the druids, Knights Templar and ancient Egyptians. Summing the book up, he described it as "a record of Gardner's phases of enthusiasm".
