= Bricket Wood coven =

Historical witches' coven

Coordinates: 51.7113°N 0.36895°W

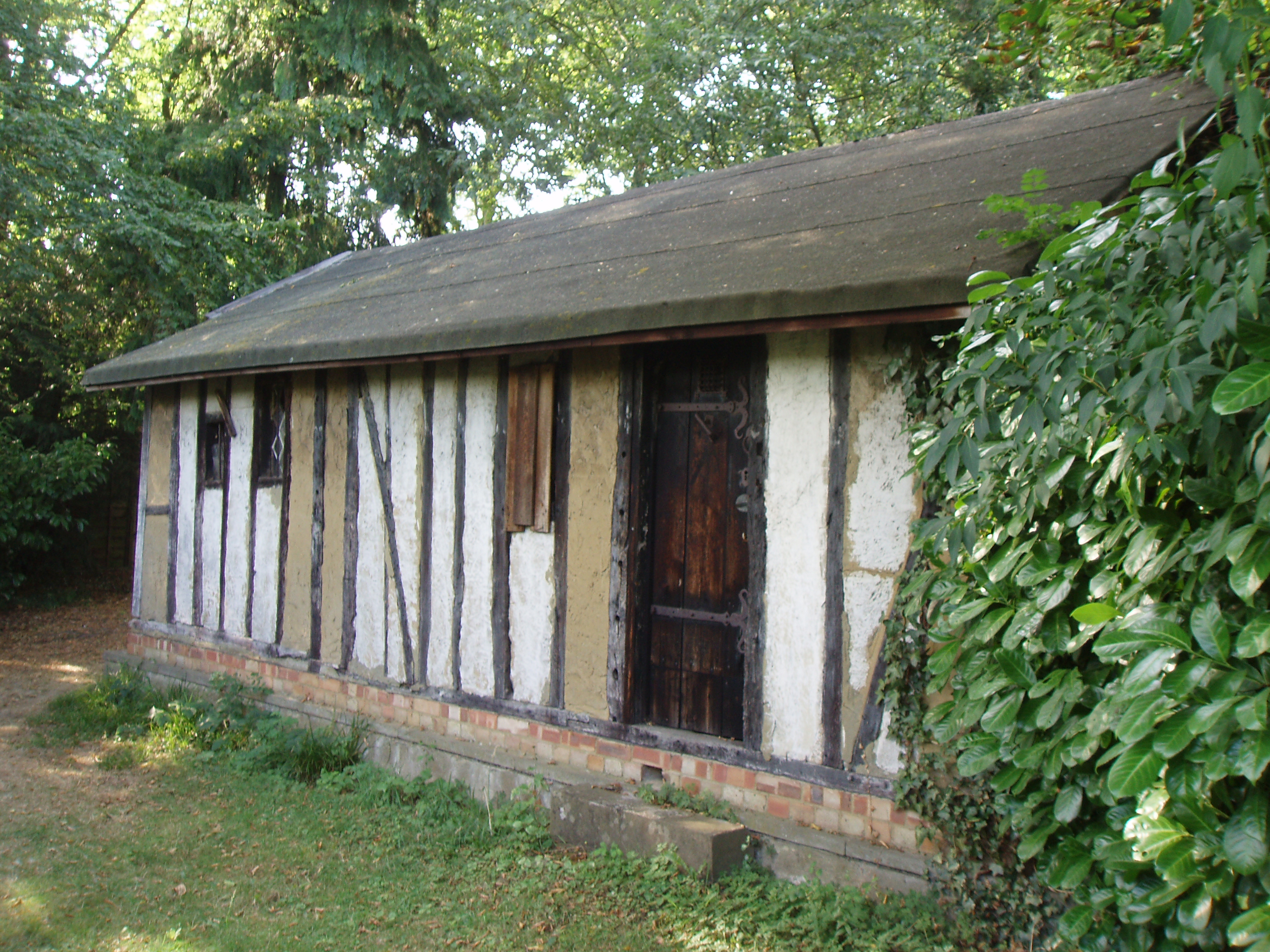
The Witches' Cottage in 2006.

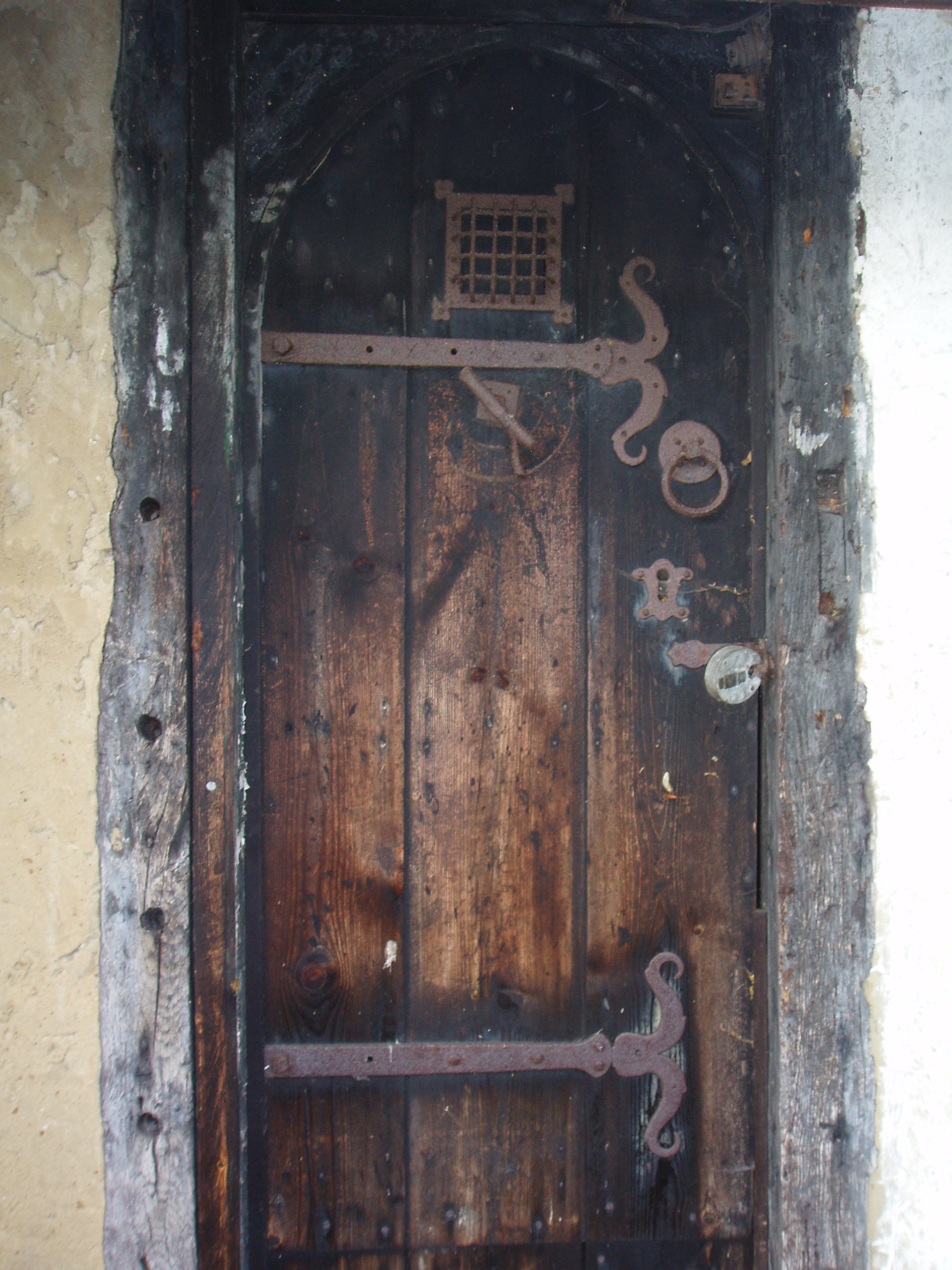
Close up of door.

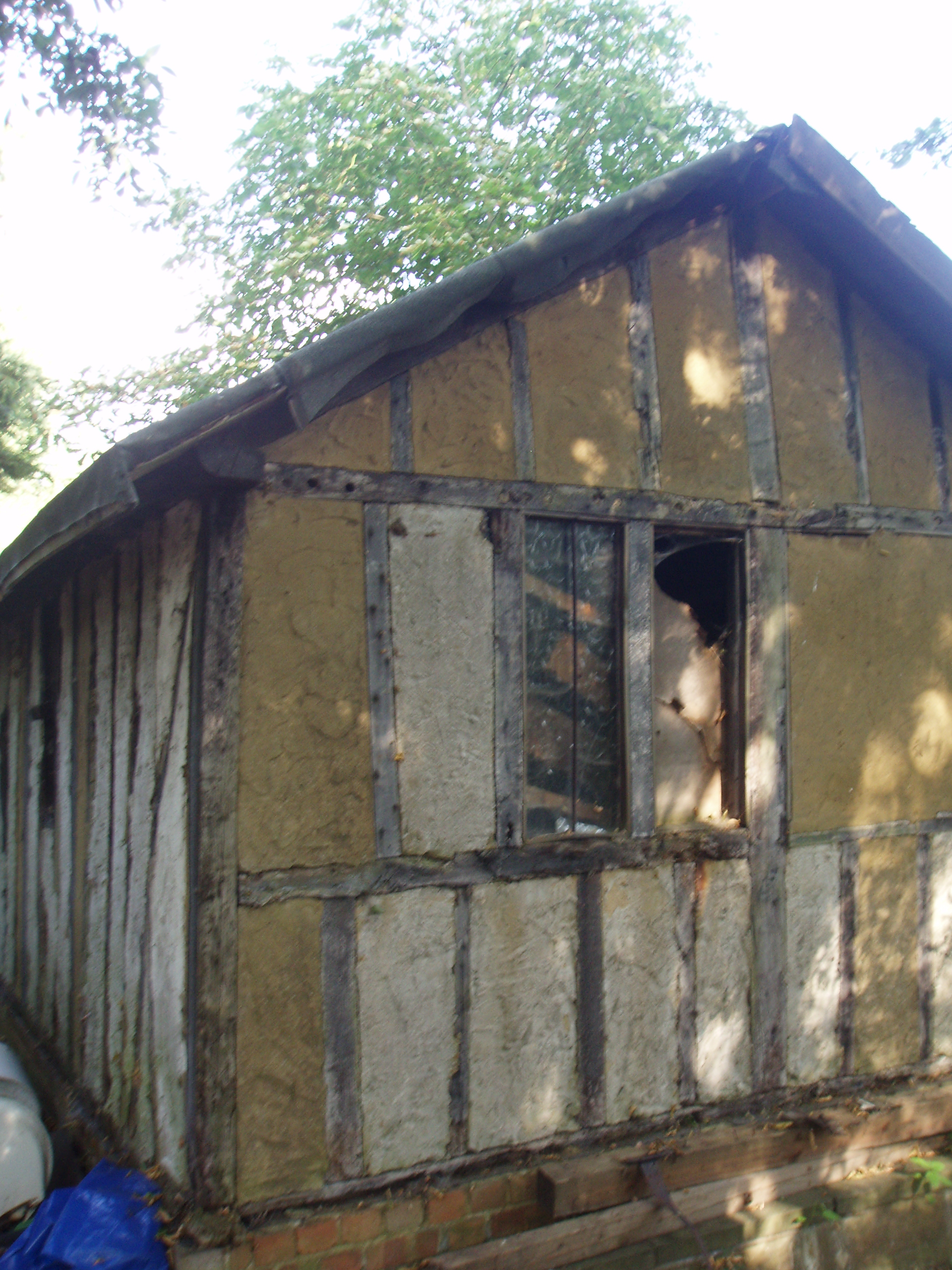
End view.

The Witches' Cottage, where the Bricket Wood coven met to celebrate the sabbats and esbats

The Bricket Wood coven, or Hertfordshire coven is a coven of Gardnerian witches founded in the 1940s by Gerald Gardner. It is notable for being the first coven in the Gardnerian line, though having its supposed origins in the pre-Gardnerian New Forest coven. The coven formed after Gardner bought a plot at the Fiveacres Country Club, a naturist club in the village of Bricket Wood, Hertfordshire, southern England, and met within the club's grounds. It played a significant part in the history of the neopagan religion of Wicca.

Many important and influential figures in Wicca were once members of the coven, including Dafo, Doreen Valiente, Jack Bracelin, Fred Lamond, Dayonis and Lois Bourne. The coven is still active today, though it maintains secrecy and its history was only known up until the 1970s.

== History ==
=== 1940s ===
Gardner founded the coven in the village of Bricket Wood around 1946 after moving to London from Highcliffe on the South Coast near the New Forest with his wife Donna. Gardner claimed to have been initiated into the New Forest coven, where he learned the mysteries and practices of the witchcraft religion. Gardner, fearing that the "Old Religion", as he called it, would die out, decided to form a new coven near to his new home, where he could initiate more people into the craft and keep it alive.

Gardner acted as the coven's High Priest, with Dafo acting as High Priestess. She had also been a member of the New Forest coven. Dafo remained a member of the coven until she left it by late 1952, annoyed at Gardner for seeking publicity.

Gardner gained several members to the coven, all of whom were either members of the Fiveacres naturist club or were already witches, although Donna, Gardner's wife, never got involved, having no interest in witchcraft. They held their meetings on the grounds of the local wooded Fiveacres nudist club, which Gardner had purchased a small plot at in 1945. He was himself not interested in running the club, and as such appointed an administrator to take on the job.

Gardner re-assembled what he called "The Witches' Cottage" on a plot of land which he owned in the club grounds. The small cottage was decorated with magical sigils on the inside. He had purchased this building from a friend, the Freemason John S.M. Ward, who was a pioneer of the restoration of historical buildings. It was within this 16th-century cottage that Ward had found near to Ledbury, Herefordshire that the coven assembled to perform their rituals.

=== 1950s ===
==== Doreen Valiente, 1953–1957 ====
Doreen Valiente, whom Gardner had initiated into the craft at Midsummer 1953 at the home of Dafo in the New Forest, joined the coven, and rose to become High Priestess.

In 1956, Jack Bracelin was initiated into the coven. He became a favourite of Gardner, who gave him the job of running the Fiveacres club after sacking the previous administrator, who "had deliberately run the club at a loss by setting unrealistically high requirements for membership, hoping thereby to persuade Gerald to eventually sell him the club at a low price". The sacked administrator had felt scorned, and convinced the president of the Central Council of British Naturism, Ernest Stanley, that the club was a cover for witchcraft, and that they should not be allowed membership to the CCOBN. Hoping to help Jack and Gardner's club out, the coven performed a ritual, and the situation was resolved.

In the mid-1950s, Gardner began to encourage more publicity, something which annoyed many coven members. In 1957, Valiente and several other coven members confronted Gardner over this, claiming that they should have a set of rules to regulate such a thing. Gardner, in response, brought about the Wiccan Laws (not to be confused with the Wiccan Rede), which offended Valiente, and in 1957 she and many of the group's older members left to form their own coven.

The split-off coven asked if they could continue to use the Witches' Cottage for their rituals, but in a letter Gardner replied that:

There is an ancient lore dating back to the Burning Times that for security reasons no witch coven may meet less than 25 miles from another witch coven's meeting place.

Gardner was left with a much younger coven, composed of Thelma Capel (Dayonis), her then partner Jack Bracelin, Fred Lamond, a hospital anaesthetist, and a new initiate.

==== Dayonis, 1958–1959 ====
With Valiente gone, Dayonis took over as the high priestess of the coven in January 1958. With Dayonis in charge, Gardner asked her to immediately initiate anyone who asked into the craft, in contrast with his former belief that prospective candidates should wait for a year and a day before initiation. One such of these new fast-tracked initiates was Fred Lamond, who was initiated only four months after meeting the coven for the first time. Gardner also insisted on the initiation of Eleanor Bone, despite the fact that the coven members felt that they "simply couldn't circle with her" because of differences in exuberance. Within a month, Gardner had brought about her 2nd and 3rd initiations, and set her up as the High Priestess of a new coven, independent of the Bricket Wood one.

In spring 1958, whilst Gardner was away from the coven staying at his museum on the Isle of Man, the other members decided that they did not want to continue using only binding and scourging to raise energies, and so they tried to do so by the circle dance method, which most found to be more effective than Gardner's preferred methods. At the same time, the group decided that they wanted to celebrate the solstices and the equinoxes as well as the cross-quarter days (the coven at the time called them Halloween, Candlemass, Beltane and Lammas). Gardner gave his written permission for this, and it was adopted by other practitioners of the craft, such as Doreen Valiente. This was the beginning of the belief in the Wiccan Wheel of the Year.

Dayonis moved to Canada in October 1959, and Lois Bourne became the coven's high priestess.

== See also ==
- Wiccan organisation
