= Gerald Gardner =

British Wiccan leader (1884–1964)

- Born: Gerald Brosseau Gardner; 13 June 1884; Blundellsands, Lancashire, England
- Died: 12 February 1964 (aged 79) aboard ship, en route to Tunis
- Occupations: Tea and rubber planter; customs officer; Wiccan priest; writer; novelist
- Spouse: Dorothy Rosedale

Gerald Brosseau Gardner (13 June 1884 – 12 February 1964), also known by the craft name Scire, was an English Wiccan, author, and amateur anthropologist and archaeologist. He was instrumental in bringing the modern pagan religion of Wicca to public attention, writing some of its definitive religious texts and founding the tradition of Gardnerian Wicca.

Born into an upper-middle-class family in Blundellsands, Lancashire, Gardner spent much of his childhood abroad in Madeira. In 1900, he moved to colonial Ceylon. In 1911, he relocated to Malaya, where he worked as a civil servant. Independently, he developed an interest in the native peoples, writing papers, and even a book about their magical practices.

After his retirement in 1936, he travelled to Cyprus and penned the novel A Goddess Arrives before returning to England. Settling down near the New Forest, he joined an occult group, the Rosicrucian Order Crotona Fellowship. Through this group, he encountered the New Forest coven into which he was initiated in 1939. Gardner portrayed the coven as a survival of the theoretical "witch-cult" discussed in the works of Margaret Murray—a theory that is now discredited. He supplemented the coven's rituals with ideas borrowed from Freemasonry, ceremonial magic, and the writings of Aleister Crowley to form the Gardnerian tradition of Wicca.

Moving to London in 1945, he became intent on propagating this religion, attracting media attention and writing about it in High Magic's Aid (1949), Witchcraft Today (1954), and The Meaning of Witchcraft (1959). Founding a Wiccan group known as the Bricket Wood coven, he introduced a string of High Priestesses into the religion, including Doreen Valiente, Lois Bourne, Patricia Crowther and Eleanor Bone, through which the Gardnerian community spread throughout Britain and subsequently into Australia and the United States in the late 1950s and early 1960s. Involved for a time with Cecil Williamson, Gardner also became director of the Museum of Magic and Witchcraft on the Isle of Man, which he ran until his death. Gardner's role in the development of neo-pagan and occult communities was such that a plaque on his gravestone describes him "The Father of Wicca".

== Early life ==
=== Childhood: 1884–1899 ===
Gardner's family was wealthy and upper middle class, running a family firm, Joseph Gardner and Sons, which described itself as "the oldest private company in the timber trade within the British Empire." Specialising in the import of hardwood, the company had been founded in the mid-18th century by Edmund Gardner (b. 1721), an entrepreneur who would subsequently become a Freeman of Liverpool.

Gerald's father, William Robert Gardner (1844–1935) had been the youngest son of Joseph Gardner (b. 1791), after whom the firm had been renamed, and who with his wife Maria had had five sons and three daughters. In 1867, William had been sent to New York City to further the interests of the family firm. Here, he had met an American, Louise Burguelew Ennis, the daughter of a wholesale stationer; entering a relationship, they were married in Manhattan on 25 November 1868.

After a visit to England, the couple returned to the US, where they settled in Mott Haven, Morrisania in New York State. It was here that their first child, Harold Ennis Gardner, was born in 1870. At some point in the next two years they moved back to England, by 1873 settling into The Glen, a large Victorian house in Blundellsands in Lancashire, north-west England, which was developing into a wealthy suburb of Liverpool. It was here that their second child, Robert "Bob" Marshall Gardner, was born in 1874.

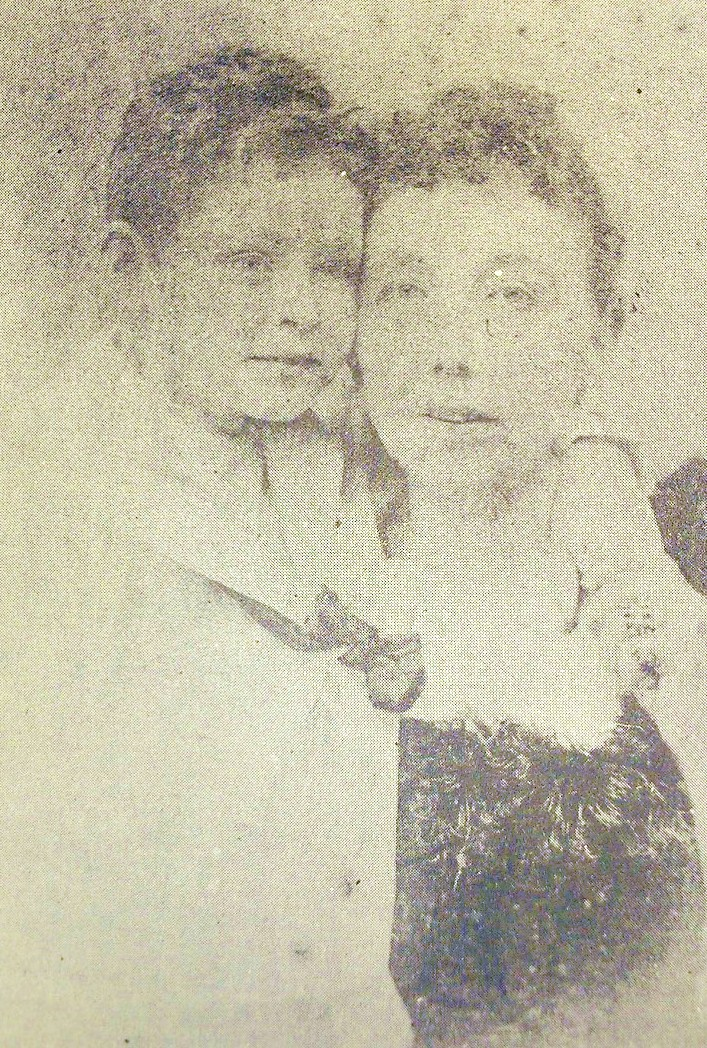
Gardner with his Irish nursemaid, Com, during the 1880s

In 1876 the family moved into one of the neighbouring houses, Ingle Lodge, and it was here that the couple's third son, Gerald Brosseau Gardner, was born on Friday 13 June 1884. A fourth child, Francis Douglas Gardner, was then born in 1886. Gerald would rarely see Harold, who went on to study law at the University of Oxford, but saw more of Bob, who drew pictures for him, and Douglas, with whom he shared his nursery.

The Gardners employed an Irish nursemaid named Josephine "Com" McCombie, who was entrusted with taking care of the young Gerald; she would subsequently become the dominant figure of his childhood, spending far more time with him than his parents. Gardner suffered with asthma from a young age, having particular difficulty in the cold Lancashire winters. His nursemaid offered to take him to warmer climates abroad at his father's expense in the hope that this condition would not be so badly affected.

Subsequently, in summer 1888, Gerald and Com travelled via London to Nice in the south of France. After several more years spent in the Mediterranean, in 1891 they went to the Canary Islands, and it was here that Gardner first developed his lifelong interest in weaponry. From there, they then went on to Accra in the Gold Coast (modern Ghana). Accra was followed by a visit to Funchal on the Portuguese island of Madeira; they would spend most of the next nine years on the island, only returning to England for three or four months in the summer.

According to Gardner's first biographer, Jack Bracelin, Com was very flirtatious and "clearly looked on these trips as mainly manhunts", viewing Gardner as a nuisance. As a result, he was largely left to his own devices, which he spent going out, meeting new people and learning about foreign cultures. In Madeira, he also began collecting weapons, many of which were remnants from the Napoleonic Wars, displaying them on the wall of his hotel room.

As a result of his illness and these foreign trips, Gardner ultimately never attended school, or gained any formal education. He taught himself to read by looking at copies of The Strand Magazine but his writing betrayed his lack of formal schooling with eccentric spelling and grammar. A voracious reader, one of the books that most influenced him at the time was Florence Marryat's There Is No Death (1891), a discussion of spiritualism, and from which he gained a firm belief in the existence of an afterlife.

=== Ceylon and Borneo: 1900–1911 ===
In 1900, Com married David Elkington, one of her many suitors who owned a tea plantation in the British colony of Ceylon (modern Sri Lanka). It was agreed with the Gardners that Gerald would live with her on a tea plantation named Ladbroke Estate in the town of Maskeliya, where he could learn the tea trade. In 1901 Gardner and the Elkingtons lived briefly in a bungalow in Kandy, where a neighbouring bungalow had just been vacated by the occultists Aleister Crowley and Charles Henry Allan Bennett.

At his father's expense, Gardner trained as a "creeper", (Note: A creeper was an individual who was apprenticed to an experienced manager to learn the business of tea planting.) or trainee planter, learning all about the growing of tea; although he disliked the "dreary endlessness" of the work, he enjoyed being outdoors and near to the forests. He lived with the Elkingtons until 1904, when he moved into his own bungalow and began earning a living working on the Non Pareil tea estate below the Horton Plains. He spent much of his spare time hunting deer and trekking through the local forests, becoming acquainted with the Singhalese natives and taking a great interest in their Buddhist beliefs.

In December 1904, his parents and younger brother visited, with his father asking him to invest in a pioneering rubber plantation which Gardner was to manage; located near the village of Belihuloya, it was known as the Atlanta Estate, but allowed him a great deal of leisure time. Exploring his interest in weaponry, in 1907 Gardner joined the Ceylon Planters Rifle Corps, a local volunteer force composed of European tea and rubber planters intent on protecting their interests from foreign aggression or domestic insurrection.

In 1907 Gardner returned to Britain for several months' leave, spending time with his family and joining the Legion of Frontiersmen, a militia founded to repel the threat of German invasion. During his visit, Gardner spent time with family relations, the Sergenesons; Gardner became friendly with this side of his family, whom his Anglican parents avoided because they were Methodists.

According to Gardner, the Surgenesons talked about the paranormal with him; the patriarch of the family, Ted Surgeneson, believed that fairies were living in his garden and would say "I can often feel they're there, and sometimes I've seen them", though he readily admitted the possibility that it was all in his imagination. It was from the Sergenesons that Gardner discovered a family rumour that his grandfather, Joseph, had been a practising witch, after being converted to the practice by his mistress. Another unconfirmed family belief repeated by Gardner was that a Scottish ancestor, Grissell Gairdner, had been burned as a witch in Newburgh in 1610.

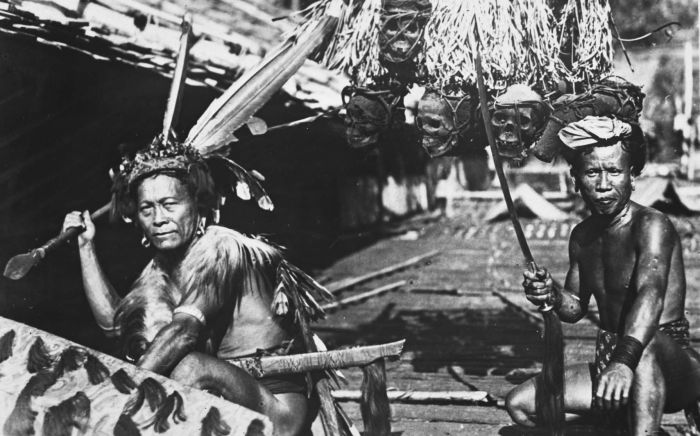
While working in Borneo in 1911, Gardner eschewed the racist attitudes of his colleagues by befriending members of the Dayak indigenous community, fascinated by their magico-religious beliefs, tattoos and displays of weaponry.

Gardner returned to Ceylon in late 1907 and settled down to the routine of managing the rubber plantation. In 1910 he was initiated as an Apprentice Freemason into the Sphinx Lodge No. 107 in Colombo, affiliated with the Irish Grand Lodge. Gardner placed great importance on this new activity; In order to attend masonic meetings, he had to arrange a weekend's leave, walk 15 miles to the nearest railway station in Haputale, and then catch a train to the city.

He entered into the second and third degrees of Freemasonry within the next month, but this enthusiasm seems also to have waned, and he resigned the next year, probably because he intended to leave Ceylon. The experiment with rubber growing at the Atlanta Estate had proved relatively unsuccessful, and Gardner's father decided to sell the property in 1911, leaving Gerald unemployed.

That year, Gardner moved to British North Borneo, gaining employment as a rubber planter at the Mawo Estate at Membuket. However, he did not get on well with the plantation's manager, a racist named R. J. Graham who had wanted to deforest the entire local area. Instead, Gardner became friendly with many of the locals, including the Dayak and Dusun people.

An amateur anthropologist, Gardner was fascinated by the indigenous way of life, particularly the local forms of weaponry such as the sumpitan. He was intrigued by the tattoos of the Dayaks and pictures of him in later life show large snake or dragon tattoos on his forearms, presumably obtained at this time. Taking a great interest in indigenous religious beliefs, Gardner told his first biographer that he had attended Dusun séances or healing rituals.

He was unhappy with the working conditions and the racist attitudes of his colleagues, and when he developed malaria he felt that this was the last straw; he left Borneo and moved to Singapore, in what was then known as the Straits Settlements, part of British Malaya.

=== Malaya and World War I: 1911–1926 ===
Arriving in Singapore, he initially planned to return to Ceylon, but was offered a job working as an assistant on a rubber plantation in Perak, northern Malaya, and decided to take it, working for the Borneo Company. Arriving in the area, he decided to supplement this income by purchasing his own estate, Bukit Katho, on which he could grow rubber; initially sized at 450 acres, Gardner purchased various pieces of adjacent land until it covered 600 acres.

Here, Gardner made friends with an American man known as Cornwall, who had converted to Islam and married a local Malay woman. Through Cornwall, Gardner was introduced to many locals, whom he soon befriended, including members of the Senoi and Malay peoples. Cornwall invited Gardner to make the Shahada, the Muslim confession of faith, which he did; it allowed him to gain the trust of locals, although he would never become a practising Muslim. Cornwall was however an unorthodox Muslim, and his interest in local peoples included their magical and spiritual beliefs, to which he also introduced Gardner, who took a particular interest in the kris, a ritual knife with magical uses.

In 1915, Gardner again joined a local volunteer militia, the Malay States Volunteer Rifles. Although between 1914 and 1918 World War I was raging in Europe, its effects were little felt in Malaya, apart from the 1915 Singapore Mutiny. Gardner was keen to do more towards the war effort and in 1916 once again returned to Britain. He attempted to join the Royal Navy but was turned down due to ill health. Unable to fight on the front lines, he began working as an orderly in the Voluntary Aid Detachment (VAD) in the First Western General Hospital, Fazakerley, located on the outskirts of Liverpool.

He was working in the VAD when casualties came back from the Battle of the Somme and he was engaged in looking after patients and assisting in changing wound dressings. He soon had to give this up when his malaria returned, and so decided to return to Malaya in October 1916 because of the warmer climate.

He continued to manage the rubber plantation but after the end of the war, commodity prices dropped and by 1921 it was difficult to make a profit. He returned again to Britain, in what later biographer Philip Heselton speculated might have been an unsuccessful attempt to ask his father for money. Returning to Malaya, Gardner found that the Borneo Company had sacked him, and he was forced to find work with the Public Works Department. In September 1923 he successfully applied to the Office of Customs to become a government-inspector of rubber plantations, a job that involved a great amount of travelling around the country, something he enjoyed.

After a brief but serious illness, the Johore government reassigned Gardner to an office in the Lands Office while he recovered, eventually being promoted to Principal Officer of Customs. In this capacity, he was made an Inspector of Rubber Shops, overseeing the regulation and sale of rubber in the country. In 1926 he was placed in charge of monitoring shops selling opium, noting regular irregularities and a thriving illegal trade in the controlled substance; believing opium to be essentially harmless, there is evidence indicating that Gardner probably took many bribes in this position, earning himself a small fortune.

=== Marriage and archaeology: 1927–1936 ===
Gardner's mother had died in 1920, but he had not returned to Britain on that occasion. However, in 1927 his father became very ill with dementia, and Gardner decided to visit him. On his return to Britain, Gardner began to investigate spiritualism and mediumship. He soon had several encounters which he attributed to spirits of deceased family members.

Continuing to visit Spiritualist churches and séances, he was highly critical of much of what he saw, although he encountered several mediums he considered genuine. One medium apparently made contact with a deceased cousin of Gardner's, an event which impressed him greatly. His first biographer Jack Bracelin reports that this was a watershed in Gardner's life, and that a previous academic interest in spiritualism and life after death thereafter became a matter of firm personal belief for him.

The very same evening (28 July 1927) after Gardner had met this medium, he met the woman he was to marry; Dorothea Frances Rosedale, known as Donna, a relation of his sister-in-law Edith. He asked her to marry him the next day and she agreed. Because his leave was coming to an end very soon, they married quickly on 16 August at St Jude's Church, Kensington, and then honeymooned in Ryde on the Isle of Wight, before heading via France to Malaya.

Arriving in the country, the couple settled into a bungalow at Bukit Japon in Johor Bahru. Here, he once more became involved in Freemasonry, joining the Johore Royal Lodge No. 3946, but had retired from it by April 1931. Gardner also returned to his old interests in the anthropology of Malaya, witnessing the magical practices performed by the locals, and he readily accepted a belief in magic. During his time in Malaya, Gardner became increasingly interested in local customs, particularly those involved in folk magic and weapons.

Gardner was not only interested in the anthropology of Malaya, but also in its archaeology. He began excavations at the city of Johore Lama, alone and in secret, as the local Sultan considered archaeologists little better than grave-robbers. Prior to Gardner's investigations, no serious archaeological excavation had occurred at the city, though he himself soon unearthed four miles of earthworks, and uncovered finds that included tombs, pottery, and porcelain dating from Ming China.

He went on to begin further excavations at the royal cemetery of Kota Tinggi, and the jungle city of Syong Penang. His finds were displayed as an exhibit on the "Early History of Johore" at the National Museum of Singapore, and several beads that he had discovered suggested that trade went on between the Roman Empire and the Malays, presumably, Gardner thought, via India. He also found gold coins originating from Johore and he published academic papers on both the beads and the coins.

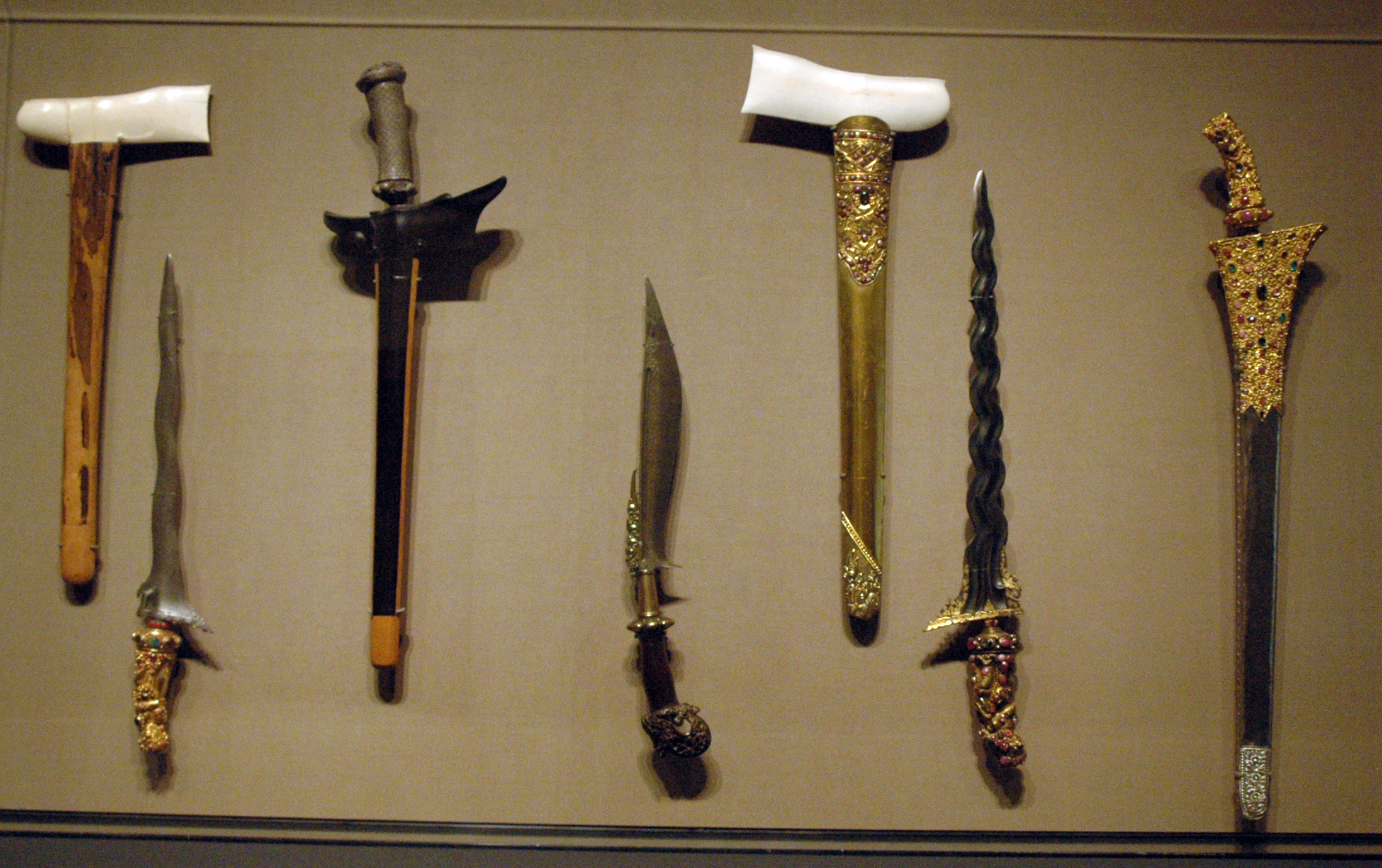
A selection of kris knives; Gardner took a great interest in such items, even authoring the definitive text on the subject, Keris and Other Malay Weapons (1936).

By the early 1930s Gardner's activities had moved from those exclusively of a civil servant, and he began to think of himself more as a folklorist, archaeologist and anthropologist. He was encouraged in this by the director of the Raffles Museum (now the National Museum of Singapore) and by his election to Fellowship of the Royal Anthropological Institute in 1936.

En route back to London in 1932 Gardner stopped off in Egypt and, armed with a letter of introduction, joined Sir Flinders Petrie who was excavating the site of Tall al-Ajjul in Palestine. Arriving in London in August 1932 he attended a conference on prehistory and protohistory at King's College London, attending at least two lectures which described the cult of the Mother Goddess. He also befriended the archaeologist and practising Pagan Alexander Keiller, known for his excavations at Avebury, who would encourage Gardner to join in with the excavations at Hembury Hill in Devon, also attended by Aileen Fox and Mary Leakey.

Returning to East Asia, he took a ship from Singapore to Saigon in French Indo-China, from where he travelled to Phnom Penh, visiting the Silver Pagoda. He then took a train to Hangzhou in China, before continuing onto Shanghai; because of the ongoing Chinese Civil War, the train did not stop throughout the entire journey, something that annoyed the passengers. In 1935, Gardner attended the Second Congress for Prehistoric Research in the Far East in Manila, Philippines, acquainting himself with several experts in the field.

His main research interest lay in the Malay kris blade, which he unusually chose to spell "keris"; he eventually collected 400 examples and talked to natives about their magico-religious uses. Deciding to author a book on the subject, he wrote Keris and Other Malay Weapons, being encouraged to do so by anthropologist friends; it would subsequently be edited into a readable form by Betty Lumsden Milne and published by the Singapore-based Progressive Publishing Company in 1936. It was well received by literary and academic circles in Malaya.

In 1935, Gardner heard that his father had died, leaving him a bequest of £3,000. This assurance of financial independence may have led him to consider retirement, and as he was due for a long leave in 1936 the Johore Civil Service allowed him to retire slightly early, in January 1936. Gardner wanted to stay in Malaya, but he conceded to his wife Donna, who insisted that they return to England.

=== Return to Europe: 1936–1938 ===
In 1936, Gardner and Donna left Malaya and headed for Europe. She proceeded straight to London, renting them a flat at 26 Charing Cross Road. Gardner visited Palestine, becoming involved in the archaeological excavations run by J.L. Starkey at Lachish. Here he grew particularly interested in a temple containing statues to both the male deity Yahweh and the pagan goddess Ashtoreth.

From Palestine, Gardner went to Turkey, Greece, Hungary, and Germany. He eventually reached England, but soon went on a visit to Denmark to attend a conference on weaponry at the Christiansborg Palace, Copenhagen, during which he gave a talk on the kris.

Returning to Britain, he found that the climate made him sick, leading him to register with a doctor, Edward A. Gregg, who recommended that he try nudism. Hesitant at first, Gardner first attended an indoor nudist club, the Lotus League in Finchley, North London, where he made several new friends and felt that the nudity cured his ailment. When summer came, he decided to visit an outdoor nudist club, that of Fouracres near the town of Bricket Wood in Hertfordshire, which he soon began to frequent.

Through nudism, Gardner made a number of notable friends, including James Laver (1899–1975), who became the Keeper of Prints and Drawings at the Victoria and Albert Museum, and Cottie Arthur Burland (1905–1983), who was the Curator of the Department of Ethnography at the British Museum. Biographer Philip Heselton suggested that through the nudist scene Gardner may have also met Dion Byngham (1896–1990), a senior member of the Order of Woodcraft Chivalry who propounded a Contemporary Pagan religion known as Dionysianism. By the end of 1936, Gardner was finding his Charing Cross Road flat to be cramped and moved into the block of flats at 32a Buckingham Palace Mansions.

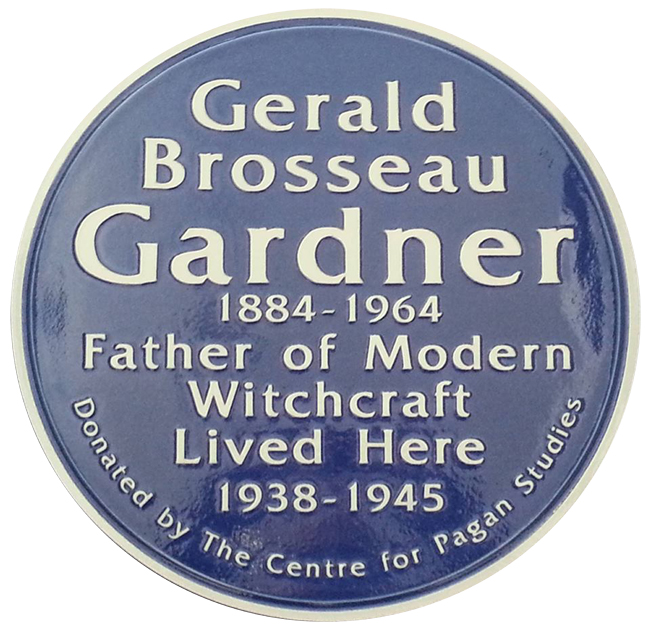
A plaque erected to mark the house at Highcliffe where Gardner lived during the Second World War.

Fearing the cold of the English winter, Gardner decided to sail to Cyprus in late 1936, remaining there into the following year. Visiting the Museum in Nicosia, he studied the Bronze Age swords of the island, successfully hafting one of them, on the basis of which he wrote a paper entitled "The Problem of the Cypriot Bronze Dagger Hilt", which would subsequently be translated into both French and Danish, being published in the journals of the Société Préhistorique Française and the Vaabenhistorisk Selskab respectively.

Back in London, in September 1937, Gardner applied for and received a Doctorate of Philosophy from the Meta Collegiate Extension of the National Electronic Institute, an organisation based in Nevada that was widely recognised by academic institutions as offering invalid academic degrees via post for a fee. He would subsequently style himself as "Dr. Gardner", despite the fact that academic institutions would not recognise his qualifications.

Planning to return to the Palestinian excavations the following winter, he was prevented from doing so when Starkey was murdered. Instead, he decided to return to Cyprus. A believer in reincarnation, Gardner came to believe that he had lived on the island once before, in a previous life, subsequently buying a plot of land in Famagusta, planning to build a house on it, although this never came about.

Influenced by his dreams, he wrote his first novel, A Goddess Arrives, over the next few years. Revolving around an Englishman living in 1930s London named Robert Denvers who has recollections of a previous life as a Bronze Age Cypriot – an allusion to Gardner himself – the primary plot of A Goddess Arrives is set in ancient Cyprus and featured a queen, Dayonis, who practices sorcery in an attempt to help her people defend themselves from invading Egyptians. Published in late 1939, biographer Philip Heselton noted that the book was "a very competent first work of fiction", with strong allusions to the build-up which proceeded World War II.

Returning to London, he helped to dig shelter trenches in Hyde Park as a part of the build-up to the war, also volunteering for the Air Raid Wardens' Service. Fearing the bombing of the city, Gardner and his wife soon moved to Highcliffe, just south of the New Forest in Hampshire. Here, they purchased a house built in 1923 named Southridge, situated on the corner of Highland Avenue and Elphinstone Road.

== Involvement in Wicca ==
=== The Rosicrucian Order: 1938–1939 ===
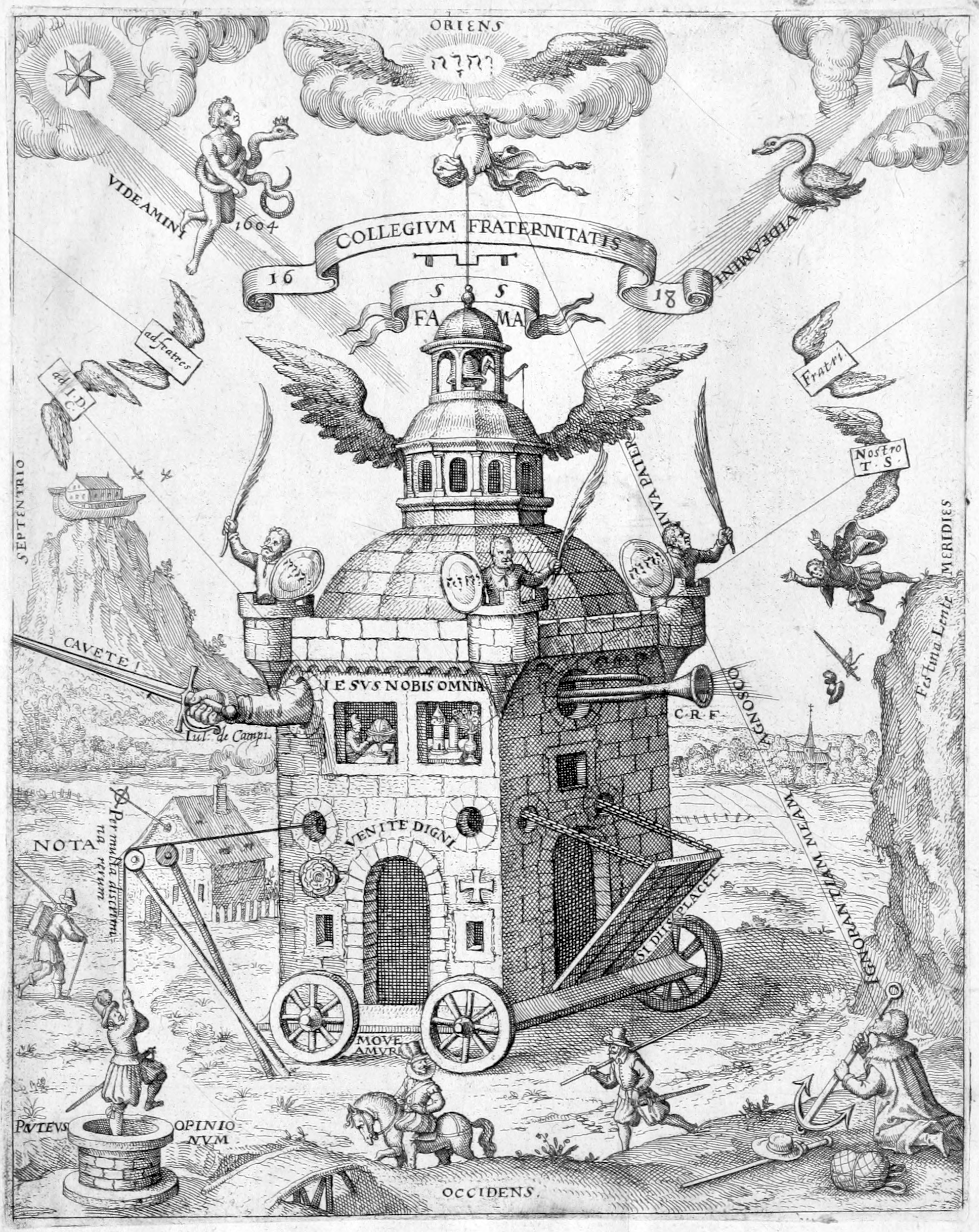
The Temple of the Rose Cross, Teophilus Schweighardt Constantiens, 1618.

In Highcliffe, Gardner came across a building describing itself as the "First Rosicrucian Theatre in England". Having an interest in Rosicrucianism, a prominent magico-religious tradition within Western esotericism, Gardner decided to attend one of the plays performed by the group; in August 1939, Gardner took his wife to a theatrical performance based on the life of Pythagoras. An amateur thespian, she hated the performance, thinking the quality of both actors and script terrible, and she refused to go again.

Unperturbed and hoping to learn more of Rosicrucianism, Gardner joined the group in charge of running the theatre, the Rosicrucian Order Crotona Fellowship, and began attending meetings held in their local ashram. Founded in 1920 by George Alexander Sullivan, the Fellowship had been based upon a blend of Rosicrucianism, Theosophy, Freemasonry and his own personal innovation, and had moved to Christchurch in 1930.

As time went by, Gardner became critical of many of the Rosicrucian Order's practices; Sullivan's followers claimed that he was immortal, having formerly been the famous historical figures Pythagoras, Cornelius Agrippa and Francis Bacon. Gardner facetiously asked if he was also the Wandering Jew, much to the annoyance of Sullivan himself. Another belief held by the group that Gardner found amusing was that a lamp hanging from one of the ceilings was the disguised Holy Grail of Arthurian legend.

Gardner's dissatisfaction with the group grew, particularly when in 1939, one of the group's leaders sent a letter out to all members in which she stated that war would not come. The very next day, Britain declared war on Germany, greatly unimpressing the increasingly cynical Gardner.

Alongside Rosicrucianism, Gardner had also been pursuing other interests. In 1939, Gardner joined the Folk-Lore Society; his first contribution to its journal Folk-Lore, appeared in the June 1939 issue and described a box of witchcraft relics that he believed had belonged to the 17th century "Witch-Finder General", Matthew Hopkins. Subsequently, in 1946 he would go on to become a member of the society's governing council, although most other members of the society were wary of him and his academic credentials.

Gardner would also join the Historical Association, being elected co-president of its Bournemouth and Christchurch branch in June 1944, following which he became a vocal supporter for the construction of a local museum for the Christchurch borough. He also involved himself in preparations for the impending war, joining the Air Raid Precautions (ARP) as a warden, where he soon rose to a position of local seniority, with his own house being assigned as the ARP post. In 1940, following the outbreak of conflict, he also tried to sign up for the Local Defence Volunteers, or "Home Guard", but was turned away because he was already an ARP warden.

He managed to circumvent this restriction by joining his local Home Guard in the capacity as armourer, which was officially classified as technical staff. Gardner took a strong interest in the Home Guard, helping to arm his fellows from his own personal weaponry collection and personally manufacturing molotov cocktails.

=== The New Forest coven: 1939–1944 ===
Although sceptical of the Rosicrucian Order, Gardner got on well with a group of individuals inside the group who were "rather brow-beaten by the others, kept themselves to themselves." Gardner's biographer Philip Heselton theorised that this group consisted of Edith Woodford-Grimes (1887–1975), Susie Mason, her brother Ernie Mason, and their sister Rosetta Fudge, all of whom had originally come from Southampton before moving to the area around Highcliffe, where they joined the Order.

According to Gardner, "unlike many of the others [in the Order], [they] had to earn their livings, were cheerful and optimistic and had a real interest in the occult". Gardner became "really very fond of them", remarking that he "would have gone through hell and high water even then for any of them." In particular he grew close to Woodford-Grimes, being invited over to her home to meet her daughter, and the two helped each other with their writing, Woodford-Grimes probably assisting Gardner edit A Goddess Arrives prior to publication. Gardner would subsequently give her the nickname "Dafo", for which she would become better known.

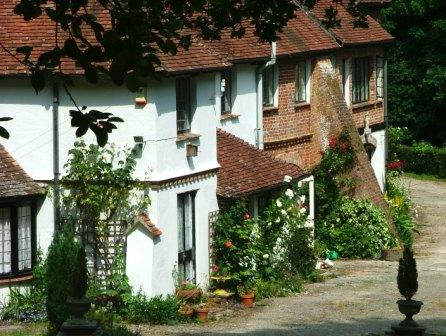
The Mill House in Highcliffe, where Gardner was supposedly initiated into the Craft

According to Gardner's later account, one night in September 1939, they took him to a large house owned by "Old Dorothy" Clutterbuck, a wealthy local woman, where he was made to strip naked and taken through an initiation ceremony. Halfway through the ceremony, he heard the word "Wicca (Male)" and "Wicce (Female)", and he recognised it as an Old English word for "witch".

He was already acquainted with Margaret Murray's theory of the Witch-cult, and that "I then knew then that which I had thought burnt out hundreds of years ago still survived." This group were the New Forest coven, and he portrayed them as one of the few surviving covens of an ancient, pre-Christian Witch-Cult religion. Murray's theory of a pagan 'witch-cult' has been discredited. Later research by the likes of Hutton and Heselton has shown that the New Forest coven was probably only formed in the mid-1930s, based upon Murray's discredited theories and works on folk magic.

Gardner only ever described one of their rituals in depth, and this was an event that he termed "Operation Cone of Power". According to his own account, it took place in 1940 in a part of the New Forest and was designed to ward off the Nazis from invading Britain by magical means. Gardner wrote that a "Great Circle" was erected at night, with a "great cone of power" – a form of magical energy – being raised and sent to Berlin with the command of "you cannot cross the sea, you cannot cross the sea, you cannot come, you cannot come".

=== Bricket Wood and the Origins of Gardnerianism: 1945–1950 ===
Throughout his time in the New Forest, Gardner had regularly travelled to London, keeping his flat at Buckingham Palace Mansions until mid-1939 and regularly visiting the Spielplatz nudist club there. At Spielplatz he befriended Ross Nichols, whom he would later introduce to the Pagan religion of Druidry; Nichols would become enamoured with this faith, eventually founding the Order of Bards, Ovates and Druids. However, following the war, Gardner decided to return to London, moving into 47 Ridgemount Gardens, Bloomsbury in late 1944 or early 1945.

Continuing his interest in nudism, in 1945 he purchased a plot of land in Fouracres, a nudist colony near to the village of Bricket Wood in Hertfordshire that would soon be renamed Five Acres. As a result, he would become one of the major shareholders at the club, exercising a significant level of power over any administrative decisions and was involved in a recruitment drive to obtain more members.

The Witches' Cottage, where Gardner and his Bricket Wood coven performed their rituals

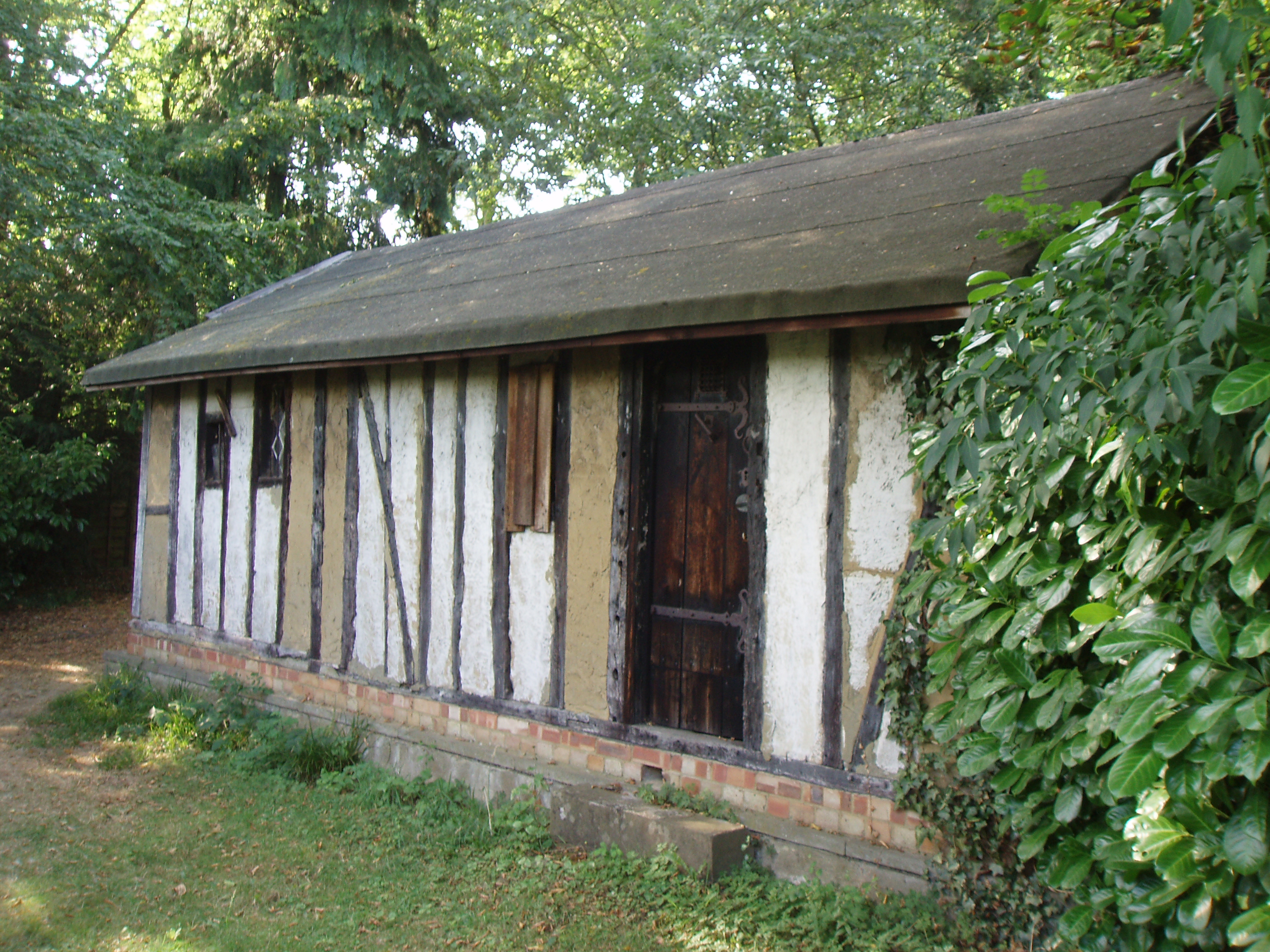
The Witches' Cottage in 2006

Between 1936 and 1939, Gardner befriended the Christian mystic J.S.M. Ward, proprietor of the Abbey Folk Park, Britain's oldest open-air museum. One of the exhibits was a 16th-century cottage that Ward had found near to Ledbury, Herefordshire and had transported to his park, where he exhibited it as a "witch's cottage". Gardner made a deal with Ward exchanging the cottage for Gardner's piece of land near to Famagusta in Cyprus.

The cottage was dismantled, and the parts transported to Bricket Wood, where they were reassembled on Gardner's land at Five Acres. In Midsummer 1947 he held a ceremony in the cottage as a form of housewarming, which Heselton speculated was probably based upon the ceremonial magic rites featured in The Key of Solomon grimoire.

Furthering his interest in esoteric Christianity, in August 1946 Gardner was ordained as a priest in the Ancient British Church, a fellowship open to anyone who considered themselves a monotheist. Gardner also took an interest in Druidry, joining the Ancient Druid Order (ADO) and attending its annual Midsummer rituals at Stonehenge.

He also joined the Folk-Lore Society, being elected to their council in 1946, and that same year giving a talk on "Art Magic and Talismans". Nevertheless, many fellows – including Katherine Briggs – were dismissive of Gardner's ideas and his fraudulent academic credentials. In 1946 he also joined the Society for Psychical Research.

On May Day 1947, Gardner's friend Arnold Crowther introduced him to Aleister Crowley, the ceremonial magician who had founded the religion of Thelema in 1904. Shortly before his death, Crowley elevated Gardner to the IV° of Ordo Templi Orientis (O.T.O.) and issued a charter decreeing that Gardner could admit people into its Minerval degree. The charter itself was written in Gardner's handwriting and only signed by Crowley.

From November 1947 to March 1948, Gardner and his wife toured the United States visiting relatives in Memphis, also visiting New Orleans, where Gardner hoped to learn about Voodoo. During his voyage, Crowley had died, and as a result Gardner considered himself the head of the O.T.O. in Europe, (a position accepted by Lady Frieda Harris). He met Crowley's successor, Karl Germer, in New York though Gardner would soon lose interest in leading the O.T.O., and in 1951 he was replaced by Frederic Mellinger as the O.T.O.'s European representative.

Gardner hoped to spread Wicca and described some of its practices in a fictional form as High Magic's Aid. Set in the twelfth-century, Gardner included scenes of ceremonial magic based on The Key of Solomon. Published by the Atlantis Bookshop in July 1949, Gardner's manuscript had been edited into a publishable form by astrologer Madeline Montalban.

Privately, he had also begun work on a scrapbook known as "Ye Bok of Ye Art Magical", in which he wrote down a number of Wiccan rituals and spells. This would prove to be the prototype for what he later termed a Book of Shadows. He also gained some of his first initiates, Barbara and Gilbert Vickers, who were initiated at some point between autumn 1949 and autumn 1950.

=== Doreen Valiente and the Museum of Magic and Witchcraft: 1950–1957 ===
Gardner also came into contact with Cecil Williamson, who was intent on opening his own museum devoted to witchcraft; the result would be the Folk-lore Centre of Superstition and Witchcraft, opened in Castletown on the Isle of Man in 1951. Gardner and his wife moved to the island, where he took up the position of "resident witch". On 29 July, the Sunday Pictorial published an article about the museum in which Gardner declared "Of course I'm a witch. And I get great fun out of it."

The museum was not a financial success, and the relationship between Gardner and Williamson deteriorated. In 1954, Gardner bought the museum from Williamson, who returned to England to form the rival Museum of Witchcraft, eventually settling it in Boscastle, Cornwall. Gardner renamed his exhibition the Museum of Magic and Witchcraft and continued running it up until his death.

He also acquired a flat at 145 Holland Road, near Shepherd's Bush in West London, but nevertheless fled to warmer climates during the winter, where his asthma would not be so badly affected, for instance spending time in France, Italy, and the Gold Coast. From his base in London, he would frequent Atlantis bookshop, thereby encountering a number of other occultists, including Austin Osman Spare and Kenneth Grant, and he also continued his communication with Karl Germer until 1956.

In 1952, Gardner had begun to correspond with a young woman named Doreen Valiente. She eventually requested initiation into the Craft, and though Gardner was hesitant at first, he agreed that they could meet during the winter at the home of Edith Woodford-Grimes. Valiente got on well with both Gardner and Woodford-Grimes and having no objections to either ritual nudity or scourging (which she had read about in a copy of Gardner's novel High Magic's Aid that he had given to her), she was initiated by Gardner into Wicca on Midsummer 1953.

Valiente went on to join the Bricket Wood Coven. She soon rose to become the High Priestess of the coven and helped Gardner to revise his Book of Shadows, and attempting to cut out most of Crowley's influence.

In 1954, Gardner published a non-fiction book, Witchcraft Today, containing a preface by Margaret Murray, who had published her discredited theory of 'witchcraft' being a surviving pagan religion in her 1921 book, The Witch-Cult in Western Europe. In his book, Gardner not only espoused Murray's theory, but also his theory that a belief in faeries in Europe was due to a secretive pygmy race that lived alongside other communities, and that the Knights Templar had been initiates of the Craft.

Alongside this book, Gardner began to increasingly court publicity, going so far as to invite the press to write articles about the religion. Many of these turned out very negatively for the cult; one declared "Witches Devil-Worship in London!", and another accused him of whitewashing witchcraft in his luring of people into covens. Gardner continued courting publicity, despite the negative articles that many tabloids were producing, and believed that only through publicity could more people become interested in witchcraft, so preventing the "Old Religion", as he called it, from dying out.

=== Later life and death ===
In 1960, Gardner's official biography, entitled Gerald Gardner: Witch, was published. It was written by a friend of his, the Sufi mystic Idries Shah, but used the name of one of Gardner's High Priests, Jack L. Bracelin, because Shah was wary about being associated with Witchcraft. In May of that year, Gardner travelled to Buckingham Palace, where he enjoyed a garden party in recognition of his years of service to the Empire in the Far East. Soon after his trip, Gardner's wife Donna died, and Gardner himself once again began to suffer badly from asthma.

The following year he, along with Shah and Lois Bourne, travelled to the island of Mallorca to holiday with the poet Robert Graves, whose The White Goddess would play a significant part in the burgeoning Wiccan religion. In 1963, Gardner decided to go to Lebanon over the winter. Whilst returning home on the Scottish Prince on 12 February 1964, he suffered a fatal heart attack at the breakfast table. He was buried in Tunisia, the ship's next port of call, and his funeral was attended only by the ship's captain. He was 79 years old.

Though having bequeathed the museum, all his artifacts, and the copyright to his books in his will to one of his High Priestesses, Monique Wilson, she and her husband sold off the artefact collection to the American Ripley's Believe It or Not! organisation several years later. Ripley's took the collection to America, where it was displayed in two museums before being sold off during the 1980s. Gardner had also left parts of his inheritance to Patricia Crowther, Doreen Valiente, Lois Bourne and Jack Bracelin, the latter inheriting the Fiveacres Nudist Club and taking over as full-time High Priest of the Bricket Wood coven.

Several years after Gardner's death, the Wiccan High Priestess Eleanor Bone visited North Africa and went looking for Gardner's grave. She discovered that the cemetery he was interred in was to be redeveloped, and so she raised enough money for his body to be moved to another cemetery in Tunis, where it currently remains. In 2007, a new plaque was attached to his grave, describing him as being "Father of Modern Wicca. Beloved of the Great Goddess".

== Personal life ==
Gardner only married once, to Donna, and several who knew him have said that he was devoted to her. Indeed, after her death in 1960, he began to again suffer serious asthma attacks. Despite this, as many coven members slept over at his cottage due to living too far away to travel home safely, he was known to cuddle up to his young High Priestess, Dayonis, after rituals. The author Philip Heselton, who largely researched Wicca's origins, came to the conclusion that Gardner had held a long-term affair with Dafo, a theory expanded upon by Adrian Bott.

Those who knew him within the Wiccan movement recalled how he was a firm believer in the therapeutic benefits of sunbathing. He also had several tattoos on his body, depicting magical symbols such as a snake, dragon, anchor and dagger. In his later life he wore a "heavy bronze bracelet... denoting the three degrees... of witchcraft" as well as a "large silver ring with... signs on it, which... represented his witch-name 'Scire', in the letters of the magical Theban alphabet."

According to Bricket Wood coven member Frederic Lamond, Gardner also used to comb his beard into a narrow barbiche and his hair into two horn like peaks, giving him "a somewhat demonic appearance". Lamond thought that Gardner was "surprisingly lacking in charisma" for someone at the forefront of a religious movement.

Gardner was a supporter of the centre-right Conservative Party, and for several years had been a member of the Highcliffe Conservative Association, as well as being an avid reader of the pro-Conservative newspaper, The Daily Telegraph.

== Criticisms ==
=== Virulent homophobia ===
Lois Bourne, one of the High Priestesses of the Bricket Wood Coven, accused Gardner of homophobia:

Gerald was homophobic. He had a deep hatred and detestation of homosexuality, which he regarded as a disgusting perversion and a flagrant transgression of natural law ... "There are no homosexual witches, and it is not possible to be a homosexual and a witch" Gerald almost shouted. No one argued with him.

=== Misogyny ===
Gardner has weathered many accusations of misogyny as a result of his choice of rituals. Women are heavily sexualized, often naked, and their genitals included heavily within his worship. His work, The Gardnerian Book of Shadows, includes the following controversial lines:

"As a man loveth a woman, by mastering her, so the Wicca should love the Gods, by being mastered by them."

"A woman may impersonate either the God or the Goddess, but a man may only impersonate the God."

"And the greatest virtue of a High Priestess is that she recognizes that youth is necessary to the representative of the Goddess, so that she will retire gracefully in favour of a younger woman, Should the Coven so decide in Council, For the true [30] High Priestess realizes that gracefully surrendering pride of place is one of the greatest of virtues, and that thereby she will return to that pride of place in another life, with greater power and beauty."

In Witchcraft Today, published in 1954, he states, "The witches tell me: 'The law always has been that power must be passed from man to woman or from woman to man, the only exception being when a mother initiates her daughter or a father his son, because they are part of themselves.' (The reason is that great love is apt to occur between people who go through the rites together.) They go on to say: The Templars broke this age-old rule and passed the power from man to man: this led to sin and in so doing it brought about their downfall.'" While Gardner theorizes this may be a cover for the true reason behind the fall of the Order, he mirrors these ideas further in his writings.

=== False educational claims ===
In a 1951 interview with a journalist from the Sunday Pictorial newspaper, Gardner said he was a Doctor of Philosophy from Singapore and also had a doctorate in literature from Toulouse. Later investigation by Doreen Valiente suggested that these claims were false. The University of Singapore did not exist at that time and the University of Toulouse had no record of his receiving a doctorate. Valiente suggests that these claims may have been a form of compensation for his lack of formal education.

=== Media engagement ===
Valiente further criticises Gardner for his publicity-seeking, or at least his indiscretion. After a series of tabloid exposés, some members of his coven proposed some rules limiting what members of the Craft should say to non-members. Valiente reports that Gardner responded with a set of Wiccan laws of his own, which he claimed were original, but others suspected he had made up on the spot. This led to a split in the coven, with Valiente and others leaving.

== Legacy ==
Commenting on Gardner, Pagan studies scholar Ethan Doyle White commented that "There are few figures in esoteric history who can rival him for his dominating place in the pantheon of Pagan pioneers."

In 2012, Philip Heselton published a two-volume biography of Gardner, titled Witchfather. The biography was reviewed by Pagan studies scholar Ethan Doyle White in The Pomegranate journal, where he commented that it was "more exhaustive with greater detail" than Heselton's prior tomes and was "excellent in most respects".

== Bibliography ==
- Gardner, Gerald (1933). "Notes on some Ancient Gold Coins, from the Johore River". Journal of the Malayan Branch of the Royal Asiatic Society. XI (II): 171–176.
- ——— (1936). Keris and other Malay Weapons. Singapore: Progressive.
- ——— (1937). "Ancient Beads from the Johore River as Evidence of an Early Link by Sea between Malaya and the Roman Empire". Journal of the Royal Asiatic Society. 69 (3): 467–470. doi:10.1017/S0035869X00085993. S2CID 162991919.
- ——— (1939). A Goddess Arrives (fiction). London: Arthur H. Stockwell.
- ——— (2010) [1949]. High Magic's Aid (fiction). Aurinia. ISBN 978-0-9566182-0-7.
- ——— (1954). Witchcraft Today. London: Rider.
- ——— (1957). The Story of the famous Witches Mill at Castletown, Isle of Man (guidebook). Tunbridge Wells.
- ——— (1959). The Meaning of Witchcraft. London: Aquarian.

== See also ==
- Ashrama Hall and Christchurch Garden Theatre

== Sources ==
- Bourne, Lois (1998). Dancing with Witches. London: Robert Hale. ISBN 978-0-7090-6223-3.
- Bracelin, Jack (1960). Gerald Gardner: Witch. Octagon.
- Doyle White, Ethan (2012). "Philip Heselton, Witchfather: A Life of Gerald Gardner: Volume One—Into the Witch Cult and Witchfather: A Life of Gerald Gardner: Volume Two—From Witch Cult to Wicca (Loughborough, Leicestershire: Thoth Publications, 2012), 686 pp., £16.95 (Vol.1) £18.95". [Review]. Pomegranate: The International Journal of Pagan Studies. 14 (1): 171–174. doi:10.1558/pome.v14i1.171.
- Gardner, Gerald (1933). "Notes on some Ancient Gold Coins, from the Johore River". Journal of the Malayan Branch of the Royal Asiatic Society. XI (II): 171–176.
- Gardner, Gerald (1936). Keris and other Malay Weapons. Singapore: Progressive.
- Gardner, Gerald (1937). "Ancient Beads from the Johore River as Evidence of an Early Link by Sea between Malaya and the Roman Empire". Journal of the Royal Asiatic Society. 69 (3): 467–470. doi:10.1017/S0035869X00085993. S2CID 162991919.
- Heselton, Philip (2003). Gerald Gardner and the Cauldron of Inspiration: An Investigation Into the Sources of Gardnerian Witchcraft. Capall Bann. ISBN 978-1-86163-164-0.
- Heselton, Philip (2012a). Witchfather: A Life of Gerald Gardner. Vol. 1: Into the Witch Cult. Loughborough, Leicestershire: Thoth. ISBN 978-1-870450-80-5.
- Heselton, Philip (2012b). Witchfather: A Life of Gerald Gardner. Vol. 2: From Witch Cult to Wicca. Loughborough, Leicestershire: Thoth. ISBN 978-1-870450-79-9.
- Lamond, Frederic (2004). Fifty Years of Wicca. Sutton Mallet: Green Magic. ISBN 978-0-9547230-1-9.
- Valiente, Doreen (2007) [1989]. The Rebirth of Witchcraft. London: Robert Hale. ISBN 978-0-7090-8369-6.
