= Monique Wilson (Wiccan) =

Wiccan priestess

- Born: Monique Marie Mauricette Arnoux; 1923 (or possibly 1928); Haiphong, Vietnam
- Died: 1982; Spain
- Occupation: Witch
- Spouse: Campbell "Scotty" Wilson

Monique Marie Mauricette Wilson (née Arnoux) also known as Lady Olwen was a prominent Witch and member of Wicca founder Gerald Gardner's inner circle.

== Early life ==
Wilson was born Monique Marie Mauricette Arnoux in Haiphong, Vietnam in 1923 (or possibly 1928) to French parents. Her father was an officer in the French navy. As a child, she met Wicca founder Gerald Gardner while he was working as a British customs official. The two became close, with Wilson referring to him throughout her life as "Uncle Gerald". In 1939, Wilson's father was killed, and she and her mother fled with other refugees to Hong Kong. There, Wilson would meet her husband, Campbell "Scotty" Wilson, a bomber pilot for the RAF.

== Involvement with Wicca ==
She became known as Britain's "new "Queen of the Witches." In the 1960s, the Wilsons (now living as pea farmers in Scotland) developed an interest in Wicca. Monique Wilson wrote to her old friend "Uncle Gerald", asking for guidance in establishing a Wiccan presence in Scotland. Gardner referred them to his friend Charles Clark, who initiated the Wilsons and their young daughter into Wicca and gave Wilson the craft name "Lady Olwen". By 1961, the Wilsons had founded their own coven in Perth. She became a high priestess of covens in Scotland. Shortly before his death in 1964, Gerald Gardner named Monique Wilson his heir, bestowing most of his estate and the entire contents of his Museum of Witchcraft and Magic upon her. She and her husband placed the collection on public exhibition at the 17th century "Witches' Mill" on the Isle of Man near the village of Castletown. In 1973, Wilson sold the Museum and its contents (10,000 items) to Ripley's Believe It or Not!, facing much criticism from the Wiccan community for her perceived betrayal.

== Later life ==
After the backlash from her sale of Gardner's collection, Wilson distanced herself from the Wiccan community. She died in 1982, followed by her husband in the 1990s. Their daughter, Yvette, renounced her association with Witchcraft and the Wicca beliefs and actively avoids discussing her mother's life.
