= Rosicrucian Order Crotona Fellowship =

Rosicrucian group founded by George Alexander Sullivan

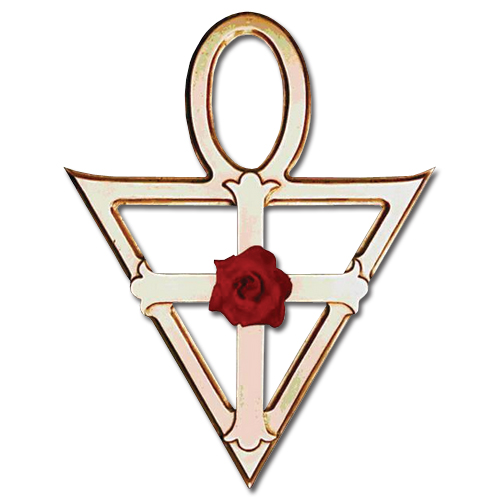
Official insignia of the Rosicrucian Order

The Rosicrucian Order Crotona Fellowship was a Rosicrucian group founded by George Alexander Sullivan in about 1924. It may have existed under the name The Order of Twelve from 1911 to 1914 and again from 1920. The ROCF operated first from the Liverpool area of England and then after the mid-1930s from the Christchurch area. Its members studied esoteric subjects from lectures, plays and correspondence material prepared by George Alexander Sullivan.

In 1930, a group of members of the order local to the Christchurch area began to meet regularly at a pub in Christchurch, and at about the same time the annual 'conclave' was held in nearby Bournemouth. Some time later the group decided that a more permanent venue was required.

The group's headquarters near Christchurch was a wooden building named the Ashrama Hall, completed in 1936 in the garden of a house owned by Catherine Emily Chalk, who probably also started the original meetings in the pub. In 1938, on the same land, the group built the Christchurch Garden Theatre, which called itself 'The First Rosicrucian Theatre in England'. From June–September 1938 it presented mystically themed plays, written by Sullivan under his journalistic pen-name Alex Matthews.

Sabina Magliocco, in her examination of the influences of the study of folklore on the development of Wicca, considers it possible that by the late 1930s some members of the Crotona Fellowship were performing Wicca-like rituals based on Co-Masonry, and that this was the group referred to by Gerald Gardner as the 'New Forest Coven'.

The numbers attending Rosicrucian Order Crotona Fellowship events always were small, and the group is best known today for its association with Gerald Gardner and Peter Caddy. Following the death of George Alexander Sullivan in 1942, the group's activities and membership diminished. By the early 1950s their focus had moved to Southampton. Correspondence between former members suggests the Order 'existed in memory only' by the early 1970s. The Order's library was deposited at the University of Southampton in 1977.

A significant minority among students of Alice Bailey's Arcane School were members of the Crotona Fellowship.
