= Modern paganism and LGBTQ people =

LGBTQ topics and issues within modern pagan spiritual and religious movements

Queer Pagan flag combining a pentacle and LGBTQ+ rainbow.

The intersections of LGBTQ people with modern paganism vary considerably among different paths, sects, and belief systems.

== Community demographics and LGBTQ prevalence ==
=== Orientation ===
In her 1995 book Never Again The Burning Times, Loretta Orion published results of a survey of the Modern pagan community she conducted in the mid-1980s (Note: The survey beginning and end times are vague in the book, giving loose bounds between 1983 and 1985.) which received 189 responses. Orion found 61% reported as heterosexual, 11% reported as homosexual, and 28% as bisexual.

From 1993 through 1995, Helen A. Berger and Andras Corban Arthen, founder of Neo-Pagan group EarthSpirit Community, surveyed just over two thousand Neo-Pagans in the United States as part of their "Pagan Census". Berger and her colleagues found overall 67.8% reported as heterosexual, 9.3% homosexual (4.8% lesbian, 4.5% gay male), and 19% as bisexual. Orientation demographics differed within subgroups.

1993–1995 Orientation Breakdown by Neo-Pagan Subgroups (Berger, et al.)
Grouping	Heterosexual	Homosexual	Bisexual
Total Sample	67.8%	9.3% (4.8% lesbian / 4.5% gay male)	19.0%
Goddess-identified	63.4%	10.3% (7.1% lesbian / 3.2% gay male)	22.2%
Pagan-identified	66.3%	8.7% (4.6% lesbian / 4.1% gay male)	21.2%
Wiccan-identified	68.0%	9.8% (5.3% lesbian / 4.5% gay male)	18.9%
Druid-identified	73.6%	4.5% (1.5% lesbian / 3.0% gay male)	16.2%

Over a decade later, Helen A. Berger and colleague James R. Lewis, began the "Pagan Census Revisited" which ran from 5 September 2009 until 15 October 2010, and published separate analyses. Lewis reported total responses exceeded eight thousand, with Berger reporting 6420 of those from the United States. Berger states in her 2012 analysis that "there remains a healthy minority that is queer", while the majority of Neo-Pagans, 66.1%, reported as heterosexual. In a follow-up analysis published 2014, James R. Lewis and his colleague Inga Bårdsen Tøllefsen further analyzed responses to the "Pagan Census Revisited" along with census data from England, Wales, Canada, Australia, and New Zealand between 1991 and 2011. (Note: Census years varied due to national differences in census wording and frequency. English and Welsh data was from 2001 and 2011. Canadian data was from 1991, 2001, and 2011. Australian data was from 1991, 2001, 2006, and 2011. New Zealand data was from 2001 alone.) Lewis and Tøllefsen reported orientation prevalence differences between genders..

2009–2010 Orientation Breakdown by Gender (Lewis/Berger/Tøllefsen)
Demographic	Heterosexual	Homosexual	Bisexual	Other
Total Sample	66.9%	7.6% (2.7% lesbian / 4.9% gay)	22.1%	3.2%
Women	66.7%	3.7% (Note: Includes 4 women who identified as "gay" in lieu of "lesbian".)	26.1%	3.4%
Men	69.2%	17.0% (Note: Includes 3 men who identified as "lesbian" and not "gay".)	11.4%	2.2%

A 2015 study survey by Pew Research Center found that 11% of lesbian, gay, and bisexual respondents identified with non-Christian faiths, a large portion of which being some form of neopaganism or interfaith universalist beliefs. This was nearly double LGBTQ prevalence in the general population.

=== Sex / Gender ===
In her 1995 book Never Again The Burning Times, Loretta Orion published results of a survey of the Modern pagan community she conducted in the mid-1980s. The self-reported gender of the 189 respondents was 58% women, 38% men, and 4% androgynous, with Orion surmising those who reported as androgynous "intended to express their rejection of traditional sex roles, rather than biological androgyny" in the endnotes.

While the Western neopagan community is gender-diverse as a whole, the demographics tend toward female plurality or dominance in terms of numbers. The aforementioned 2013 scientific survey of Western neopagans found that women were not only the dominant neopagan demographic, but the proportion thereof was increasing across the board in many countries surveyed. However, men tended to dominate certain traditions like Norse Heathenry, Druidry, Neo-Shamanism, Ceremonial magic, and Thelema.

== General philosophical and theological analysis and critique ==
=== Gender dualism, essentialism, and sexual orientation ===
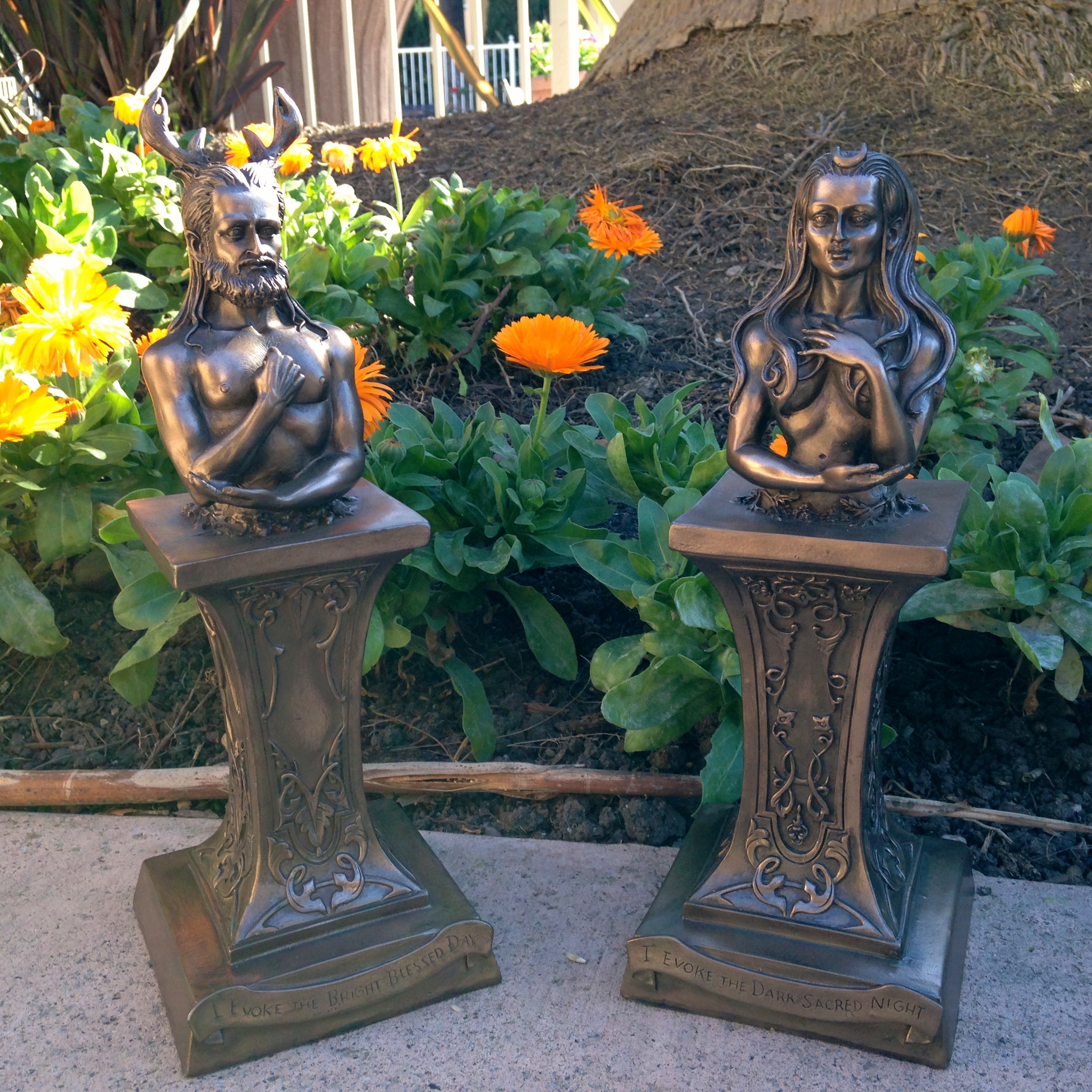
The Triple Goddess (Crone aspect) and Horned God, a common neopagan duotheistic pairing used in Wicca.

Ideological issues that affect LGBTQ perception and interaction within the modern pagan community often stem from a traditionally dualistic cosmology, a view which focuses on two overarching and often oppositional categories. In modern paganism, this is traditionally seen surrounding sexuality, particularly heterosexuality, based on a gender binary which is assigned via genitalia at birth (in other words, gender essentialism).

Binary gender essentialism is highly present in neopagan communities and their respective theological/philosophical belief systems. Pagan sources themselves, such as the Pagan Federation of the U.K., express similar views. The basis of the difference is commonly reflected in discussion about spiritual energy, which is traditionally believed to be intrinsically masculine or feminine in type and inherently possessed by those born into either binary gender.

A preeminent example of this belief is the duotheistic veneration of a God-Goddess pairing, often the Triple Goddess and Horned God, a pairing used by Wiccans. The Goddess (representing the feminine) is traditionally seen as receptive, fertile, nurturing, and passive (cast as the Moon), while the God (representing the masculine) as impregnative, a hunter, and active/aggressive (cast as the Sun). Janet Farrar, a notable Wiccan priestess and author, described this as an adoption of yin and yang in Western pagan practice.

This dual-gender archetype is traditionally regarded in a heterosexual manner, a belief which is reflected in the theology of many neopagan belief systems as well as practices such as magic and spellcraft, which traditional sects require heterosexual-based dynamics to perform. This can be a struggle for LGBTQ pagans who find the exemplified duality not reflective of their own feelings and desires.

The liturgy of the deity pair is often associated in essentialist ways. The Triple Goddess, in her three aspects Maiden, Mother, and Crone, is associated with the reproductive development and cessation of a fertile cisgender woman. Beginning life, the Maiden (young woman) represents virginal preadolescence. Upon menarche, the woman comes of age and transforms into the Mother (adult woman) aspect, now ostensibly capable of reproduction. Upon menopause, the woman loses her reproductive capacity she once carried, transforming into the Crone (mature woman) aspect. The Moon is believed to represent the menstrual cycle and many pagans believe the two are linked. Likewise, The Horned God is associated with the reproductive capability of cisgender men. Phallic symbology, such as the eponymous horns, represent the penis and the associated reproductive function.

=== Recent historical views on sexuality and gender ===
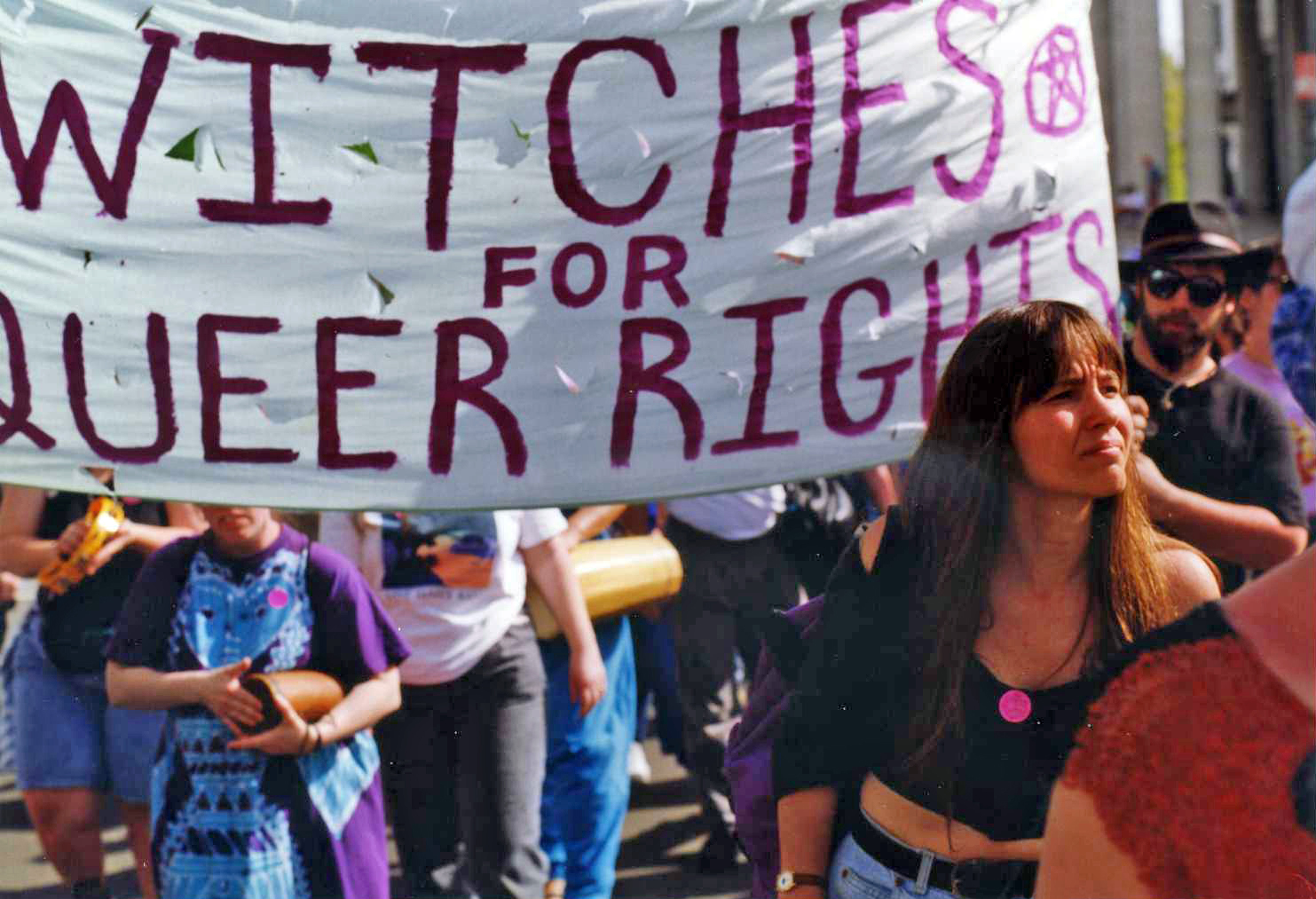
"Witches for Queer Rights" participating in the 1993 March on Washington for Lesbian, Gay and Bi Equal Rights and Liberation

In the mid-20th century dawn of Neopaganism, heterosexual dualism was most exemplified in the "Great Rite" of British Traditional Wicca, one of the first notable neopagan ideological groups. In this Rite, a priest and priestess "were cast into rigidly gendered, heteronormative roles" in which the pairing performed a symbolic or literal representation of heterosexual intercourse which was considered vital for venerating supernatural entities and performing magic. It is notable that early neopagan views on sex were radical for their time in their sex positivity and tacit acceptance of BDSM.

Later in the 20th Century, as Wicca spread to North America, it incorporated countercultural, second-wave feminist, and LGBTQ elements. The essentialist rigidity fluctuated under the influence of Carl Jung's notions of anima and animus and non-heterosexual orientations became more acceptable. By the 1980s and 1990s, figures like Vivianne Crowley and Starhawk continued the evolving beliefs. Crowley associated the Jungian binary with classical elements possessed by all—the feminine/anima with water and the masculine/animus with fire. Starhawk, espousing views similar to Crowley in her 1979 edition of her seminal book The Spiral Dance, began calling into question the masculine-feminine divisions entirely by the 1999 edition, and instead focusing on traits instead of gender archetypes.

At the dawn of the 21st century, queer neopagans and their sects began to assert themselves more publicly. These LGBTQ-aligned groups "challenged the gender essentialism remaining in the sexual polarity still practiced" which remained in certain Wicca and feminist neopagan enclaves. Greater exploration and acceptance of queer and transgender figures began not only for adherents but deities and mythological figures as well. In addition, sex positivity and BDSM were brought back into active exploration and acceptance.

== LGBTQ concerns in specific sects, paths, and traditions ==
=== Wicca ===
Most Wiccans worship the Triple Goddess and Horned God. Prof. Melissa Harrington, writing about sexuality and Wicca, noted the Goddess and God themselves, along with the Wheel of the Year that venerates them, are a "predominantly heterosexual model", also specifying that sexual activity is typically sacramental to Wiccans.

Furthermore, a central part of Wiccan liturgy involves the Great Rite, an act of actual or symbolic ritual sexual intercourse between the two deities. This is traditionally carried out by a priest and priestess who have had the deities invoked upon them, and the conventional practice appears to be exclusively heterosexual. When performed 'in token' this involves the athame (representing the penis) descending into the chalice (representing the vagina).

Gardnerian and Alexandrian groups typically form their covens from male-female pairs exclusively. Kraemer writes, "The British Traditional Wicca of the 1950s and 1960s saw masculine and feminine energies as wholly distinct from each other, yet complementary. Although masculinity and femininity were to be valued equally, priestesses and priests were cast into rigidly gendered, heteronormative roles."

==== Gardnerian ====
Gerald Gardner, the eponymous founder of Gardnerian Wicca, particularly stressed heterosexual approaches to Wicca. This practice may stem from Gardner's text (ostensibly quoting a witch, but perhaps in his own words):

"The witches tell me 'The law always has been that power must be passed from man to woman or from woman to man, the only exception being when a mother initiates her daughter or a father his son, because they are part of themselves' (the reason is that great love is apt to occur between people who go through the rites together.) They go on to say: 'The Templars broke this age-old rule and passed the power from man to man: this led to sin and in doing so it brought about their downfall.' ... For this reason, they say, the goddess has strictly forbidden a man to be initiated by or to work with a man, or a woman to be initiated by or to work with a woman, the only exceptions being that a father may initiate his son and a mother her daughter, as said above; and the curse of the goddess may be on any who break this law."

— Gerald Gardner, Witchcraft Today (1954)

Gardner was accused of homophobia by Lois Bourne, one of the High Priestesses of the Bricket Wood coven:

"Gerald was homophobic. He had a deep hatred and detestation of homosexuality, which he regarded as a disgusting perversion and a flagrant transgression of natural law... 'There are no homosexual witches, and it is not possible to be a homosexual and a witch' Gerald almost shouted. No one argued with him."

— Lois Bourne, Dancing With Witches (2006)

However, the legitimacy of Gardner's rumored homophobia isn't definitive. Gardner showed evidence of an open and accepting attitude about practices in his writing which would not be characterized by the hatred or phobia which was common in the 1950s:

"Also, though the witch ideal is to form perfect couples of people ideally suited to each other, nowadays this is not always possible; the right couples go together and the rest go singly and do as they can. Witchcraft today is largely a case of 'make do'."

==== Alexandrian ====
Alex Sanders, the co-founder of Gardnerian offshoot Alexandrian Wicca, came out as bisexual later in life and created new rituals in which sexual orientation was irrelevant. However, a significant portion of Alexandrian belief is regarding heterosexual reproduction, best expressed by his wife and co-founder Maxine Sanders who is well known to emphasize the concept of male-female polarity and the fact that Alexandrian Wicca is a fertility religion. She also expressed concern about a proper functionality of transgender people (referred to as "transvestites") within coven practices, saying it best to look at other traditions that suit them more. "These people", as she is noted to have said, "they're not happy people."

==== Feminist/Goddess Wicca ====
The symbol of Dianic Wicca – a circumscribed pentacle combined with the Triple Goddess symbol.

In the 1970s, second-wave feminism and modern paganism surged forth simultaneously. Wicca paths which spawned in this time period are most notably the Reclaiming and Dianic traditions. Zsuzsanna Budapest, creator of Dianic Wicca, founded the path as a female-only, Goddess veneration tradition, while modern derivative sects may not exclude based on gender. During this time, heterosexual and lesbian feminists got into conflicts as well.

Incompatibilities between Z Budapest Dianic tradition and transgender pagans most notably reverberated across the US pagan community following the PantheaCon 2011 incident, of which there are accounts which vary depending on ideological and theological faction, in which two Dianic covens held rituals (a misogyny-healing ritual focusing on Lilith led by the Amazon Priestess Tribe and a skyclad ritual for sexual assault victims to heal from their trauma hosted by the Come-As-You-Are (CAYA) Coven) in which trans women were allegedly excluded, removed, or ostracized.

Following the incident, Budapest and other notable Dianics spoke out in support of trans exclusion; Budapest notably said "you have to have sometimes [sic] in your life a womb, and overies [sic] and [menstruate] (Note: Budapest's original wording here is "moon bleed") and not die" regarding women, while overall, Dianic practitioners defended trans exclusion while LGBTQ individuals and their allies said exclusion was transphobic, a form of exclusionary feminism. In 2012, the year after the event, the Amazon Priestess Tribe "retired" itself from specifically Z Budapest Dianic tradition, the CAYA Coven began hosting inclusive rituals and began ordaining Priests (men) and Priestxs (non-binary), and PantheaCon itself began mandating concurrent inclusive rituals for any exclusive ones.

Maintaining her position, Budapest has since fallen from grace for much of the US pagan community, and modern trans-accepting Dianics (not following Budapest's traditional liturgy) struggle to escape the shadow of the tradition's founder. Dianics as a whole are often now viewed as trans exclusionary radical feminists where they used to be considered progressive.

=== Heathenry ===
Heathenry, neopaganism drawing from historical Scandinavian (Norse) and Germanic pagan beliefs, typically is more ideologically conservative than most neopagan traditions when it comes to gender roles. Certain heathen organizations, such as The Troth and Declaration 127, have specifically denounced many of these views. A 2015 survey revealed a greater number of heathens subscribed to universalist ideas than ethnicity-based ones.

==== Norse-specific ====
The practice of seiðr, a Norse type of shamanic sorcery, is traditionally regarded as a women-only magical practice, requiring an openness that draws parallels to the sexually receptive feminine role found in other neopagan beliefs. Non-female practitioners are sometimes targeted with homophobic or effeminate harassment, specifically an accusation of ergi, a weak or emasculate state A notable non-female example of seiðr can be found in the Icelandic sagas, by the patriarch-god Odin. In the Ynglinga saga (c.1225), written by Icelandic poet Snorri Sturluson, it is stated that seiðr had originally been a practice among the Vanir, but that Freyja introduced it to the Æsir when she joined them. Based on this, universalist practitioners consider gender-based limitations on seiðr a prejudicial practice which subverts aspects of Norse liturgy.

==== Racial paganism ====
Germanic occultism and neopaganism emerged in the early 20th Century and became influential, with beliefs such as Ariosophy, combining with the far-right Völkisch movement which eventually culminated in Nazism. Post-WWII continuations of similar beliefs have given rise to the Wotansvolk, a white nationalist neopagan movement, in the late 20th Century.

Modern white supremacism and Neo-Nazism with all the racist, antisemitic, and anti-LGBTQ beliefs of those ideologies have either continued, infiltrated, and co-opted many Germanic and Norse Heathen traditions such as Ásatrú (sometimes called Odinism). These groups believe that these Norse-Germanic beliefs form the true Caucasian-European ethnoreligious group.

In his 1997 manifesto Vargsmål, Norwegian metal musician and racial pagan Varg Vikernes, claimed homosexuality a type of "spiritual defects [sic]" that results from men "develop[ing] womanly instincts" and women "who think they are men", but regarded female bisexuality as "natural" provided it doesn't reject attraction to men. In 2005, Vikernes claimed on his personal website that "you cannot be Pagan and homosexual or even tolerate homosexuality."

== LGBTQ-inclusive sects, paths, and traditions ==
=== Wicca ===
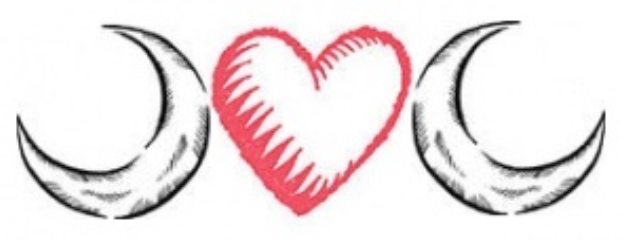
Original inclusive Wicca symbol created Wiccan author and scholar Yvonne Aburrow

Simplified vector derivative version based on Aburrow's original symbol

... all acts of love and pleasure are my rituals.

— Doreen Valiente, Charge of the Goddess

Wiccan traditions hold a wide range of differing beliefs about sexual orientation and gender identity. However, Wicca is regarded by many practitioners as a fertility religion. Starhawk wrote in her 1982 book Dreaming the Dark, "Sexuality was a sacrament in the Old Religion; it was (and is) viewed as a powerful force through which the healing, fructifying love of the immanent Goddess was directly known, and could be drawn down to nourish the world, to quicken fertility in human beings and in nature".

Newer Wiccan traditions often avoid or disregard the historical aversion to LGBTQ individuals. Oboler notes the change in neopagan culture thus, "Although the symbolic bedrock of Wicca and modern Paganism is strongly gender-essentialist, the Pagan community, like the culture as a whole, has been moving away from that position." These traditions sometimes cite the Wiccan Charge of the Goddess. Professor Melissa Harrington wrote that despite traditional Wicca showing heterosexism "as Wicca has grown and attracted gay practitioners they have begun to work out ways in which Wiccan rites can become more meaningful to them".

According to professor and Wicca author Ann-Marie Gallagher, "There is a moralistic doctrine or dogma other than the advice offered in the Wiccan Rede... The only 'law' here is love... It matters that we are gay, straight, bisexual or transgender– the physical world is sacred, and [we are] celebrating our physicality, sexuality, human nature and celebrating the Goddess, Giver of ALL life and soul of ALL nature."

The Pagan Federation of Canada stated, "Over the last few decades, many people have thought that the emphasis on male/female polarity in Wicca excludes homosexuals." However, the Federation goes on to make the case for the validity of LGBTQ orientations even within traditional Wicca, suggesting that gay men and lesbians are likely to be particularly alive to the interplay of the masculine and feminine principles in the Universe.

The adoption of horn symbology by non-men shown at certain pagan events, such as Mary Jo Neitz witnessed at Dragonfest in the 1990s, may have indicated increasing acceptance of gender fluidity and sexual diversity developing during that time period.

=== Unitarian Universalism ===
The Unitarian Universalist Association (UUA) states "we not only open our doors to people of all sexual orientations and gender identities, we value diversity of sexuality and gender and see it as a spiritual gift". The Covenant of Unitarian Universalist Pagans (CUUPS), the pagan-aligned affiliate of the UUA, echoes those beliefs with bylaws that state covenant membership "shall be open, without regard to race, color, sex, affectional or sexual orientation, gender expression, physical disability, national origin, or social condition."

=== Queer-specific paths ===
A symbol representing pagan gender diversity, combining the pentagram with various gender symbols, indicating acceptance and inclusion for the broad spectrum of gender identities.

==== Feri ====
The Feri Tradition, a modern form of traditional witchcraft has provided a home for many neopagan LGBTQ individuals. The Tradition is very open to non-heterosexual orientations and queer identities. Feri practitioner Storm Faerywolf writes:

"As any Queer practitioner can attest, there is a definite shortage of Queer-specific models that encourage the strengthening of ourselves as whole beings. In many Neo-Pagan Witchcraft traditions, we are told simply to adopt the pre-existing (and heterosexist) magickal modalities of polarity and fertility. In the Feri tradition we are given certain tools that enable us to have healthier relationships with our Divine natures, devoid of any such baggage."

==== Minoan ====
Two Minoan traditions were founded in New York City in the 1970s. Minoan initiations and elevations are all conducted in single-gender circles. Both traditions continue to this day as oath-bound, initiatory mystery religions using a ritual framework descended from Gardnerian Wicca.

- Minoan Brotherhood founded in 1975 by Edmund Buczynski, an elder in the Gardnerian, WICA, and New York Welsh Traditions, to create a tradition for gay and bisexual men—one that would celebrate and explore the distinctive mysteries unique to men who love men.
- Minoan Sisterhood founded in 1976 by Lady Rhea and Lady Miw-Sekhmet, in collaboration with Buczynski, as the women's counterpart to the Brotherhood.

==== Phoenix ====
The Fellowship of the Phoenix (originally "Brotherhood") was founded in the summer of 2004 by seven gay men from diverse traditions such as ceremonial magic, shamanism, and pre-Gardnerian witchcraft to create an ecumenical neopagan tradition which serves the community of men who love men. The maxim of the Fellowship is "Find the Divine within your own experience." In 2017, the Seattle Temple began a reformation within the group to expand the tradition to be "open to all queer/LBGTQIA adults" which has been accepted throughout. Fellowship theology has been modified to fit an expanded, inclusive model.

==== Radical Faeries ====
The Radical Faeries began in the 1970s as a predominantly gay male-oriented movement. The Faeries today are a loosely affiliated worldwide network and countercultural movement seeking to redefine queer consciousness through secular spirituality; the movement also adopts elements from anarchism and environmentalism. Certain events may be focused on gay male spirituality, while others are open to all genders and orientations.

== See also ==
- Haitian Vodou and sexual orientation
- Homosexuality and religion
- LGBTQ themes in mythology
- Religion and LGBTQ people
- Religion and sexuality
- Transgender people and religion

== Bibliography ==
- Berger, Helen A.; Leach, Evan A.; Shaffer, Leigh S. (2003). Voices from the pagan census : a national survey of witches and neo-pagans in the United States. Columbia, S.C.: University of South Carolina Press. ISBN 1-57003-488-5. OCLC 51566739.
- Berger, Helen A. (1 April 2012). "Contemporary Paganism: Fifteen Years Later". Alternative Spirituality and Religion Review. 3 (1): 3–14. doi:10.5840/asrr20123114.
- Cragle, Joshua Marcus (2017). "Contemporary Germanic/Norse Paganism and Recent Survey Data". The Pomegranate: The International Journal of Pagan Studies. 19 (1). Equinox Publishing: 77–116. doi:10.1558/pome.30714. Archived from the original on 28 June 2021.
- Kraemer, Christine Hoff (2012). "Gender and Sexuality in Contemporary Paganism". Religion Compass. 6 (8). Wiley-Blackwell Publishing, Ltd.: 390–401. doi:10.1111/j.1749-8171.2012.00367.x. Archived from the original on 27 June 2021.
- Lepage, Martin (12 August 2014). "A Lokian Family: Queer and Pagan Agency in Montreal". The Pomegranate: The International Journal of Pagan Studies. 15 (1–2). Equinox Publishing: 79–101. doi:10.1558/pome.v15i1-2.79. Archived from the original on 28 June 2021.
- Lewis, James R. (18 July 2013). "The Pagan Explosion Revisited: A Statistical Postmortem on the Teen Witch Fad". Pomegranate. 14 (1): 128–139. doi:10.1558/pome.v14i1.128. ISSN 1743-1735. Archived from the original on 21 May 2025.
- Lewis, James R.; Tøllefsen, Inga Bårdsen (12 August 2014). "Gender and Paganism in Census and Survey Data". The Pomegranate: The International Journal of Pagan Studies. 15 (1–2). doi:10.1558/pome.v15i1-2.61. Archived from the original on 27 June 2021.
- Mueller, Michelle (6 October 2017). "The Chalice and the Rainbow: Conflicts Between Women's Spirituality and Transgender Rights in US Wicca in the 2010s". In Bårdsen Tøllefsen, Inga; Giudice, Christian (eds.). Female Leaders in New Religious Movements. Palgrave Macmillan Cham. pp. 249–278. doi:10.1007/978-3-319-61527-1. ISBN 978-3-319-61526-4. Archived from the original on 27 June 2021.
- Neitz, Mary Jo (2000). "Queering the Dragonfest: Changing Sexualities in a Post-Patriarchal Religion". Sociology of Religion. 61 (4): 369–391. doi:10.2307/3712521. JSTOR 3712521. Archived from the original on 27 June 2021.
- Oboler, Regina Smith (5 June 2011). "Negotiating Gender Essentialism in Contemporary Paganism". The Pomegranate: The International Journal of Pagan Studies. 12 (2). Equinox Publishing: 159–184. doi:10.1558/pome.v12i2.159. Archived from the original on 27 June 2021.
- Orion, Loretta (1995). Never Again the Burning Times: Paganism Revived. Prospect Heights, IL: Waveland Press. ISBN 978-0-88133-835-5. OCLC 31898212.
- Starhawk (1979). The spiral dance : a rebirth of the ancient religion of the great goddess (1st ed.). San Francisco: Harper San Francisco. ISBN 978-0-06-067535-6. OCLC 5334164.
- Starhawk (1999) [1979]. The spiral dance : a rebirth of the ancient religion of the great goddess (20th Anniversary ed.). San Francisco: Harper San Francisco. ISBN 978-0-06-250815-7. OCLC 41488828.
