= Lady Rhea =

American Wiccan

Aurelia Bila, also known as Lady Rhea, is an American business woman and Gardnerian high priestess within the Wiccan neo-pagan religion. In 1992, she opened Magickal Realms (Enchanted Candle Shoppe Inc.) in Greenwich Village, later relocating to The Bronx, where she co-operates the shop with Lady Zoradia.

Bila supported the Minoan Brotherhood with Lord Gwyddion (aka Edmund Buczynski), and later co-founded the Minoan Sisterhood with Carol Bulzone (also known as Lady Miw). Bila self describes as being "of the Gardnerian and Welsh Tradition but considers herself and all of her children as Edwardians from her High Priest and teacher Edmund Buczynski." Wiccans who have studied under her and been initiated into the craft include Lexa Roséan.

Throughout her career, she has mentored and educated New Yorkers on witchcraft and occult practices spanning multiple generations. Bila continues to hold a relevant position within both magick activism and modern witchcraft.

== Early life ==
Bila was reared in the Bronx. Raised in an Italian and Catholic home, her family regularly attended Sunday service. Her interest in witchcraft is started when she first saw Fantasia at five years old. Throughout her childhood, she attended public school until the ninth grade where she transferred to a beauty high school located on the Grand Concourse. Upon entering beauty high school, she frequented local botanicas in the area, this is where she was initially introduced to Afro-Caribbean beliefs such as Santeria. This began her journey into the occult. Upon reading the book The Gypsy Witch Fortune Teller, Bila experienced an awakening that drove her further into training in search of a crystal ball.

This search for a crystal ball led to her arrival at the store called Warlock Shoppe, which introduced her to Herman Slater in 1972. Slater would eventually employ Bila at his store, Magickal Childe, in Manhattan and serve as a mentor. While working, she waited on customers, weighed herbs, and shared knowledge about Wicca. This location would become the epicenter of occult culture and practice in New York. While working at this store, Bila had the opportunity to meet key figures such as Eddie Buczynski.

== Work with Minoan Brotherhood ==
Training alongside Buczynski, Bila began practicing the Welsh tradition. Aiding in the formation of the Minoan Brotherhood starting in 1977. They both sought to allow same-sex couples the opportunity to equally participate in rituals. Despite the Minoan Brotherhood being exclusively male, there was still an underlying emphasis on gender equality. Aspects of this belief are highlighted by marking the tradition's primary deity as the Cretan Snake Goddess. Soon after Bila's establishment as high priestess, her then-husband Ammund also became initiated.

After the passing of Buczynski, she stated that individuals initiated into the brotherhood would refer to themselves as an "Edwardian Wiccan" as a gesture of honor for his work.

In 1978, Bila joined the Minoan Sisterhood with Carol Bulzone, another group started by Buczynski.

== Career ==
=== Enchanted Candles ===
While working at Magickal Childe in 1979, Bila began her first adventure into entrepreneurship through a product called "The Enchanted Candle." Beginning by selling at Magickal Childe, she eventually sold them at her own stores, Enchantments and Magickal Realms, starting in 1982. They are a tall, cylindrical candles containing hand carved seals, exotic oils for scent, and glitter designs. Prayers for "uncrossing, healing, weight loss, love drawing, and fast luck" are included as possible results. On her website, customers can choose from candles focused in a breadth of different areas such as love, finance, blessing, energy, and motivation. She would later publish a book titled The Enchanted Candle, revealing the process behind creating them and their ingredients. This product soon became a popular cult fixture in the New York occult scene.

=== Shops ===
Starting in 1982, Lady Rhea opened a store called Enchantments with Bulzone. Located on 9th street in the East Village of Manhattan. Bila stated in an interview that she "wanted to bring more of the craft to the public" but the driving factor to open the store was "in dedication to the gods (3:42)." She sold her stake in Enchantments in 1987.

In the years after leaving Enchantments, Bila relied on her publication and consultation job with Original Products, one of the largest Botanicas in the world. During this time period, she studied Santeria. In 1992, she decided to leave Original Products for other pursuits.

But, that was not the end of her entrepreneurial career. Bila opened Magickal Realms in 1992, initially located in Greenwich Village, before relocating to the Bronx in 1995. This store sells a variety of oddities related to sympathetic magic. A collection of items are carried in her store such as candles, incense, exotic oils, and herbs just to name a few. Today, Magickal Realms is one of the largest botanica shops in the world.

=== Tarot card readings ===
Bila's interest in tarot card readings began when she was 12 after playing with a Ouija board for divination. At the time, there were few professional tarot card readers in New York. In 1966 she, accordioning to herself, wandered into the Bronx Village Shop, a small store on Kingsbridge Road. The owner, who went by the name "Chinky" was a small Nuyorican woman who quickly became fast friends with Bila. Chinky was the first person to teach her how to read Spanish Tarot Cards. After Chinky's training, she read cards for Bronx Village Shop customers. Ever since then, she regularly performs tarot card reading out of her shop, Magickal Realms.

== Community contributions ==
In addition to her entrepreneurial impact on New York, Bila incorporates community activism to raise awareness of witchcraft. As the founder of the annual Witch Pride Parade in New York, she fights for acceptance of pagan or occult practices in society. she says "The Witch Pride Parade isn't because I need rights. The Witch Pride Parade is because people need to understand we're not demonologists. We're not satanists. We're not anti anything. We are earth worshipers. We want to worship our old gods without people going to persecution." Her goal of raising awareness is intersected with a goal of bringing different religious backgrounds together under one event. This effort to work in solidarity with other religions highlights her desire to destigmatize paganism along with others. She acknowledges evangelical protestors at the parades, with the perception that "they have a right to their beliefs, but don't step on somebody else's."

Alongside her work for The Witch Pride Parade, she also mentors young witches. She urges young individuals who are interested to seek out opportunities for information such as events, books, and shops.

== Beliefs and practices ==
Bila's first introduction into paganism and witchcraft started with Santeria. This hybrid of paganism and Catholicism allowed her to further explore Minoan and Wicca.

Bila received her priestess name, Lady Rhea, based on Rhea, the Great Mother Goddess who watched over the Minoan pantheon. The Great Mother Goddess is attributed as the creator of the Milky Way in Minoan practice. Minoan deities were passed on by later Greeks. Homer and Diodorus Siculus notably mention Minoan deities in their writing and inform much of the modern understanding of their practices. Legend describes Mount Ida (Crete) as Rhea's sacred place, where she birthed her son, Zeus, in order to hide him from his father, Cronos. Though later writers describe Rhea as a fertility goddess, Minoan belief would push back against this ideal. Rather, Minoans perceived Rhea as a focus of the land itself, referring to the land and earth sacred as a living thing. This concept of Rhea as a source of life through earth defines the general beliefs of Minoans. Similarly rejecting ideas of dispensation where resources can be bought and sold.

Bila described her own spiritual journey as "eclectic." In addition to witchcraft, she has initiations in Tibetan Buddhism, is a devotee of Santa Muerte and works with a large pantheon of deities, including Hindu, as well as the Orishas." She describes it as "religion based on ecology, its preserving mother earth." This wide breadth of devotions is further reflected in her shop Magickal Realms.

While she practices Wicca and bases much of her training on sympathetic magic, she rejects sacrifices. Referring to the movie The Wicker Man, Bila points out that witches receive a bad rap from Hollywood through misleading representation and references to the devil or Satan's mistress.

Today, she views witchcraft as being in a modern renaissance. Where astrology and modern understandings of Wiccan combined with other pagan religions can bring in younger generations to practice.

== Published work ==
=== Handfasted and Heartjoined ===
Published in 2001, Bila's book Handfasted and Heartjoined, details the traditional wedding rituals of handfasting. With the rise in Wicca, Witchcraft, and Paganism, Bila felt there was a need to reignite traditional knowledge about the ritual of handfasting. The book offers information on how to conduct a handfasting ceremony, empowering a new family, and dealing with non-pagan friends/relatives.

=== The Enchanted Candle ===
In 2004, Bila published her book The Enchanted Candle, based on the hand-carved, embellished candles she has made for years. Within this publication, Lady Rhea details rituals associated with a breadth of topics and provides informational steps on how to perform these. This know-how is coupled with explanations for why these rituals work and what to expect to achieve. In 2016, she released an expanded version of the 2004 publication.

=== The Enchanted Formulary: Blending Magickal Oils for Love, Prosperity and Healing ===
She published a second book, The Enchanted Formulary: Blending Magickal Oils for Love, Prosperity, and Healing, in September 2006. This book details the blends, fragrances, and oil related to Wicca practices. These allow readers to practice their own spells, candle magick, anointed sacred objects, mojo bags, ritual bathing, and incense. Bila details all her recipes she has collected over thirty years of training.

Also included in the book are details on technique, one can expect to learn mixology and magickal application skills that reinforce understanding of astrology. She alleges that applications of these recipes or practices can lead to finding love, luck, and success.

== Personal life ==
Bila is an open Lesbian.

== Bibliography ==
- The Enchanted Candle (2004) ISBN 0-8065-2578-9
- The Enchanted Formulary (2006) ISBN 0-8065-2704-8
