= Wiccan morality =

Religious ethics

The pentagram within a circle, a symbol of faith used by many Wiccans, sometimes called a pentacle

Wiccan morality is largely expressed in the Wiccan Rede: "An ye harm none, do what ye will"—old-fashioned language for "as long as you aren't harming anyone, do as you wish". While this could be interpreted to mean "do no harm at all," it is usually interpreted as a declaration of the freedom to act, along with the necessity of thinking through and taking responsibility for the consequences of one's actions.

Another element of Wiccan morality is expressed in the Law of Threefold Return, which is understood to mean that whatever one does to another person or thing (benevolent or otherwise) returns with triple force. Opinions differ on whether the form taken by the return of harmful actions might include bad reputation, revenge by others, negative emotional states, an uneasy conscience, poor luck, malign magical influences, something resembling the Hindu concept of karma, or some combination of some or all of these, and also on to what extent the number three should be interpreted poetically rather than literally.

Many Wiccans also seek to cultivate a set of eight virtues mentioned in Doreen Valiente's Charge of the Goddess, these being mirth, reverence, honour, humility, strength, beauty, power and compassion.

== Wiccan Rede ==
Wiccan morality is expressed in a brief statement found within a text called the Wiccan Rede: "An it harm none, do what you will." ("An" is an archaic word meaning "if".) The Rede differs from some other well-known moral codes (such as Christian or Islamic notion of sin) in that, while it does contain a prohibition, it is largely an encouragement to act freely. It is normally considered that the prohibition against harm also covers self-harm. "Rede" means advice, as such it is not so much a law that must be followed as advice that it is recommended one follows—not following it would be considered folly more than rule-breaking, though for a group that calls itself "Wise" it follows that such folly would be strongly avoided.

A common belief amongst Wiccans is that no magic, even of a beneficent nature, should be performed on any other person without that person's direct informed consent. This stems from the understanding that it would interfere with that person's free will and thus constitute "harm". 'Love spells' are very much frowned upon by the greater Wiccan community for precisely this reason.

The Rede's origin is unknown, its earliest mention being by Doreen Valiente at a meeting held by the witchcraft magazine "Pentagram". Gerald Gardner compared the moral code of witches with the legendary ethic of the fabled King Pausol which was "Do what you like so long as you harm no one". Nevertheless, the similarity of the phrasing of the Rede (and explicit and verbatim phrasing of other texts) suggests that this statement is partly based on the Law of Thelema as stated by occultist Aleister Crowley, "Do what thou wilt is the whole of the Law. Love is the law, love under will", itself deriving from Rabelais' phrase "fay çe que vouldras" ("Do what thou wilt"). While the wording of the Rede may have been influenced by the Law of Thelema, there are significant differences: Thelemites consider True Will to be like the idea of a "higher calling" or filling one's niche, based on personal skills. This leads to different interpretations of "do what you will" than that of the Wiccan Rede.

== Rule of Three ==
Many Wiccans also promote the Law of Threefold Return, a belief that anything that one does will be returned to them threefold. In other words, good deeds are magnified in like form back to the doer, and so are ill deeds.

A possible prototype to the Rule of Three may be found in the prescribed ritual practice of the newly initiated second degree Wiccan scourging "her" initiator with three times as many blows at the end of the ceremony as "she" has received from "him" at the beginning. Gardner maintained that his 1949 novel High Magic's Aid contained elements of Wiccan belief presented in the form of fiction, and he wrote of this scourging: "For this is the joke of Witchcraft, the Witch knows though the initiate does not, that she will get three times what she gave, so she does not strike hard."

== Wiccan Laws ==
Many lineaged Wiccans also follow, or at least consider, a set of 161 laws, commonly called the Ardanes. A common criticism of these rules is that they represent outdated concepts and/or produce counterproductive results in Wiccan contexts. Modern authors, specifically Doreen Valiente, have also noted that these rules were most likely invented by Gardner himself in mock-archaic language as the byproduct of inner conflict within Gerald Gardner's original coven over the issue of press relations, to justify Gardner's own authority over that of his High Priestess.

== See also ==
- Harm principle
- Non-aggression principle
- Nonviolence
