= Lexa Roséan =

American writer, dancer and Wiccan

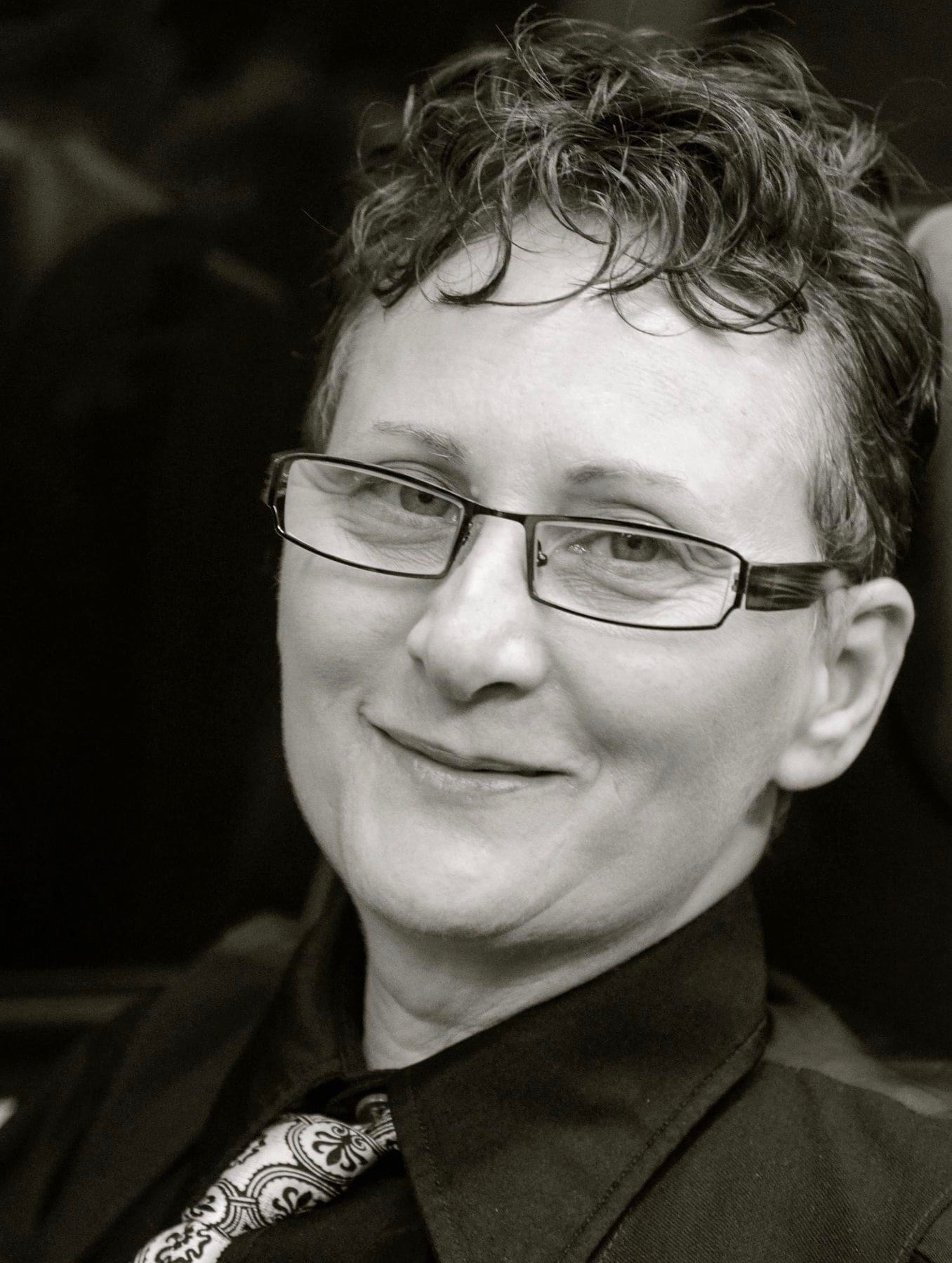
- Photo: Carlos Costes (2020)
- Born: 1958 (age 67–68)
- Other name: Supermarket Sorceress
- Occupations: Writer; dancer; psychoanalyst; magickal consultant
- Website: lexarosean.com

Lexa Roséan (born May 1958), is an American writer, dancer and licensed psychoanalyst as well as a Wiccan high priestess in the neo-Gardnerian Minoan tradition. She lives in New York City.

Also known as the Supermarket Sorceress, she was voted "Best Witch in NYC" by The Village Voice in 2005. As a lecturer and pagan writer she has authored and published eight books on spellcraft, Wicca, astrology, and Tarot (four of which have been translated into German, Polish and Russian).

In 2015, Roséan completed her master's degree in Psychoanalysis and in 2022, certification at a psychoanalytic institute in New York City.

== Early life ==
Originally from Miami, Roséan also grew up in Colorado. Her family became "baalat teshuva" (meaning: to return to the faith) and joined the Orthodox Hasidic community. It was then that Roséan also became actively interested in Kabbalah – the study of which was forbidden to women. At age 15, she came out as a lesbian and was officially excommunicated by a Beis Din (council of Rabbis).

In 1976 she moved to New York City, New York, to attend the Stern College for Women at Yeshiva University, which she graduated with a B. A. in English and Communications in 1980. As part of her studies, she worked as an intern from 1976 to 1982 at the Actors Studio where she studied with Lee Strasberg, Shelley Winters and Ellen Burstyn.

== Career ==
In 1982 Roséan began her education as a witch, initially working as a solitary, then joined the Minoan Sisterhood study group, where she was initiated by Lady Rhea and Lady Miw. She was the Priestess for the Minoan Sisterhood training circle from 1982 to 2000. During those years, in addition to giving astrological and psychic readings, she also taught astrology, Tarot, Kabbalah, Wicca, astral projection, and spellcraft, and served as the official coven oracle. In an interview on Fox 5 with Alan Colmes in the Strategy Room in 2009, asked for her religious background, Roséan winkingly uses the term "JeWitch" and refers to herself as a Magickal Consultant.

She has been the subject of numerous articles in publications including The New York Times, Newsday, USA Today, Voice of Russia and Marie Claire (Chinese edition), as well as a featured guest on television programs, including CNN, 20/20 The Joan Rivers Show, MTV, Food Network, and Fox News. Kate Walter, writing for The Village Voice, described Roséan as "a cross between a psychic and a shrink".

In 2015, Roséan completed her master's degree in Psychoanalysis at the New York Graduate School of Psychoanalysis (NYGSP). The title of her thesis, delivered in December 2014, is Dancing with the Locos: A Comparative Study of Argentine Tango and Psychoanalysis. In 2022, she completed her certificate candidacy at the psychoanalytic institute CMPS in New York City. She was an associate editor of The Analyst, the newsletter of the Society of Modern Psychoanalysis from 2017 to 2020.

== Writing ==
Aside from her writing on the occult, Roséan is also a playwright, short-story writer, poet and novelist. Her plays, which include The Swim, The Prisoner (1993/94), Lesbians in the Bible, and I Married a Lesbian Witch (1995/96), have been produced at New York City theatres, including The WOW Café, La Mama, Dixon Place, and PS 122. Her short stories have been published in various journals as well as anthologized in the collections Women on Women 2 and Celebrating the Pagan Soul. "A Kosher Megila" an excerpt from her novel, Spinoza's Daughter, was also included in Women on Women 3. Her poetry can be found on the Knitting Factory's 100 Greatest Poets album, and was reviewed by Michael Musto in The Village Voice.

Through her writing on pagan subjects, she is also known as the "Supermarket Sorceress". She has authored and published eight books on spellcraft, Wicca, astrology, and Tarot (four of which have been translated into German, Polish and Russian); she has written special articles as well as a monthly astrology column for publications such as CosmoGirl, Seventeen and the ReporTango Magazine.

== Tango ==
Lexa Roséan initially became interested in Tango Argentino in 1984 when she saw the show Tango Argentino on Broadway. But it was not until 1995, in a tango lesson taught by Brigitta Winkler, that she set upon the journey to learn the dance. In 2001, Roséan was invited to teach her own classes at the New York City dance school Paul Pellicoro's DanceSport. Among her most influential teachers were Carlos Gavito, Susana Miller, Laura Grinbank, Cacho Dante, Pupi Castillo, Graciela Gonzalez, Omar Vega and Alicia Cruzado.

In 2007 (with Kumi Ueki), 2008 (with Gayle Gibbons Madeira) and 2009 (with Sarah La Rocca) Roséan competed in the US Tango Championship. In the three consecutive years she placed third in Salon Tango and in 2008, together with Gayle Madeira, first in Stage Tango.

Also in 2008, Roséan hosted the first weekly lesbian milonga in New York City's West Village, at the Rubyfruit Bar and Grill. In 2009, Roséan was invited to the Queer Hamburg Tango Festival as a guest teacher, DJ and performer. In 2010, as part of New York City's first Queer Tango Festival, she taught, DJ'd and performed at various venues including the Players Club. In 2012 she guest DJ'd at the Queer Tango Festival in Berlin. Roséan teaches privately in New York City, DJs, and dances social tango.

== Awards ==
- 2015 Rose F. McAloon Award for Excellence in a master's thesis for Dancing with the Locos: A Comparative Study of Argentine Tango and Psychoanalysis
- 2019 AIT Award for Student Writing by the National Association for the Advancement of Psychoanalysis (NAAP) for Unconscious fantasy: Wrestling with the clown
- 2023 Winner of Essay Contest with The Office, Society for Psychoanalysis and Psychoanalytic Psychology, Division 39, American Psychological Association
- 2023 Phyllis W. Meadow Award for Excellence in a Final Research Project, by Center for Modern Psychoanalytic Studies

== Works ==
=== Short fiction ===
- 1993 "amaizeN". In: Holoch, Naomi; Nestle, Joan (eds.): Women On Women 2: An Anthology of American Lesbian Short Fiction. New York: Plume. ISBN 9780452269996.
- 1996 "A Kosher Megila". In: Holoch, Naomi; Nestle, Joan (eds.): Women On Women 3: A New Anthology of American Lesbian Fiction. New York: Plume. pp. 243–253. ISBN 9780452276611.

=== Pagan writing ===
- 1996 The Supermarket Sorceress: Spells, Charms, & Enchantments That You Can Make From Supermarket Ingredients. New York: St. Martin's Paperbacks. ISBN 9780312957681
- 1997 The Supermarket Sorceress's Sexy Hexes. New York: St. Martin's Paperbacks. ISBN 9780312963286.
  - 1999 in German: Das Hexen-1x1 für erotische Momente. München: Ullstein. ISBN 978-3548359403.
- 1998 The Supermarket Sorceress's Enchanted Evenings. New York: St. Martin's Paperbacks. ISBN 9780312966737.
  - 1999 in german: Das Hexen-1x1 für unvergeßliche Nächte. München: Ullstein. ISBN 978-3548359410.
- 1999 Easy Enchantments: All the Spells You'll Ever Need For Any Occasion. New York: St. Martin's Griffin. ISBN 9780312242961.
  - 1999 in german: Das Hexen-1x1 für jede Gelegenheit. München: Ullstein. ISBN 978-3548359397.
- 2001 PowerSpells: Get the Magical Edge in Business, Work, Relationships, and Life. New York: St. Martin's Griffin. ISBN 9780312274764.
- 2002 Zodiac Spells: Easy Enchantments and Simple Spells for Your Sun Sign. New York: St. Martin's Griffin. ISBN 9780312285449.
- 2005 "Bitchin’ at the Gods". In: Laura A. Wildman (ed.): Celebrating the Pagan Soul – Our Own Stories of Inspiration and Community. Citadel Press. pp. 231–234. ISBN 9780806526249.
- 2005 The Encyclopedia of Magickal Ingredients: A Wiccan Guide to Spellcasting. New York: Paraview Pocket Books. ISBN 9781416525158
  - 2017 in Polish: Encyklopedia magicznych ingrediencji: Wiccański przewodnik po sztuce rzucania zaklęć. Kraków: Wydawnictwo Vis-à-vis Etiuda. ISBN 9788379981434.
- 2005 Tarot Power: 22 Keys to Unlocking Magick, Spellcraft, and Meditation. New York: Citadel Press. ISBN 9780806526676.

=== Psychoanalytic research ===
- Dancing with the Locos: A Comparative Study of Argentine Tango and Psychoanalysis. Masters Thesis, presented to the New York Graduate School of Psychoanalysis (NYGSP), December 2014.
- "Unconscious fantasy: Wrestling with the clown". In: Faye Newsome (ed): Modern Psychoanalysis. The journal of the Center for Modern Psychoanalytic Studies, 42: 39–52 (no 1), YBK Publishers, New York 2017.

== See also ==
- List of dancers
- List of non-fiction writers
- List of Pagans
- List of people from New York City
- List of playwrights from the United States
- List of poets from the United States
