= Rule of Three (Wicca) =

Religious tenet

The Rule of Three (also Three-fold Law or Law of Return) is a religious tenet held by some Wiccans, Neo-Pagans and occultists. It states that whatever energy a person puts out into the world, be it positive or negative, will be returned to that person three times. Some subscribe to a variant of this law in which return is not necessarily threefold.

According to occult author/researcher John Coughlin, the Law posits "a literal reward or punishment tied to one's actions, particularly when it comes to working magic". The law is not a universal article of faith among Wiccans, and "there are many Wiccans, experienced and new alike, who view the Law of Return as an over-elaboration on the Wiccan Rede." Some Wiccans believe that it is a modern innovation based on Christian morality.

The Rule of Three has been compared by Karl Lembke to other ethics of reciprocity, such as the concept of karma in Dharmic religions and the Golden Rule.

The Rule of Three has a possible prototype in a piece of Wiccan liturgy which first appeared in print in Gerald Gardner's 1949 novel High Magic's Aid:

"Thou hast obeyed the Law. But mark well, when thou receivest good, so equally art bound to return good threefold." (For this is the joke in witchcraft, the witch knows, though the initiate does not, that she will get three times what she gave, so she does not strike hard.)

However, The Threefold Law as an actual "law", was an interpretation of Wiccan ideas and ritual, first publicised by noted witch Raymond Buckland, in his books on Wicca. Prior to this, Wiccan ideas of reciprocal ethics were far less defined and more often interpreted as a kind of general karma.

Raymond Buckland made a reference to an ethical threefold law in a 1968 article for Beyond magazine. The Rule of Three later features within a poem of 26 couplets titled "Rede of the Wiccae", published by Lady Gwen Thompson in 1975 in Green Egg vol. 8, no. 69 and attributed to her grandmother Adriana Porter. The threefold rule is referenced often by the Wiccans of the Clan Mackenzie in the S.M. Stirling Emberverse novels.

This rule was described by the Dutch metal band Nemesea, in the song "Threefold Law", from the album Mana.
