= Wiccan Rede =

Wicca moral statement

The Wiccan Rede /ˈriːd/ is a statement that provides the key moral system in the new religious movement of Wicca and certain other related witchcraft-based faiths. A common form of the Rede is "An ye harm none, do what ye will" which was taken from a longer poem also titled the Wiccan Rede.

The word "rede" derives from Middle English, meaning "advice" or "counsel", and being closely related to the German Rat or Scandinavian råd. "An'" is an archaic Middle English conjunction, meaning "if." "Ye" is an archaic or dialectal form of "you" (nominative plural).

== History ==
In its best known form as the "eight words" couplet, the Rede was first publicly recorded in a 1964 speech by Doreen Valiente. Other variants of the Rede include:

- Eight words the Wiccan Rede fulfill, An it harm none do what ye will. Note: this is the first published form of the couplet, quoted from Doreen Valiente in 1964. Later published versions include "ye" instead of "it" (as the second word, following 'An'): "Eight words the Wiccan Rede fulfill – An 'ye' harm none, do what ye will" (Earth Religion News, 1974); "wilt" rather than "will": "Eight words Wiccan Rede fulfill – An' it harm none, do what ye wilt" (Green Egg, 1975); "thou" instead of "ye" or "you", or "as" in place of "what", or any combination, e.g. "...An' (it/ye/you) harm none, do (as/what) (ye/thou/you) (wilt/will)":

Another notable antecedent was put forth by the philosopher John Stuart Mill with his harm principle in the 19th century. "Mill argues that the sole purpose of law should be to stop people from harming others and that should people want to participate in victimless crimes, crimes with no complaining witness, such as gambling, drug usage, engaging in prostitution, then they should not be encroached in doing so." In addition, the first part of the phrase is strikingly similar to the Latin maxim primum non nocere (first do no harm).

=== The Long Rede ===
A complete twenty-six line poem entitled "The Wiccan Rede" was published in the Spring 1974 issue of neopagan magazine Earth Religion News. Each line contained a rhymed couplet laid out as a single line, the last line being the familiar "short rede" couplet beginning "Eight words...".

This poem was shortly followed by another, slightly different, version, entitled the "Rede of the Wiccae", which was published in Green Egg magazine by Lady Gwen Thompson. She ascribed it to her grandmother Adriana Porter, and claimed that the earlier published text was distorted from "its original form". The poem has since been very widely circulated and has appeared in other versions and layouts, with additional or variant passages. It is commonly known as the "Long Rede".

Although Thompson wrote that this version of the Rede was in its original form, this declaration is disputed for several reasons, but primarily as the language of the poem refers to Wiccan concepts that are not known to have existed in her grandmother's lifetime. It is sometime ascribed to Thompson herself. Mathiesen and Theitic concluded that 18 to 20 of the verses are lore which would be common to the area of rural 17th to 19th century New England and compiled by the hand of someone who would have been born no later that the late 19th century, and that at least six of the verses which are deemed "The Wiccan Verses" were compiled and added by a second and later hand. Since Thompson was dispensing these 26 as a whole from around 1969 it is a reasonable assumption that hers was that second hand. Another claim is that it is adapted from a speech given by Doreen Valiente at a dinner sponsored by the Witchcraft Research Association and mentioned in volume one (1964) of the Pentagram, a United Kingdom pagan newsletter then being published. Valiente did publish a poem The Witches Creed in her 1978 book, "Witchcraft for Tomorrow", which contains some similar concepts.

=== Dating the Rede ===
King Pausole, a character in Pierre Louÿs' Les aventures du roi Pausole (The Adventures of King Pausole, published in 1901), issued a similar pair of edicts: I. — Ne nuis pas à ton voisin. II. — Ceci bien compris, fais ce qu'il te plaît. ("Do not harm your neighbor; this being well understood, do that which pleases you.") In Thelema, a similar phrase, "Do what thou wilt shall be the whole of the Law", appears in Aleister Crowley's works by 1904, in The Book of the Law. Although Gardner noted the similarity of the rede to King Pausole's words, Silver Ravenwolf believes it is more directly referencing Crowley.

According to Don Frew, Valiente composed the couplet, following Gardner's statement that witches "are inclined to the morality of the legendary Good King Pausol, 'Do what you like so long as you harm none'"; he claims the common assumption that the Rede that was copied from Crowley is misinformed, and has resulted in the words often being misquoted as "an it harm none, do what thou wilt" instead of "do what you will".

Thompson's attribution of the Long Rede to her grandmother has been disputed, since Adriana Porter died in 1946, well before Gerald Gardner published The Old Laws, and no evidence for Porter's authorship exists other than Thompson's word. The poem refers to Wiccan concepts that, though ostensibly very old, have not been proven to pre-date the 1940s. Its attribution to Porter may have formed part of Thompson's claim to be a hereditary witch. Its precise origin has yet to be determined.

Adrian Bott, in an article written in White Dragon magazine, 2003, argues that the Long Rede's creation can be placed somewhere between 1964 and 1975. Bott bases his argument on the alleged misuse of archaic English in the poem, in particular of " an' " as an abbreviation of "and", and of "ye" instead of "the". Bott states that the author of the poem was evidently unaware that this contraction of "and" is not an archaic, but a modern convention. According to Bott, in the "eight words" couplet originally cited by Valiente, "an'" is used correctly, in the Middle English sense of " 'in the event that', or simply 'if' " (as in the Shakespearean "an hadst thou not come to my bed") and thus has no apostrophe. In the poem, this has been transformed into an abbreviated "and" and given an apostrophe, with every "and" in the poem's additional lines then being written " an' " as if to match. Accordingly, Bott concludes that the poem was an attempt to expand Valiente's couplet into a full Wiccan credo, written by someone who misunderstood the archaic language they attempted to imitate.

Robert Mathiesen repeats Bott's objection to "ye", but argues that most other archaisms are used correctly. However, he states that they all derive from late 19th century revivalist usages. Based on this fact Mathiesen concludes that early twentieth century authorship of at least part of the poem is probable. He argues that its references to English folklore are consistent with Porter's family history. His provisional conclusion is that a folkloric form of the poem may have been written by Porter, but that it was supplemented and altered by Thompson to add specifically Wiccan material. Mathiessen also takes the view that the last line was probably a Thompson addition derived from Valiente. According to this account, the 1974 variant of the text, which was published by one of Thompson's former initiates, may represent one of the earlier drafts. Its publication prompted Thompson to publish what she – falsely, according to Mathiessen – claimed was Porter's "original" poem.

== Interpretations ==
The Rede is similar to a consequentialist formulation of the Golden Rule, a belief that is found in nearly every religion. Not all traditional Wiccans follow the Rede; some Gardnerians (a sect under Wicca) espouse the Charge of the Goddess as a guide for morality. Its line "Keep pure your highest ideal, strive ever towards it; let naught stop you or turn you aside, for mine is the secret door which opens upon the door of youth" is used as a maxim for ethical dilemmas.

There is some debate in the neopagan and Wiccan communities as to the meaning of the Rede. The debate centres on the concept of the Rede being advice, not a commandment. The rejection of specific exhortations and prohibitions of conduct such as those given in the Judeo-Christian Ten Commandments and emphasis on the consequences of one's actions makes the Rede's character somewhat different from major religious texts such as the Bible or the Qur'an. The Rede is only a guideline which the individual must interpret to fit each particular situation and unlike most religions, which actions "do harm" (and which do not) are not discussed in the Rede. What exactly does and does not do harm is therefore open to personal interpretation.

The concept of ethical reciprocity is not explicitly stated, but most Wiccans interpret the Rede to imply the Golden Rule in the belief that the spirit of the Rede is to actively do good for one's fellow humans as well as for oneself. Different sects of Wiccans read "none" differently. "None" can apply to only the self, or it may include animals and/or plants, and so forth. In essence, the Rede can be fully understood as meaning that one should always follow their true will instead of trying to obtain simple wants and to ensure that following one's will does not harm anyone or anything. In this light, the Rede can be seen as encouraging a Wiccan to take personal responsibility for their actions.

== See also ==
- Rule of Three (Wiccan)
- Utilitarianism
- Wiccan morality
