= Eddie Buczynski =

American Wiccan and gay rights activist

Edmund Buczynski
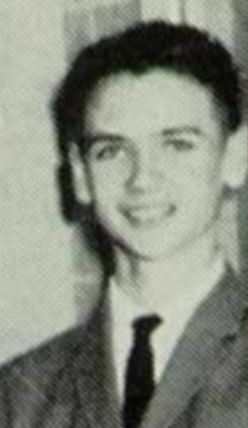
- Buczynski c. 1962
- Born: January 28, 1947; Brooklyn, New York City, United States
- Died: March 16, 1989 (aged 42)
- Occupations: Wiccan Priest; writer; archaeologist; gay rights activist
- Partner(s): Herman Slater (1972–1974); Bennie Geraci (1974–1979); Gene Muto (1978–1989, Buczynski's death)

Edmund Buczynski (January 28, 1947 – March 16, 1989) was an American Wiccan and archaeologist who founded Three separate traditions of Witchcraft: Welsh Traditionalist Witchcraft (1972), New York Wica Trad (1975, simply called then The Wica), and The Minoan Brotherhood (1977).

Born to a working-class family in New York City, Buczynski eventually embraced his homosexuality, moved to Greenwich Village, and immersed himself in the local gay scene. His relationship with Herman Slater led the two men to open The Warlock Shop, an occult supply store, in 1972. Following ordinations into various covens, Buczynski founded the Minoan Brotherhood in 1977 as a Wiccan tradition for gay and bisexual men. Buczynski was diagnosed with HIV/AIDS in 1988, and died the following year.

== Biography ==
=== Childhood: 1947–1964 ===
Eddie Buczynski was born on January 28, 1947, in Brooklyn, New York to working class parents. His father Edmund, who Eddie was named after, was the eldest son of Polish parents, and had been raised in a Brooklyn tenement with four brothers and two sisters. Edmund Sr. enlisted in the Naval Armed Guard in 1943, he fought in the Second World War aboard two Liberty ships, the SS John Howard and the SS José Marti. Eddie's mother, Marie Mauro, was the granddaughter of southern Italian immigrants, and had grown up in a Brooklyn apartment. She began communicating with her future husband in 1944 as pen pals before meeting him when he returned home on leave.

They married against their parents' wishes on April 27, 1946. Edmund Jr., was born nine months later. At the outbreak of the Korean War, Edmund senior was called back to active duty with the Navy Reserves. After his permanent discharge in October 1951, he moved his wife and child from Brooklyn to the middle-class neighborhood of Ozone Park, Queens.

In 1952, Buczynski started at the Old School Elementary in Queens, where he made good grades and particularly enjoyed music, reading, drawing, and painting. In August 1954, his mother gave birth to his first brother, Frank, who he would remain fond of despite the seven-year age gap. Although his family was Roman Catholic, he took an early interest in the pre-Christian religions of Ancient Egypt and Classical Greece, which he read about in books. He began devising and performing his own rituals to the deities of those religions, sparking his lifelong interest in contemporary paganism. His interest in pagan religion only increased following his father's sudden death from a heart attack at age 31 in August 1958. His mother married Edward Nascato in 1961.

Eddie eventually decided that he wanted to become a Roman Catholic priest, following in the footsteps of his uncle, Father Michael. He received Catholic confirmation in early 1961, and in September of that year he began his studies at the Monsignor McClancy Memorial High School in East Elmhurst. Bullied for being effeminate and homosexual, Eddie disliked the school, and he was ultimately expelled for being overly critical of their religious instruction.

In September 1962, he enrolled at John Adams High School, but was again bullied. He became increasingly rebellious, took up smoking cigarettes and marijuana, and made several suicide attempts. Family life became increasingly strained following the birth of a half-brother, Tommy, in September 1962, and in March 1964, he quit highschool and left home.

=== Herman Slater and embracing Wicca: 1964–1972 ===
From Ozone Park, he moved to Manhattan, where a counter-cultural community had built up around the Greenwich Village and the Lower East Side that contained an array of gay people, hippies, occultists and others adopting bohemian lifestyles. Without money, he resorted to working as a rent boy, and made use of both marijuana and LSD. Although he briefly returned to Catholicism, in 1971 he read a copy of Witchcraft Today (1954), a book authored by Englishman Gerald Gardner, the founder of Gardnerian Wicca, and it reignited his interest in pagan religion. In autumn of that year, he tracked down Leo Martello (1931–2000)– a prominent gay-rights activist and pagan witch, who practiced his own Italian-focused form of witchcraft, called Stregheria. Although Leo thought that Buczynski was too inexperienced in magic to begin practicing Stregheria, Leo befriended him and shared his contacts with him, and took him to visit Herman Slater (1935–1992)– a fellow New Yorker who was of Jewish heritage. Like Buczynski and Martello, Slater was gay, and a romantic relationship soon developed between Buczynski (who was attracted to bears) and the older man. Buczynski moved-in with Slater in an apartment in Brooklyn Heights in June 1972.

That year, the couple decided to open up an occult store, named The Warlock Shop, at 300 Henry Street in Brooklyn Heights, New York City. Alongside this venture, they also founded a company, called Earth Religion Supplies, Inc, which would later go into publishing. Officially opening on June 21, 1972, the back room of the shop would also be used for weekly lectures, and would be rented to various occult groups who wanted to assemble there.

Still eager to be initiated into a Wiccan coven, Buczsynki began contacting various covens, requesting initiation therein. The covens that he tried to join included the Gardnerian Wiccan coven in Louisville, Kentucky that was run by Fran and Gerry Fisher, and the Algard Wiccan coven that had been founded by Mary Nesnick; the former coven refused due to the long distance between them and Buczsynki, while the latter coven refused due to Buczynski's homosexuality. Buczsynki then approached Gwen Thompson (1928–1986)– the matriarch of the New England Covens of Traditionalist Witches (NECTW), asking for initiation, although he declined to inform her of his sexual orientation. Thompson took a liking to the young man, and welcomed him into her coven, where he proceeded to adopt the craft name of "Hermes". They developed a strong friendship, much to Slater's dismay, and Buczynski soon rose to a second degree position, adopting an adapted craft name of "Hermes Dionysos" and becoming High Priest of Thompson's coven. Thompson ultimately became attracted to the young man, and repeatedly asked him to have sex with her, to which he refused. Their friendship broke down, and he was expelled from her North Haven coven, within a few months of having joined it, later in 1972.

=== Welsh Traditionalist Witchcraft: 1972–1973 ===
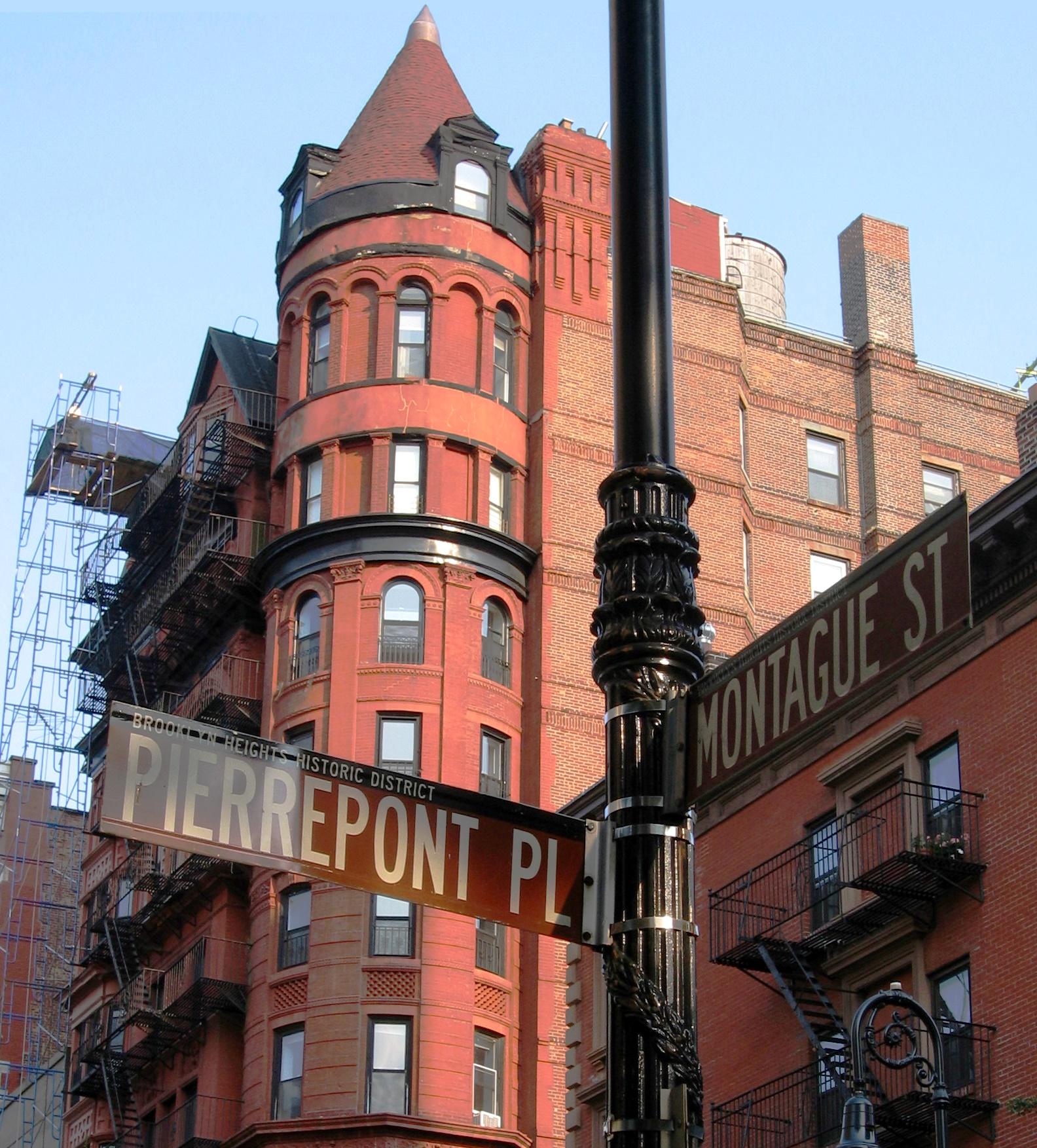
The Brooklyn Heights area of New York City, from where Buczynski ran his coven.

After having left Gwen Thompson's sect, Buczynski decided to form his own sect of Wicca in October 1972, which he named "Welsh Traditionalist Witchcraft" or "The Traditionalist Gwyddoniaid". Buczynski formed that sect out of the structure of Gardnerian Wicca, with the new sect's book of shadows being largely based upon that which he had obtained through his work with Gwen Thompson, accompanied by sections taken from the recently published Lady Sheba's The Book of Shadows. Onto that, Buczynski added influences by the Welsh mythology contained in texts like The Mabinogion and the Arthurian legends, which fascinated him, despite his lack of Welsh heritage. However, Buczynski had spuriously claimed that his sect actually dated back to the palaeolithic era, and was transmitted to him by a figure whose anonymity he had to protect. Later in 1972, Buczynski created an outer court, through which to teach interested persons who were not yet initiated.

Notably, Buczynski welcomed LGBT people and non-Caucasians into his sect, at a time when they were denied entry into most other Wiccan covens. Although taking an open attitude to spiritual seekers, Buczynski prevented the occult investigator, Hans Holzer, from entering the outer coven when the latter requested admission to undertake research for his book The Witchcraft Report. Like many people in the pagan and occult community, Buczynski was wary of Holzer's intentions and the sensationalist claims that he purported in his publications.

A number of teenagers who were interested in Wicca had begun hanging around at the Warlock Shop, and they too were initiated into The Traditionalist Gwyddoniaid, after gaining parental permission. Proceeding through the outer court of Buczynski's coven, they eventually hived off to form their own coven, called "The Children of Branwen", in December 1972, with prominent members including Robert Carey, Denny Sargent, and Karen and Eddie Chiecho. Buczynski initially attended some of the group's meetings, in order to instruct these students in witchcraft, but soon found his time preoccupied with his own primary coven, leaving the coven under the control of high priestess Kay Smith. She would subsequently go on to found a Welsh Traditionalist coven for adults, leaving the position of high priestess to Melda Tamarack.

Through their work at The Warlock Shop, Buczynski and Slater came to meet and befriend Judith and Thomas Kneital (also known by their craft names of Theos and Phoenix), who had recently taken control of the Long Island coven of gardnerians in New York after the former high priest and high priestess– Raymond Buckland and his wife Rosemary, had decided to divorce. In early 1973, the shop had financial difficulty, and the Kneitals personally lent several thousand dollars to Slater and Buczynski in order to help them out, which Buczynski promptly paid back. Their business quickly recovered, and they employed a young man from New Orleans named Robert Carey to work in the shop. Robert was a close personal friend of Candy Darling, and used to visit The Factory, where he was known as "Chanel 13". The increasing relationship between Slater and Buczynski and the Kneitals led to socializing between their two covens. Despite their differing class backgrounds (the Gardnerian Commack coven being largely middle class, and the Welsh Traditionalist Brooklyn Heights coven being largely working class and counter-cultural), they got on well. In February 1973, Buczynski requested initiation into the Gardnerican craft from the Kneitals, but they refused, being cautious of what uses he would put the Gardnerian liturgy to.

Still friends with Martello, Buczynski initiated him up to the third degree of his Welsh Traditionalist sect, and in return, he received third-degree initiation in Strega. At the same time, he was facing problems within his own sect, because one couple running their own Welsh outer coven, namely Claudia and Gerard Nero, had decided to abandon Buczynski's sect and receive initiation into Gardnerianism from the Kneitals; they had ultimately decided to do so after becoming increasingly sceptical of Buczynski's spurious claim of palaeolithic roots. They took their initiates, including Margot Adler, with them, much to Buczynski and Slater's annoyance, leading to a breakdown of the friendship that they had had with the Kneitals. Buczynski's sect nevertheless continued to grow and spread, and in January 1973, the sect joined the Council of Earth Religions (COER)– a pan-pagan umbrella organization that was founded in the previous year, for the purpose of working for the common defence of the movement. Buczynski's primary inner coven grew to such a size that it had to divide into two covens at Midsummer of 1973. Buczynski's high priestess– Kay Smith, decided to take lead of one of the covens, while Eddie remained in the other, being joined by a new ritual consort named Judith. By August 1973, there were two outer-court covens of the Welsh sect in New York City, and one each in Philadelphia and in Hopewell, Virginia.

=== Gardnerian Wicca: 1973–1974 ===
After the Kneitals had rejected his request for initiation into Gardnerian Wicca, Buczynski met with another Gardnerian high priestess, Patricia Siero, who instead agreed to initiate both him and Slater. Siero herself had been initiated by Fran Fisher, high priestess of a coven located in Louisville, Kentucky, in June 1973, who in turn had claimed initiation from Rosemary Buckland. The weekend after returning from Kentucky, Siero initiated Buczynski and Slater through all three degrees of the Gardnerian sect, entitling them to operate as high priests of their own covens. Buczynski decided to do so, founding his own Gardnerian coven with an older German woman named Renate Springer as high priestess that operated in the Brooklyn Heights area. Nevertheless, the Kneitals refused to accept Buczynski's Gardnerian credentials, asserting that Rosemary Buckland had never actually initiated Fran Fischer up to the third degree. As a result of the Kneitals' claims, the Gardnerian community in the Northeastern United States widely refused to accept the Brooklyn Heights coven as legitimate, and Siero decided to take up the Kneitals' offer for re-initiation; as a result, she disowned the initiations of Buczynski and Slater which she had carried out. Springer was uneasy at the situation, and decided to depose Buczynski from his position as high priest, replacing him with one of her initiates, Gilbert Littlebear.

Despite the internal "witch wars" that Buczynski had become involved in, he continued to propagate information on Wicca and paganism in the media, giving talks for a group known as "The Friends of the Craft", which had been co-founded by Slater, and helping to organize the "OCCULT" exhibit which was held at the Museum of American Folk Art. Activity also continued at The Warlock Shop, and in December he and Slater published the first issue of a pagan newsletter called Earth Religion News, which would run for several years. They would subsequently publish a short book about Wicca that Buczynski had authored, entitled the Witchcraft Fact Book. Both he and Slater also befriended Raymond Buckland, the prominent English wiccan who was credited with introducing Gardnerian Wicca to the United States; at the time, Buckland had ceased to operate in that wiccan sect, and was in the process of developing Seax-Wica, a wiccan sect that is inspired by the medieval religion of Anglo-Saxon paganism, which both Buczynski and Slater approved of despite opposition from the Kneitals.

His interest in Gardnerianism was however maintained, and in December 1973, he founded a second Gardnerian coven, and invited Jane Cicciotto, then working as the Warlock Shop's book keeper, to take up the mantle as its high priestess. Meeting at Jane's apartment in Brooklyn, which she shared with her husband Burt, Buczynski continued to maintain his own legitimacy within the sect despite Siero's denunciation of his original initiation. Making various alterations to the established liturgy in the Book of Shadows and increasing coven democracy, he recognized that these changes meant that the coven was more Neo-Gardnerian than orthodox Gardnerian, and as such, he decided to proclaim that the coven adhered to no specific sect, instead referring to it simply as "The Wica". Trouble hit the coven when Burt Cicciotto, a recovering heroin addict, proceeded to steal $3000 from the Warlock Shop, and disappeared. Embarrassed, Jane stood down as The Wica's high priestess, with leadership of the group falling to another married couple– Ria and David Farnham, who moved the covenstead to their home in the Bronx, resulting in a lengthy commute for most of the coven members. Buczynski and Slater ceased their active involvement with the group, which had dissolved by June 1974.

=== Church of the Eternal Source and the Huntington Coven: 1974–1975 ===
In 1974, Buczynski got in contact with Harold Moss– the founder of the Church of the Eternal Source (CES)– a kemetic pagan group which he had created in 1970. Fascinated by the religion of Ancient Egypt which the CES wanted to revive, Buczynski joined the order, being ordained as a priest on July 19, 1974. Adopting the ritual name of "Un-Nefer", he devoted himself to the worship of the goddess Isis, organizing a temple based in New York, and beginning the publication of a newsletter, which he titled Esbat. Buczynski's relationship with Moss, and with the CES' secretary Ron Myron, was however strained. Although Moss was himself a homosexual, he disliked Buczynski's effeminate nature, while Myron had taken a dislike to Buczynski as soon as the latter had been ordained, in particular believing that he didn't spend enough time responding to enquiries.

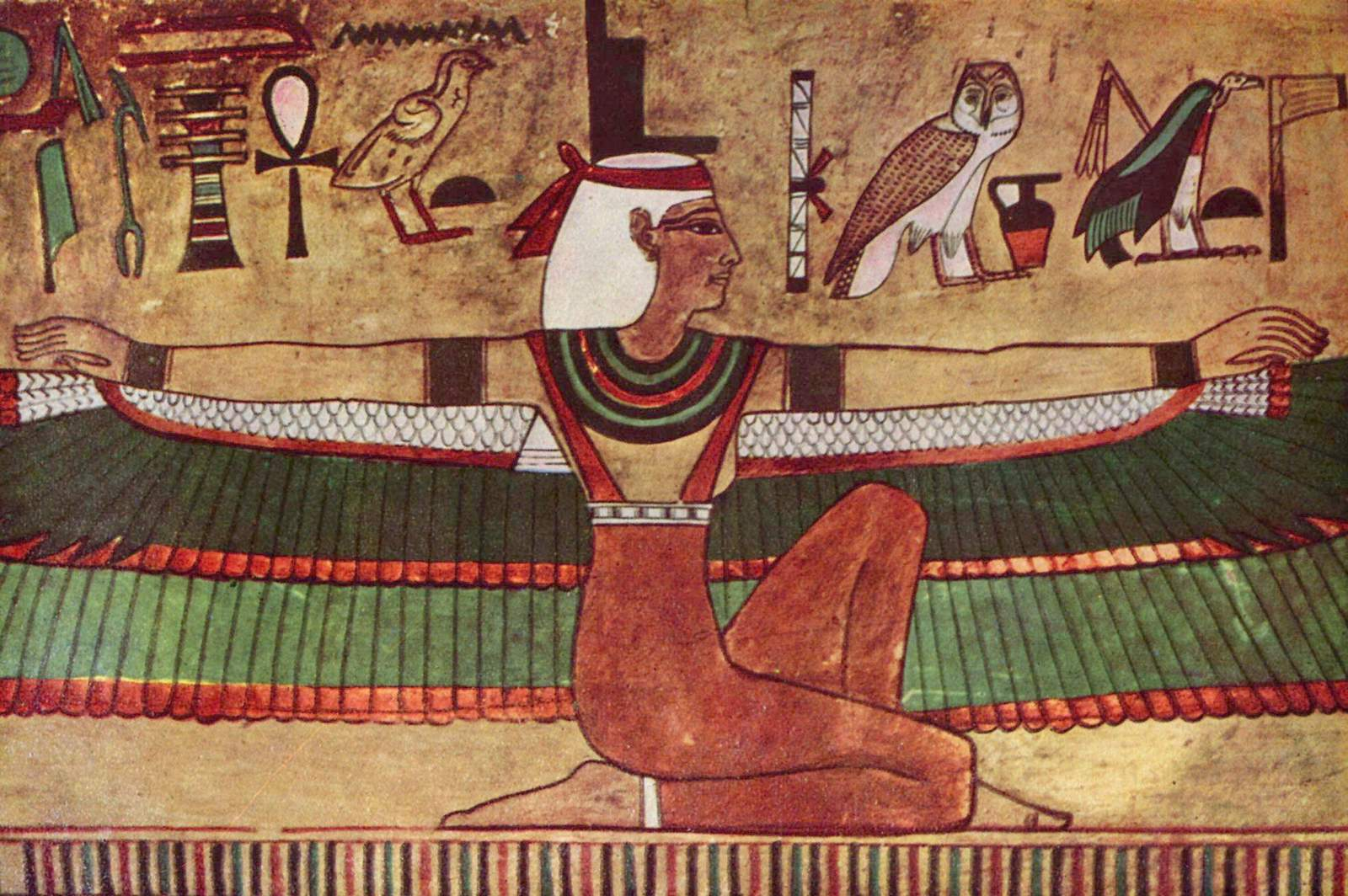
The goddess Isis, wall painting, c. 1360 BCE.

Problems had also arisen in Buczynski's relationship with Slater. Living and working together at the same premises, they had begun to argue regularly, and had both been taking part in sexual activity with other men, particularly in the gay bathhouses which could then be found in New York. By the summer of 1974 they had broken up, and although they briefly remained roommates, Buczynski soon collected together his belongings and moved back in with his mother and step-father in Ozone Park, where he converted the basement into a bedroom for himself. No longer working at The Warlock Shop, he found himself broke and isolated from the city's occult community, ultimately ceasing active coven work by September 1974. Eventually, he obtained a part-time job at the BookMasters bookstore at 1482 Broadway in Times Square, and it was while commuting home on the subway one night that he met Bennie Geraci (1950–), a native of New Orleans who had moved to the city. Buczynski and Geraci soon entered into a relationship, with the former moving into the latter's small rented flat in Rego Park, Queens, which was shared with four other men. In January 1975, he lost his job due to the economic recession, but was able to secure a job as an office boy at J. Aron and Company, a commodities trading corporation based in Wall Street.

Buczynski's continuing disagreements with senior members of the CES led him to resign from the priesthood on August 1, 1975. The New York Temple that he had led subsequently folded. Returning his interest to Wicca, he befriended a Gardnerian high priestess named Sheila Saperton, who had been initiated into Wicca years before by Raymond Buckland. Saperton had become increasingly interested in Buckland's newly developed sect called Seax-Wica, and founded a Seax coven from her home in Huntington Station on Long Island. Although Buczynski was never initiated into Seax-Wica, he associated with the group, and attended many of their rites. Eventually however, the group tired of the practices of Seax-Wica, and instead transformed into a Gardnerian coven, with Buczynski becoming its high priest. Claiming that a mysterious witch known only as Jana, who had been involved in the New Forest coven back in Hampshire, England, had been communicating with him and providing him with a legitimate lineage, he began making further changes to the coven structure. Both Buczynski biographer Michael Lloyd and researcher Philip Heselton have expressed doubt that Jana was ever a real figure operating in England, instead suggesting that she was perhaps an invention of Buczynski's to legitimize his practice of Gardnerian Wica.

Buczynski welcomed a number of friends and flatmates, including Benny Geraci, into the Huntington coven, and later stated his desire to personally initiate Geraci up to the third degree; Sheila Saperton disagreed, citing the traditional Gardnerian prohibition upon anyone initiating a member of the same sex. Buczynski said that her attitude was homophobic, and he subsequently abandoned both her and Gardnerian Wicca. Meanwhile, Buczynski and Geraci moved out of their crowded apartment into a new flat in Middle Village. Despite same-sex marriage not being legally recognized at that time, Eddie and Benny undertook a private wedding ceremony to marry one another, although they were non-monogamous, and would go together to gay bath-houses to partake in sexual activity with other patrons, resulting in Buczynski's contraction of several sexually transmitted infections.

=== The Minoan Brotherhood: 1975–1979 ===
"Finally, sick of all the shit flying back and forth from coven to coven (mainly concerning me), along with threats, death curses, slander etc., I decided that, in order to find fulfillment in my religious beliefs, I must find a pagan cult which would welcome me as I am – a proud gay man. I began to research ancient religions involving the worship of the Mother Goddess ... All I needed now was to find a place in which I could function openly and freely as myself. Most of the pagan Mother Goddess cults of antiquity were overtly tolerant of homosexuals; most had a homosexual priesthood. But none seemed quite right. I continued my search. In 1973, I discovered the answer on an island in the Mediterranean: Crete."

— Eddie Buczynski, 1977.

Buczynski had become increasingly dissatisfied with Gardnerian Wicca and other forms of contemporary paganism, which he said treated homosexual and bisexual individuals as inferior to their heterosexual counterparts. He was perturbed that while many covens and other groups did allow gay and bi men and women to join, they were required to work in a ritual framework that was explicitly heterosexual. He argued that this was inconsistent with the fact that a number of pre-Christian societies in Europe and the Middle East had cults containing an exclusively homosexual priesthood. He was particularly interested in such cults that were found in the Minoan civilization of bronze-age Crete, and began to voraciously read books on the subject. He would later place many of these texts on the required reading list for new initiates, including among them academic works of history and archaeology like Arthur Evans' The Palace of Minos, Martin P. Nilsson's A History of Greek Religion and George E. Mylonas' Eleusis and the Eleusinian Mysteries, books on mythology such as Robert Graves' The White Goddess, fictional novels like Mary Renault's The Bull from the Sea and Thomas Burnett Swann's How Are the Mighty Fallen, and such works on occultism as Gerald Gardner's Witchcraft Today.

Explicitly founded as a "mystery/initiatory cult which erotically celebrates life through male love", Buczynski's Minoan sect took the rituals of Gardnerian Wicca as its basis, but adapted them, with a new liturgy being written by him and placed within a ritual text which he named "The Book of the Mysteries", which is a renamed wiccan book of shadows. Buczynski adopted the eight annual Gardnerian sabbat festivals, but associated them with ancient mediterranean religious festivals. Buczynski insisted that even though his coven would contain only men, it should still embrace gender polarity. He therefore established the Cretan snake-goddess Rhea as the sect's primary deity, and established Rhea's son– the Cretan bull-god, as the male god, so that the sect was duotheistic in nature, like most other wiccan sects.

The Minoan Brotherhood was officially inaugurated on January 1, 1977. Naming this first group "the Knossos Grove coven", it initially began at his and Geraci's shared flat, where they were joined by their friend Joseph Cupolo. Setting up a lineage recording system to take into account which new initiates were being brought into the Brotherhood, the first man to be welcomed in was Kim Schuller, who was soon followed by Bruce-Michael Gelbert. Not long after, Cupolo moved to New Orleans, where he founded a second coven, known as Phaistos Grove. In 1977, Buczynski began attending the Sheridan Square Gym, and it was here that he met Gene Muto the following year. A stage director and part-time bartender, Muto entered into a sexual relationship with Buczynski, which Geraci accepted as per the rules of their open relationship. However, when Buczynski announced that he had fallen in love with Muto, it marked the end of his relationship with Geraci, who decided to move back to New Orleans in February 1979. Muto proceeded to move in with Buczynski at his apartment on West 13th Street, but did not share his boyfriend's magico-religious beliefs, instead being a far left atheist. Muto thought that Buczynski was wasting his life on witchcraft, and encouraged him to aim for an academic education; Buczynski therefore proceeded to attain a graduate equivalency diploma (GED). The Knossos Grove had meanwhile begun to deteriorate, rarely meeting from late-1978 through early 1979. He did however bring in Tony Fiara in late 1979, who would go on to play a significant role in the Minoan sect, which was then being eclipsed in size by the Radical Faerie movement. That year, Buczynski decided to stop using his flat as a covenstead, which he moved to the Earth Star Temple, the back room of The Magickal Childe, Herman Slater's new shop.

=== Entering academia: 1980–1988 ===
In 1980, Buczynski and Muto went on a package holiday to Greece, further inspiring the former's interests in the region's ancient cultures. Deciding to explore this topic further, he enrolled to study for an undergraduate degree in Classics and Ancient History at Hunter College, a part of the City University of New York (CUNY) located in Manhattan's Upper East Side, beginning there in September 1980. At the university, he became friends with one of his mentors, the classical archaeologist Clairève Grandjouan, and was saddened by her death before he had completed the course. He devoted himself to his studies, which he greatly enjoyed, and was sufficiently successful to be placed on the Thomas Hunter Honors Program. In June 1982, he returned to Greece in order to take part in his first archaeological excavations, which were run by the American School of Classical Studies at Athens (ASCSA). Returning to New York City, he began to take all of the modules that he could which were devoted to field archaeology, considering a potential career in the profession. In the winter break between 1982 and 1983, he once more returned to the Mediterranean, touring Greece and Italy with Muto. He would subsequently be laid off from his job, but gained work in the Hunter College Classics Office. His increased interest in academic archaeology came at the expense of his involvement in the occult, and in the Spring of 1981 he stepped down from his leadership of the Knossos Grove coven, handing control over to Tony Fiara. As his studies at Hunter College came to an end, he decided to continue his education to a postgraduate level, and successfully obtained a scholarship from the Andrew W. Mellon Foundation.

He chose Bryn Mawr College in Bryn Mawr, Pennsylvania, a socially liberal, gay-friendly institution founded on Quaker principles. There, he enrolled in the Department of Classical and Near Eastern Archaeology and began work on attaining his master's degree. He moved into the Thornbrook Manor apartments on Montgomery Avenue with his cats Maybelle and Grimalkin, renting a flat that was larger than that in which he and Muto had lived in New York. At Bryn Mawr, he worked hard, and was a popular student among both staff and pupils. His dissertation was on the role of marine objects within Minoan culture. He and Muto met when they could, going on holiday together to Egypt and Israel in the winter of 1985. In August 1986, Muto got a job in Atlanta, Georgia, so they gave up the New York apartment. Buczynski attempted to start a coven of Minoan practitioners at Bryn Mawr, but the only response he received was from a man named Kevin Moscrip, who he initiated in the spring of 1986. However, he decided to put a stop to Moscrip's training when he began to become concerned by the HIV/AIDS epidemic that was then sweeping through the Minoan sect and the country's wider gay community. In the winter of 1986, he and Muto traveled to Colombia, where they visited Cartagena, but in the following March, Buczynski took ill, and though some of his friends suspected that he might be exhibiting symptoms of AIDS, he refused to get tested. That summer, he and Muto went for a vacation in Cape Cod, before he submitted his dissertation in September 1987.

In November, Buczynski was taken seriously ill with pneumonia and required hospitalization. It was there that the doctors diagnosed him with the HIV, acquired at some point during the 1970s. After he was discharged, his mother and step-father came to visit and help care for him. He spent Christmas that year on Crete with Muto, before his studies at Bryn Mawr came to an end in 1988. He was awarded his degree on May 15, after which Muto whisked him off for a holiday in Cancún, Mexico.

=== Final months: 1989 ===
Although he had wanted to study for a doctorate and proceed with a career in archaeology, Buczynski was dying. He became ill with the Toxoplasma gondii parasite, which took advantage of his weakened immune system. He suffered partial paralysis on his right side as well as brain lesions, leaving him irritable and withdrawn, and required hospitalization. Upon release, he moved to Atlanta to be with Muto in January 1989. By this stage, he was unable to attend to basic tasks on his own, including eating and dressing himself, and required almost constant care, from both Muto and from carers based at St. Joseph Hospital. He began to talk with the hospital's Roman Catholic priest and finally decided to return to the faith of his birth, undertaking his confession of reconciliation in February. In March, his condition deteriorated, and he was admitted to the hospital, where he fell into a coma and died on the morning on Thursday, March 16.

== Personal life ==
Buczynski could be hot tempered, with Lloyd describing him as "street-smart, intelligent, opinionated, flamboyant, charismatic, driven, and ... often governed by mercurial emotions. He could be fiery, and he had a vicious temper when someone angered him, which admittedly was not easy to accomplish."

== Legacy ==
Following Buczynski's death, Lady Rhea asserted that anyone who was initiated through one of Buczynski's groups could refer to themself as an "Edwardian" wiccan in his honor. Buczynski would come to be declared one of the "saints of Antinous" by a pagan group based in Hollywood, California, known as the Temple of Antinous.

Asphodel Press published the 2012 biography Bull of Heaven: The Mythic Life of Eddie Buczynski and the Rise of the New York Pagan by Michael Lloyd, with a foreword by Margot Adler. The book's launch party was held at Sala One-Nine, a tapas restaurant at 35 West 19th Street in Manhattan, which stood on the site of Slater's Magickal Childe store. The New York Times reported that a "strapping man" dressed in a headdress and loincloth worked at the door, with around 80 attendees inside, most of which were pagans. Among them were Bennie Geraci, Carol Bulzone, Kaye Flagg, and Margot Adler, a number of which gave speeches before a memorial service to Buczynski was held.

Bull of Heaven was positively reviewed by pagan studies scholar Ethan Doyle White in The Pomegranate academic journal, who asserted that the book was "eloquently and engagingly written", and was important for documenting the life not only of Buczynski, but also of other important figures in the New York pagan scene, like Herman Slater and Leo Martello. He praised Lloyd's research as "thorough and far-reaching", but was critical of the poor quality of the images. Noting that the book's scope would invite comparison with Chas S. Clifton's Her Hidden Children and Adler's Drawing Down the Moon, he labelled it a "must read" for those interested in the history of American paganism and gay liberation, summing it up as "the finest independent pagan studies scholarship to have been produced in the United States to date." Elsewhere, he characterized the book as "first-rate".
