= Herman Slater =

American Wiccan priest & publisher (1938–1992)

Herman Slater (1938 – July 9, 1992) was an American Wiccan high priest and occult bookstore proprietor and an editor, publisher, and author. He died of AIDS in 1992.

== Early life ==
Slater was born in 1938 in a lower-middle-class Jewish neighborhood of New York City. Slater studied business administration at New York University, liberal arts at Hunter College and traffic management at the Traffic Management Institute in New York. He also completed a full course at the United States Navy Personnel School at United States Naval Training Center Bainbridge. From 1958 through 1969, Slater had several jobs in management, traffic expediting, and insurance claims investigation. 1969 marked the beginning of significant health related issues for him. He was later forced to quit work due to bone tuberculosis, which cost him a hip bone and three years for recuperation.

== Career ==
Slater and Eddie Buczynski opened The Warlock Shoppe, the oldest witchcraft bookshop in Brooklyn, New York. Buczynski was the more magical and spiritual of the two and left the business side to Slater, who helped the shop, named as Magickal Childe, grow in profitability. The shop established itself as the central information hub for local witches and the newly emerging neopagan communities. The two also published a periodical called Earth Religion News. It was successful but also caused controversy due to its explicit contents and cover designs. In 1974, Slater was initiated into the Gardnerian tradition and assumed leadership of a coven in the late 1970s.

In 1972, Slater presented the "Inquisitional Bigot of the Year" award to NBC during a guest appearance on the Today show, criticizing an episode of McMillan & Wife that equated witchcraft with devil-worship. The crew of Today physically removed him from the set. More controversy surrounding Slater's actual proficiency in the types of magick he claimed to practice, accusations that he plagiarized material, his abuse of dissatisfied customers of the Magickal Childe, and outrage over other behaviors he exhibited earned him the nickname "Horrible Herman".

Slater frequently lectured as a guest speaker at many colleges. He also appeared with his familiar companion, a snake named Herman. He also hosted a weekly cable show which aired in Manhattan, called The Magickal Mystery Tour. The show featured interviews, rituals, music, occultism, and magick instruction. He thought of the show as an Earth religion 700 Club because it spread the word on the Old Religion and asked for donations.

== Works ==
Slater wrote the books:

- Introduction to Witchcraft, ISBN 978-0-939708-16-1,
- The Hoodoo Bible,ISBN 978-0-939708-06-2
- A Book of Pagan Rituals I & II,ISBN 978-0-87728-348-5
- Pagan Rituals III, ISBN 978-0-939708-27-7

Published:

- Earth Religion News magazine

Edited:

- The Magickal Formulary Spellbook, ISBN 978-0939708000,
- The Magickal Formulary Spellbook II, ISBN 978-0939708109

These two witchcraft cookbooks are based on the inner workings of his shop and formulas of his potions. They are sold worldwide and are well-respected within the witchcraft community. The Magickal Childe now continues with an Internet presence.

== Sources ==
Footnotes

Bibliography

- Guiley, Rosemary Ellen, ed. (2008). "Slater, Herman (1938–1992)". The Encyclopedia of Witches, Witchcraft, & Wicca (3rd ed.). Facts on File Inc. ISBN 978-0-8160-7104-3.
