= Lady Gwen Thompson =

American poet

Lady Gwen Thompson (September 16, 1928 – May 22, 1986) was the pseudonym of Phyllis Thompson, author and teacher of traditionalist initiatory witchcraft through her own organisation, the New England Covens of Traditionalist Witches.

Thompson said that she was a hereditary witch, with connections to the Salem witch trials of 1692, though she could not provide original sources to support these assertions. When she published a supposedly ancient poem called The Rede of the Wiccae, it was believed by some to be partly her own work.

== Family ==
Phyllis Thompson (née Healy) claimed to be a hereditary witch from New England. She was best known by the pseudonym (or public Craft name) of Lady Gwen Thompson, though she changed the forename to Gwynne in the 1980s. Thompson was her final married surname.

According to Thompson, her grandmother Adriana Porter's family were the carriers of a secret tradition of folk witchcraft that had come down through Sarah Arnot Cook and Wealthy Trask (Trash) from the latter's seventeenth-century ancestors. Porter had initiated her and her mother into the family's tradition and given them their "Craft Names".

At first Thompson intended to keep the tradition within her family, subsequently initiating her children and grandchildren into them. However, her son and his family left the family tradition, joining the Christian religion and raising their children within it, and her daughter had no children. Fearing that her traditions would be completely lost, she began "fostering" outsiders into it as family members; she began initiating them in the late 1960s.

By 1970 she had informally created the organization now known as the New England Covens of Traditionalist Witches (N.E.C.T.W.) (currently listed in the State of Rhode Island as a subsidiary of Society of the Evening Star). Around 1974 Thompson retired from leading the N.E.C.T.W. and turned it over to two of its early members; the leadership has undergone several changes in the intervening years.

Thompson's claims to be an hereditary witch have little independent support, since she states that she destroyed the original version of her grandmother's lore-book after copying its contents, and recopied her own book several times throughout her lifetime. While a recent book by Robert Mathiesen and Theitic documents a long history of occultism within Thompson's ancestry, including the seventeenth-century alchemist Jonathan Brewster, as well as several of the families on both sides of the Salem witch trials of 1692, there is no direct evidence of the veracity of Thompson's claims as she, her mother and any others who could have provided first-hand information are all deceased, and any written documentation has not been made public.

== The Rede of the Wiccae ==
In 1975, Thompson had an article entitled "Wiccan-Pagan Potpourri" published in Green Egg magazine issue #69 (Ostara 1975), for which she is best known. A portion of that article included a poem consisting of 26 rhyming couplets entitled The Rede of the Wiccae, stating that

"... Our own particular form of the Wiccan Rede is that which was passed on to her heirs by Adriana Porter, who was well into her nineties when she crossed over into the Summerland in the year 1946. ...".

Although Thompson wrote that this version of the Rede was in its original form, this declaration is disputed for several reasons, but primarily as the language of the poem refers to Wiccan concepts that are not known to have existed in her grandmother's lifetime. It is sometimes ascribed to Thompson herself. Mathiesen and Theitic concluded that 18 to 20 of the verses are lore which would be common to the area of rural 17th to 19th century New England and compiled by the hand of someone who would have been born no later that the late 19th century, and that at least six of the verses which are deemed “The Wiccan Verses” were compiled and added by a second and later hand. Since Thompson was dispensing these 26 as a whole from around 1969 it is a reasonable assumption that hers was that second hand. Another claim is that it is adapted from a speech given by Doreen Valiente at a dinner sponsored by the Witchcraft Research Association and mentioned in volume one (1964) of the Pentagram, a United Kingdom pagan newsletter then being published. Valiente did publish a similarly worded and entitled poem The Witches Creed in her 1978 book, "Witchcraft for Tomorrow".

== Celtic Traditionalist Wicca ==
The Green Egg publication listed her by-line as "Lady Gwen Thompson, Welsh Tradition Wicca", which was a tag of their own creation. This sparked a protest by Thompson in issue #71 with a subsequent letter from her and an apology from then-editor Oberon Zell-Ravenheart (then known as Tim Zell) in issue #72.

Thompson stated in her opening letter

"... For the record, we are not Welsh. I do believe we ran this route a few years ago, and it seems that once more clarification is needed. We are and always have been simply Traditionalist. We use the term Celtic Traditionalist to differentiate us from the ones who claim to be Welsh, and I know of only one tradition that has the right to use that name. If there are others, I do not know of them. My apologies, but we are not Welsh. We prefer to be simply known as "Traditionalists. ..."

While Thompson maintained the use of the term Witch and Witchcraft in her teachings and writings, by this time the term Wicca was becoming more fashionable to use in place of Witch/Witchcraft, as being a "less-charged" word. This has led to numerous instances of Thompson's Tradition and its practitioners being labeled as Celtic Wicca despite her stated objections and preference for the term Traditionalist.

== Later life ==
Thompson remained active in teaching her form of witchcraft into the 1980s, carrying on an extensive, worldwide correspondence. Through her letters and teachings she contributed to the development of other traditions, including the Keepers of the Ancient Mysteries, the Georgian Tradition and others. Her own tradition of the N.E.C.T.W. developed offshoots as well, including the and the Groves of the Tuatha de Danaan and others; these offshoots are not recognized as an actual part of the N.E.C.T.W. although their historical connections to it are acknowledged.

In the mid-1980s, Thompson was diagnosed with cancer, and subsequently died May 22, 1986, while on a visit to Nova Scotia, Canada.^{6}

Many of Thompson's Craft artifacts, including her personal book, are in the possession of the N.E.C.T.W., having been given them by her daughter, mother and other family members.^{6}

== See also ==
- The Wiccan Rede
