= National Register of Historic Places listings in Kalamazoo County, Michigan =

Map of Michigan with Kalamazoo County highlighted

The following is a list of Registered Historic Places in Kalamazoo County, Michigan.
This National Park Service list is complete through NPS recent listings posted May 15, 2026.

	Name on the Register	Image	Date listed	Location	City or town	Description
1	The Acres	The Acres	May 19, 2004 (#04000458)	10036, 10069, 11090, 11108 and 11185 Hawthorne Dr. 42°15′42″N 85°24′32″W	Charleston Township	
2	Peter B. Appeldorn House	Peter B. Appeldorn House	May 27, 1983 (#83000854)	532 Village St. 42°16′59″N 85°35′30″W	Kalamazoo	
3	Booth-Dunham Estate	Booth-Dunham Estate	April 1, 1998 (#98000271)	6059 S. Ninth St. 42°13′45″N 85°40′37″W	Texas Charter Township	
4	Bronson Park Historic District	Bronson Park Historic District	May 27, 1983 (#83000855)	Roughly bounded by S. Rose, S. Park, W. Lovell, and W. Michigan Aves. 42°17′24″N 85°35′10″W	Kalamazoo	
5	Eric and Margaret Ann (Davis) Brown House	Eric and Margaret Ann (Davis) Brown House	April 26, 2016 (#16000200)	2806 Taliesin Dr. 42°15′48″N 85°37′58″W	Kalamazoo	
6	Isaac Brown House	Isaac Brown House	May 27, 1983 (#83000856)	427 S. Burdick St. 42°17′17″N 85°34′58″W	Kalamazoo	
7	Climax Post Office Building	Climax Post Office Building	January 27, 1999 (#99000053)	107 N. Main St. 42°14′19″N 85°20′10″W	Climax	
8	William S. Delano House	William S. Delano House	August 9, 1979 (#79001157)	N of Kalamazoo at 555 W. E Ave. 42°21′42″N 85°35′51″W	Kalamazoo	
9	Desenberg Building	Desenberg Building	August 13, 1979 (#79001158)	251 E. Michigan Ave. 42°17′33″N 85°34′51″W	Kalamazoo	
10	Benjamin and Maria (Ogden) Drake Farm	Benjamin and Maria (Ogden) Drake Farm	December 12, 2012 (#12001031)	927 N. Drake Rd. 42°18′03″N 85°39′12″W	Kalamazoo	
11	Engine House No. 3	Engine House No. 3	May 27, 1983 (#83000857)	607 Charlotte Ave. 42°17′51″N 85°33′52″W	Kalamazoo	Note NRIS erroneously tags this as a delisted property, confusing it with The Harriett (refnum 83000057).
12	Fanckboner-Nichols Farmstead	Fanckboner-Nichols Farmstead	May 2, 2007 (#07000387)	5992 West VW Ave. 42°07′18″N 85°39′55″W	Prairie Ronde Township	
13	John Gibbs House	John Gibbs House	May 27, 1983 (#83000858)	3403 Parkview Ave. 42°15′35″N 85°38′25″W	Kalamazoo	
14	Gibson, Inc. Factory and Office Building	Gibson, Inc. Factory and Office Building	April 29, 2022 (#100007673)	225 Parsons St. 42°18′04″N 85°34′51″W	Kalamazoo	
15	Henry Gilbert House	Henry Gilbert House	May 27, 1983 (#83000859)	415 W. Lovell; 42°17′19″N 85°35′16″W	Kalamazoo	
16	Richard and Mary Woodward Gregory House	Richard and Mary Woodward Gregory House	June 20, 2002 (#02000666)	913 E. Augusta Rd. 42°20′35″N 85°20′38″W	Augusta	
17	Haymarket Historic District	Haymarket Historic District	May 27, 1983 (#83000860)	Michigan Ave. between Portage St. and the Grand Rapids and Indiana railroad line; also 105-141 E. Michigan Ave. 42°17′33″N 85°34′49″W	Kalamazoo	Second set of addresses represents a boundary increase of May 4, 2011
18	Henderson Park-West Main Hill Historic District	Henderson Park-West Main Hill Historic District	July 21, 1995 (#95000871)	Roughly bounded by W. Main, Thompson, Academy, Monroe, W. Lovell and Valley Sts. and Prairie Ave. 42°17′29″N 85°36′21″W	Kalamazoo	
19	Illinois Envelope Co. Building	Illinois Envelope Co. Building	May 27, 1983 (#83000861)	400 Bryant St. 42°16′19″N 85°34′40″W	Kalamazoo	
20	Kalamazoo State Hospital Water Tower	Kalamazoo State Hospital Water Tower	March 16, 1972 (#72000624)	Oakland Dr. 42°16′37″N 85°36′28″W	Kalamazoo	
21	Silas W. Kendall House	Silas W. Kendall House	December 28, 1990 (#90001958)	7540 Stadium Dr., Oshtemo Township; 42°15′19″N 85°41′52″W	Kalamazoo	
22	Ladies Library Association Building	Ladies Library Association Building	July 8, 1970 (#70000274)	333 S. Park St. 42°17′20″N 85°35′13″W	Kalamazoo	
23	Lawrence and Chapin Building	Lawrence and Chapin Building	May 27, 1983 (#83000862)	201 N. Rose St. 42°17′34″N 85°35′07″W	Kalamazoo	
24	Lee Paper Company Mill Complex	Lee Paper Company Mill Complex	August 11, 2016 (#16000524)	300 W. Highway St. 42°06′51″N 85°32′16″W	Vicksburg	
25	David Lilienfeld House	David Lilienfeld House	January 23, 1986 (#86000119)	447 W. South St. 42°17′22″N 85°35′18″W	Kalamazoo	
26	The Marlborough	The Marlborough	May 27, 1983 (#83000863)	471 W. South St. 42°17′22″N 85°35′21″W	Kalamazoo	
27	Masonic Temple Building	Masonic Temple Building	May 12, 1980 (#80001876)	309 N. Rose St. 42°17′38″N 85°35′06″W	Kalamazoo	
28	Michigan Central Depot	Michigan Central Depot	June 11, 1975 (#75000949)	459 N. Burdick St. 42°17′44″N 85°35′03″W	Kalamazoo	
29	Henry Montague House	Henry Montague House	May 27, 1983 (#83000864)	814 Oakland Dr. 42°17′01″N 85°35′55″W	Kalamazoo	
30	The Oaklands	The Oaklands	May 27, 1983 (#83000865)	1815 W. Michigan Ave. 42°17′01″N 85°36′41″W	Kalamazoo	
31	Old Central High School	Old Central High School	August 16, 1983 (#83000866)	714 S. Westnedge Ave. 42°17′05″N 85°35′26″W	Kalamazoo	
32	Old Fire House No. 4	Old Fire House No. 4	May 27, 1983 (#83000867)	526 N. Burdick St. 42°17′50″N 85°34′59″W	Kalamazoo	
33	Oshtemo Town Hall	Oshtemo Town Hall	May 19, 2004 (#04000459)	10 S. Eighth St. 42°17′19″N 85°41′15″W	Oshtemo Charter Township	
34	Parkwyn Village	Parkwyn Village	April 29, 2022 (#100007690)	Winchell and Lorraine Aves.; Parkwyn and Taliesin Drs. 42°15′51″N 85°37′51″W	Kalamazoo	
35	Portage Street Fire Station	Portage Street Fire Station	September 12, 1985 (#85002150)	1249 Portage St. 42°16′46″N 85°34′12″W	Kalamazoo	
36	Alonzo T. Prentice House	Alonzo T. Prentice House	May 27, 1983 (#83000868)	839 W. Lovell St. 42°17′19″N 85°35′42″W	Kalamazoo	
37	Richland Historic District	Richland Historic District	April 11, 1997 (#97000278)	7567-8020 N. 32nd, 8023-8047 Church, 8951-8965 Park Sts., 8650-8118 E. D Ave., 8760-8905 Gull Rd., 9057-9063 RR; 42°22′27″N 85°27′26″W	Richland	
38	Rickman Hotel	Rickman Hotel	December 9, 1994 (#94001425)	345 N. Burdick; 42°17′39″N 85°35′01″W	Kalamazoo	
39	Martin W. Roberts House	Martin W. Roberts House	May 27, 1983 (#83000869)	703 Wheaton Ave. 42°16′54″N 85°35′33″W	Kalamazoo	
40	Rose Place Historic District	Rose Place Historic District	May 27, 1983 (#83000870)	Rose Pl. 42°16′58″N 85°35′08″W	Kalamazoo	
41	Enoch Shaffer House	Enoch Shaffer House	May 27, 1983 (#83000871)	1437 Douglas Ave. 42°18′22″N 85°36′12″W	Kalamazoo	
42	Patrick and Sarah Dobbins Shields House	Patrick and Sarah Dobbins Shields House	July 24, 2007 (#07000745)	6681 N. 2nd St. 42°21′19″N 85°44′46″W	Alamo	
43	South Street Historic District	South Street Historic District	August 28, 1979 (#79001159)	South St. between Oakland Dr. and Westnedge Ave.; also roughly W. Lovell St. from Oakland Dr. to Pearl St. and Academy St. east of Oakland; 42°17′22″N 85°35′32″W	Kalamazoo	Second set of boundaries represents a boundary increase of April 14, 1995
44	Sparks-Anderson House	Sparks-Anderson House	April 7, 2014 (#14000125)	7653 W. Main St. 42°17′43″N 85°41′58″W	Oshtemo Township	
45	State Hospital Gatehouse	State Hospital Gatehouse	May 27, 1983 (#83000872)	1006 Oakland Dr. 42°16′53″N 85°36′00″W	Kalamazoo	
46	State Theatre	State Theatre	November 17, 2021 (#83004623)	404 S Burdick St, 42°17′18″N 85°35′00″W	Kalamazoo	
47	Andrew J. Stevens House	Andrew J. Stevens House	May 27, 1983 (#83000873)	4024 Oakland Dr. 42°15′04″N 85°36′52″W	Kalamazoo	
48	Stuart Area Historic District	Stuart Area Historic District	May 27, 1983 (#83000874)	Roughly bounded by the Michigan Central railroad line, Douglas, Forbes, W. Main, North, and Elm Sts., and Kalamazoo and Grand Aves.; also roughly along Ransom and Willard Sts., Allen Boulevard and Eleanor St., and 425-433 Douglas St. and 818 North St. 42°17′40″N 85°35′54″W	Kalamazoo	Second set of boundaries represents a boundary increase of July 20, 1995
49	Charles E. Stuart House	Charles E. Stuart House	March 16, 1972 (#72000625)	427 Stuart Ave. 42°17′43″N 85°35′53″W	Kalamazoo	
50	Dr. Nathan M. Thomas House	Dr. Nathan M. Thomas House	April 22, 1982 (#82002843)	613 E. Cass St. 42°06′59″N 85°37′47″W	Schoolcraft	
51	United States Post Office	United States Post Office	December 26, 2017 (#100001930)	410 W. Michigan Ave. 42°17′30″N 85°35′16″W	Kalamazoo	
52	Upjohn Company Office Building	Upjohn Company Office Building	November 28, 2022 (#100008450)	301 John St; 42°17′22″N 85°34′52″W	Kalamazoo	
53	Vicksburg Historic District	Vicksburg Historic District	April 28, 2022 (#100007671)	East Highway, North and South Main, East and West Maple, East and West Park, East and West Prairie, East and West South, and West Washington Sts.; North and South Kalamazoo and South Michigan Aves; East and West Liberty Lns. 42°07′12″N 85°31′56″W	Vicksburg	
54	Vicksburg Union Depot	Vicksburg Union Depot	April 4, 2024 (#100010197)	300 N. Richardson St. 42°07′26″N 85°31′47″W	Vicksburg	
55	Vine Area Historic District	Vine Area Historic District	August 16, 1983 (#83000875)	Roughly bounded by S. Rose, S. Westnedge, W. Walnut, and Ranney Sts. 42°17′05″N 85°35′12″W	Kalamazoo	
56	William L. Welsh Terrace	William L. Welsh Terrace	May 27, 1983 (#83000876)	101-105 W. Dutton St. 42°17′05″N 85°35′00″W	Kalamazoo	

== Former listings ==
	Name on the Register	Image	Date listed	Date removed	Location	City or town	Description
1	East Hall	East Hall	February 23, 1978 (#78001501)	March 7, 2017	Oakland Dr. 42°17′10″N 85°35′47″W	Kalamazoo	
2	Fountain of the Pioneers	Fountain of the Pioneers	June 28, 2016 (#16000417)	August 19, 2019	Bronson Park, bounded by Academy, Rose, South & Park Sts. 42°17′25″N 85°35′08″W	Kalamazoo	Removed from the park in 2018 and delisted in 2019.
3	Western State Normal School Historic District	Western State Normal School Historic District	August 10, 1990 (#90001230)	March 7, 2017	Roughly bounded by Stadium Dr., Oliver St., and Davis St. 42°17′08″N 85°35′58″W	Kalamazoo	

== See also ==
- List of Michigan State Historic Sites in Kalamazoo County, Michigan
- List of National Historic Landmarks in Michigan
- National Register of Historic Places listings in Michigan
- Listings in neighboring counties: Allegan, Barry, Branch, Calhoun, Cass, St. Joseph, Van Buren
