= Fountain of the Pioneers =

- Formerly listed on the U.S. National Register of Historic Places
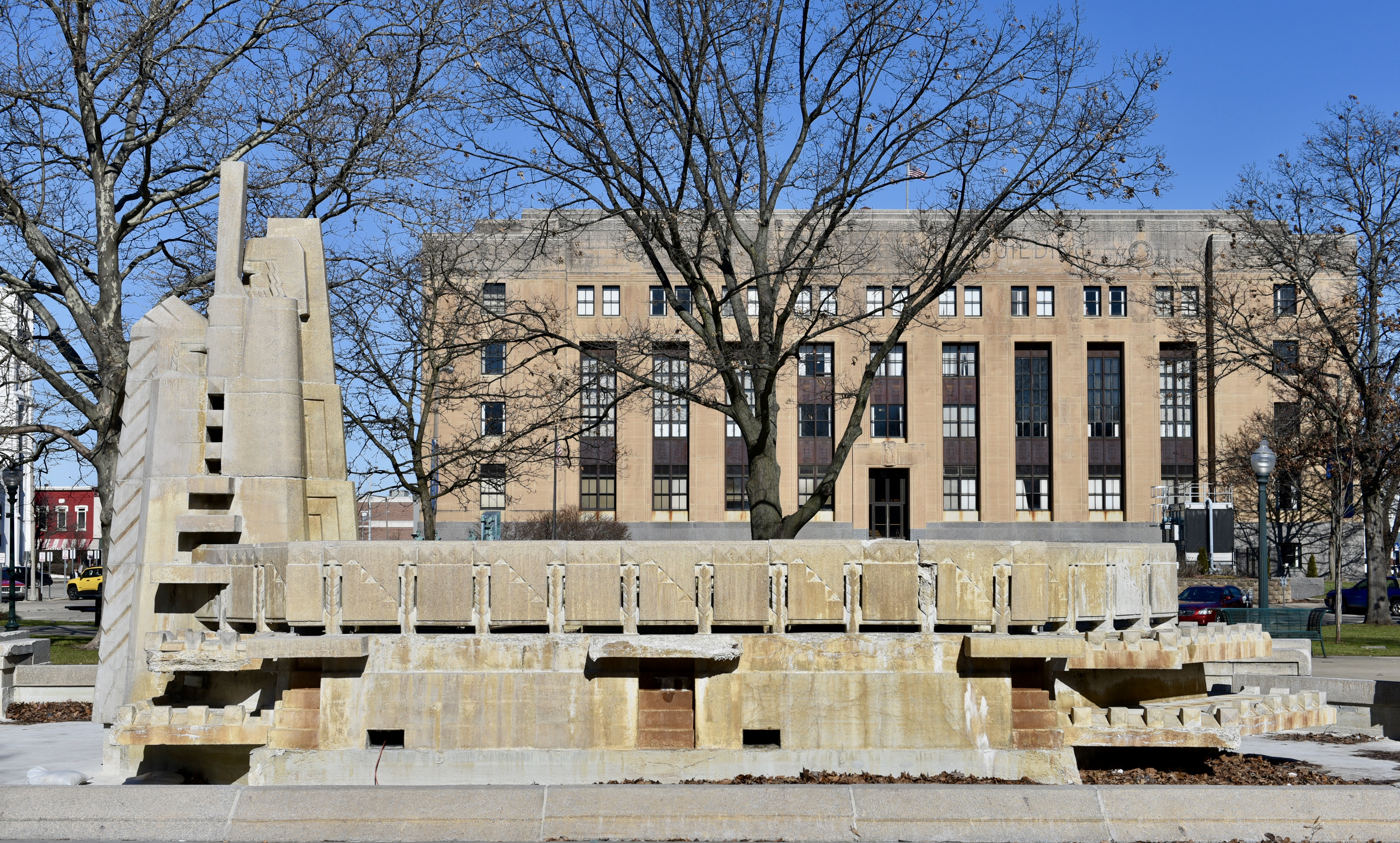
- Interactive map
- Location: Bronson Park, bounded by Academy, Rose, South & Park Sts., Kalamazoo, Michigan
- Coordinates: 42°17′25″N 85°35′08″W
- Area: less than 1 acre (0.40 ha)
- Built: 1940
- Architect: Alfonso Iannelli
- Architectural style: Modern, Art Deco
- NRHP reference No.: 16000417

Significant dates
- Added to NRHP: June 28, 2016
- Removed from NRHP: August 19, 2019

The Fountain of the Pioneers was a decorative fountain formerly located in Bronson Park (between bounded by Academy, Rose, South & Park Streets) in Kalamazoo, Michigan. It was listed on the National Register of Historic Places in 2016. It is significant as an outstanding example of work by architect and designer Alfonso Iannelli, combining elements of Prairie School, Modernist, Art Deco and Cultural Nationalism movements; it is also significant as one of the few public artworks referencing the Indian removal actions by the United States government in the 1800s. Because of the controversial nature of the sculpture, interpreted by some as depicting white supremacy, and because of the deteriorating condition of the fountain, it was removed from the park in 2018 and placed in storage. The statue was subsequently removed from the National Register of Historic Places in 2019.

== History ==
What is now Bronson Park encompasses squares of land set aside by Kalamazoo's founder, Titus Bronson. The land was officially dedicated as a public park in 1864, and over the next few decades trees, plantings, and sculptures were added, as well as two or three fountains in the park's center. The last of these fountains was a silo-esque 1927 "McColl" fountain. Public sentiment found the design of this fountain unappealing, and in 1936 a contest was held to design a replacement. The contest was won by Marcelline Gougler, a twenty-four-year-old University of Illinois art teacher who studied with Alfonso Iannelli. When the city requested some modifications to Gougler's design, Iannelli was invited to assist. Ianelli provided multiple ideas, and by 1937, the city contracted with him to provide a finished design for the fountain and surrounding area. Iannelli and the city worked on multiple designs through 1938, and by 1939 demolition of the old McColl fountain had begun. Construction on the new fountain designed by Iannelli was completed in 1940, and it was dedicated on June 6 of that year.

Although the fountain drew critical acclaim from Frank Lloyd Wright and Bruce Goff, among others, the theme of the fountain later began to draw criticism. While the fountain was being constructed, Iannelli had said,

Regarding the meaning of the Fountain of the Pioneers, the scheme of the fountain conveys the advance of the pioneers and the generations that follow, showing movement westward, culminating in the tower-symbol of the pioneer, (a glass panel projecting from the head indicates his vision): while the Indian is shown in a posture of noble resistance, yet being absorbed as the white man advances; the pattern of the rail indicates the rich vegetation and produce of the land.

Beginning in the 1990s, there were multiple calls for its removal, with debate over the work's meaning and value. Some believed it should be removed because it was racist and memorializing genocide, others believed it should stay because it depicted actual history that should not be forgotten. In addition, over the years the fountain was deteriorating, and by 2018 was in need of restoration. At the same time, controversy generally over potentially racist public monuments came to a head. The city decided to remove the fountain in April 2018.

== Description ==
The Fountain of the Pioneers contained three major elements: two are long, shallow pools, lying end-to-end, and a fountain sculpture located at one end of one pool. The pools are roughly rectangular, but pointed at opposite ends. The one which contained the sculpture is 135 feet long, 44 feet wide, and 24 inches deep. The second pool is spaced 66 feet away, and measures 119 feet in length, with the same height and width. The fountain was an elongated hexagonal box approximately 32 feet long by 16 feet wide by 8 feet high within the longer pool. The box contained the plumbing and lighting elements, as well as the sculpture. This sculptural feature was an obelisk roughly 18 feet tall, depicting a Pioneer and Indian figures at one end. These figures were depicted with strong lines and reduced detail, tightly linked, with the Indian figure placed lower than the Pioneer.
