= Drake Farmstead =

- Benjamin and Maria (Ogden) Drake Farm
- U.S. National Register of Historic Places
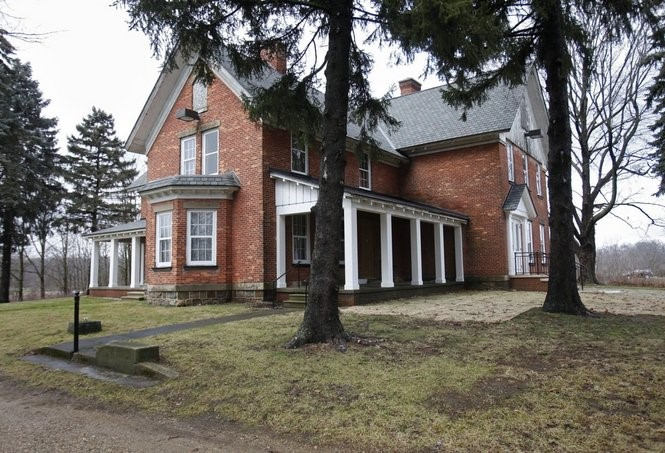

- Location within Michigan Location within the United States
- Interactive map
- Location: 927 N. Drake Rd., Kalamazoo, Michigan
- Coordinates: 42°18′03″N 85°39′12″W
- Area: 27 acres (11 ha)
- Built: c. 1852
- Architectural style: Late Victorian
- NRHP reference No.: 12001031
- Added to NRHP: December 12, 2012

The Benjamin and Maria (Ogden) Drake Farm, also known as the Drake Farmstead, is a farmstead located at 927 North Drake Road in Kalamazoo, Michigan. It was listed on the National Register of Historic Places in 2012, and as of 2021 is open to the public as the Drake Farmstead Park.

== History ==
In 1830, Benjamin Drake, his wife Maria, and several of their children moved to this site from St. Clair County. The family was the first Euro-American pioneers to settle in Oshtemo Township. The family constructed a log cabin near where the present house stands and began farming. More settlers joined them, and in 1833 they constructed the area's first school on the Drake property. By 1839, there were nearly 70 new residents in the township. In about 1852 constructed a portion of what is now the current farmhouse.

In 1882, a major fire destroyed most of the house. It was reconstructed using the remaining walls, but in a substantially different form. Benjamin Drake died the next year; his wife Maria followed in 1886. Their oldest child, Jane, inherited the farm and lived in the house until her own death in 1899. Jane willed the farm jointly to her only surviving sibling, George, and their niece Elizabeth Waterman Fuller. In 1908, the farm was sold to Thomas and Mary Stewart. They continued farming, and left the property to their daughter Helen Stewart after their death. Helen Stewart sold roughly half of the property to be developed, and after her death willed much of the remaining property to Western Michigan University, with a small section including the house, and farm buildings going to Kalamazoo College.

Western Michigan and Kalamazoo College sold the land to developers. In 2004, the Drake farmhouse was slated for demolition. However, Oshtemo Township purchased the house, carriage barn, and surrounding property, intending to create a public park. By 2017, additional property was added, and the house was also substantially restored. In 2021, the township opened the Drake Farmstead Park.

== Description ==
The Drake Farmstead consists of a 2-1/2 story, brick farmhouse, a 1-1/2 story frame carriage barn, and the remains of a larger barn located in a large yard with a long, tree-lined entry drive. The house itself reflects three periods of construction: the original c. 1852 design, the 1882 reconstruction, and later, twentieth century renovations. The present house is an upright and wing design, constructed of brick with a fieldstone foundation and a steeply pitched gable roof covered with asphalt shingles. An addition extends to the rear. The style of the house is suggestive of the Late Victorian period when it was reconstructed. The windows are double-hung, wood, six-over-six sash units with stone lintels and sills. The upright section contains a formal double-door entry framed by a slightly projecting square-plan columns and a projecting gable. A second entry is in the wing section, sheltered by a single-story shed-roofed porch with square columns.

The carriage house, located off one corner of the farmhouse, was likely constructed in the 1920s or 1930s. It is a 1-1/2 story frame structure, measuring roughly fifty feet by twenty-five feet, and is covered with vertical wood siding. It has a gable roof covered in asphalt shingles. Near the carriage bhouse is a cast concrete livestock watering trough and the concrete and stone foundation remains of former barns.
