= Patrick and Sarah Dobbins Shields House =

- U.S. National Register of Historic Places
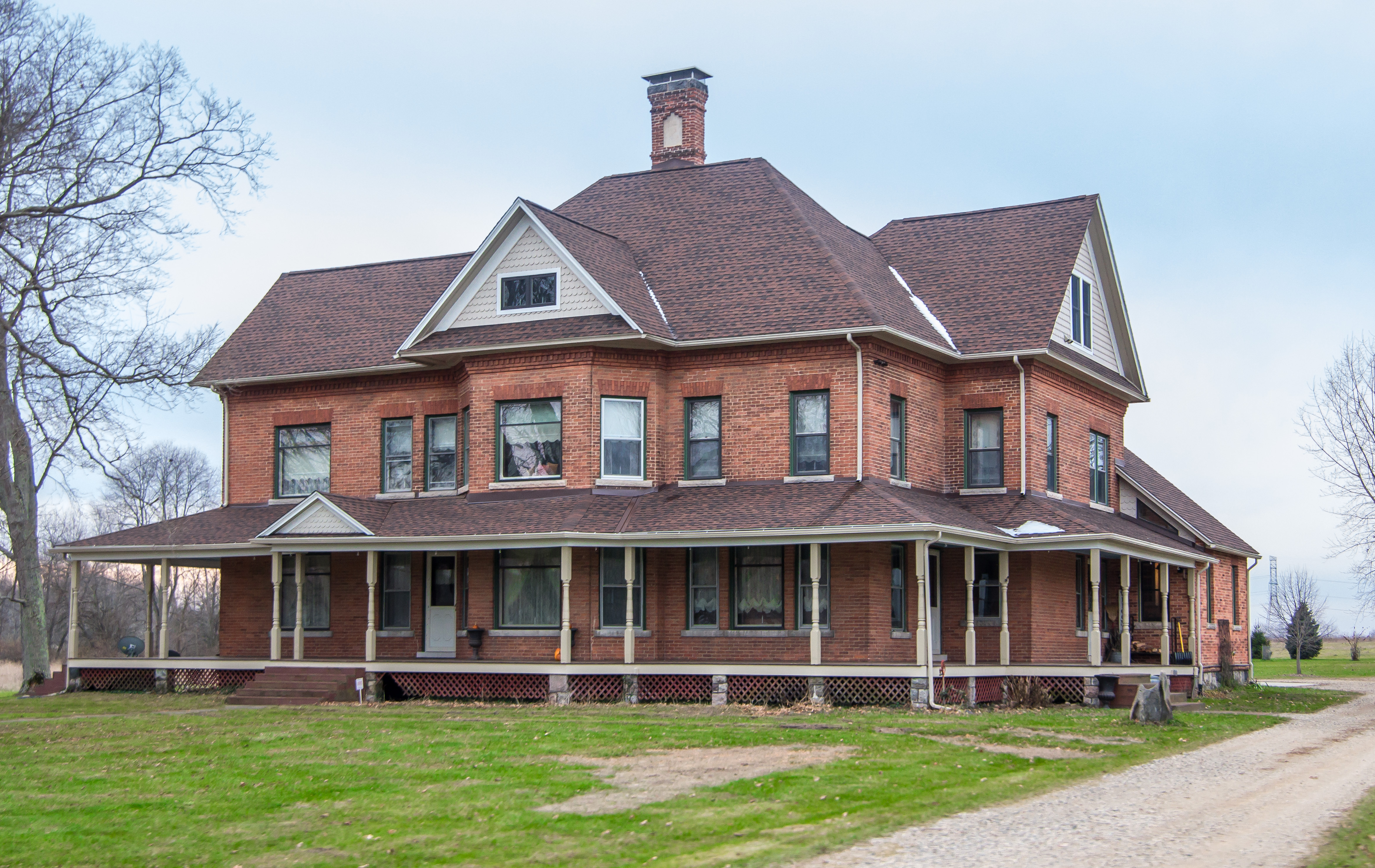

- Location within Michigan Location within the United States
- Interactive map showing the location of Dobbins Shield House
- Location: 6681 N. 2nd St., Alamo, Michigan
- Coordinates: 42°21′19″N 85°44′46″W
- Area: less than one acre
- Built: 1900
- Architectural style: Queen Anne
- NRHP reference No.: 07000745
- Added to NRHP: July 24, 2007

The Patrick and Sarah Dobbins Shields House is a single-family home located at 6681 North 2nd Street in Alamo, Michigan. It was listed on the National Register of Historic Places in 2007. The house is a relatively rare example of a rural Queen Anne made with patterned masonry, and is one of the few remnants of the former hamlet of Williams.

== History ==
In 1870, what was then known as the Kalamazoo and South Haven Railroad constructed a line through this area, passing through what was then the hamlet of Williams. The line was leased to the Michigan Central Railroad in 1871, and the easy access to transportation spurred a small agricultural and industrial boom in the area. The soil of the surrounding area was a sand and clay mixture, and by 1885 there was a brick-making factory located in Williams, which was soon joined by a mill and charcoal factory, as well as two other, independent brick-making businesses.

One of the brick-makers was Patrick Shields, who arrived in Williams in 1890 and purchased a factory near the railroad, just north of where this house now stands. Shields had previously worked in a brickyard in nearby Kendall, Michigan, another hamlet along the railroad. Shields's brick-making business was a success, and in 1900 he constructed a large brick home for his family near the brickyard. The Shields had a large family, and also used space in the house as a gathering place for community event. However, 1900 was the high point for the community of Williams, which reached a population of 125 and began declining soon after. The other two brickyards had closed by 1901, and the Shields brickyard lasted only until about 1910. Patrick Shields died in 1913, but his family continued to live in the house until the late 1930s or early 1940s, when new owners moved in.

== Description ==
The Patrick and Sarah Shields House is a large, three-story, red brick Queen Anne house, with a footprint defined by overlapping rectangles. The main section of the house contains three steeply pitched roofs sections: a large, hipped central section with two lower gabled portions which intersect. A large wrap-around porch runs across the front of the house and encircles about half of the main floor; a second, smaller porch is in the rear. The brickwork is laid in stretcher courses through most of the house. At the top of doors and windows, bricks are laid in decorative patterns to form hoods. More decorative brickwork is located under the second story eaves.

The house has six exterior doorways, some opening onto the porch. The first and second story windows are one-over-one wood sash and frame unit with stone sills. The third floor windows, located in the gable ends, have been replaced. The gable ends are clad with fishscale shingling.
