= Rose Place Historic District =

- U.S. National Register of Historic Places
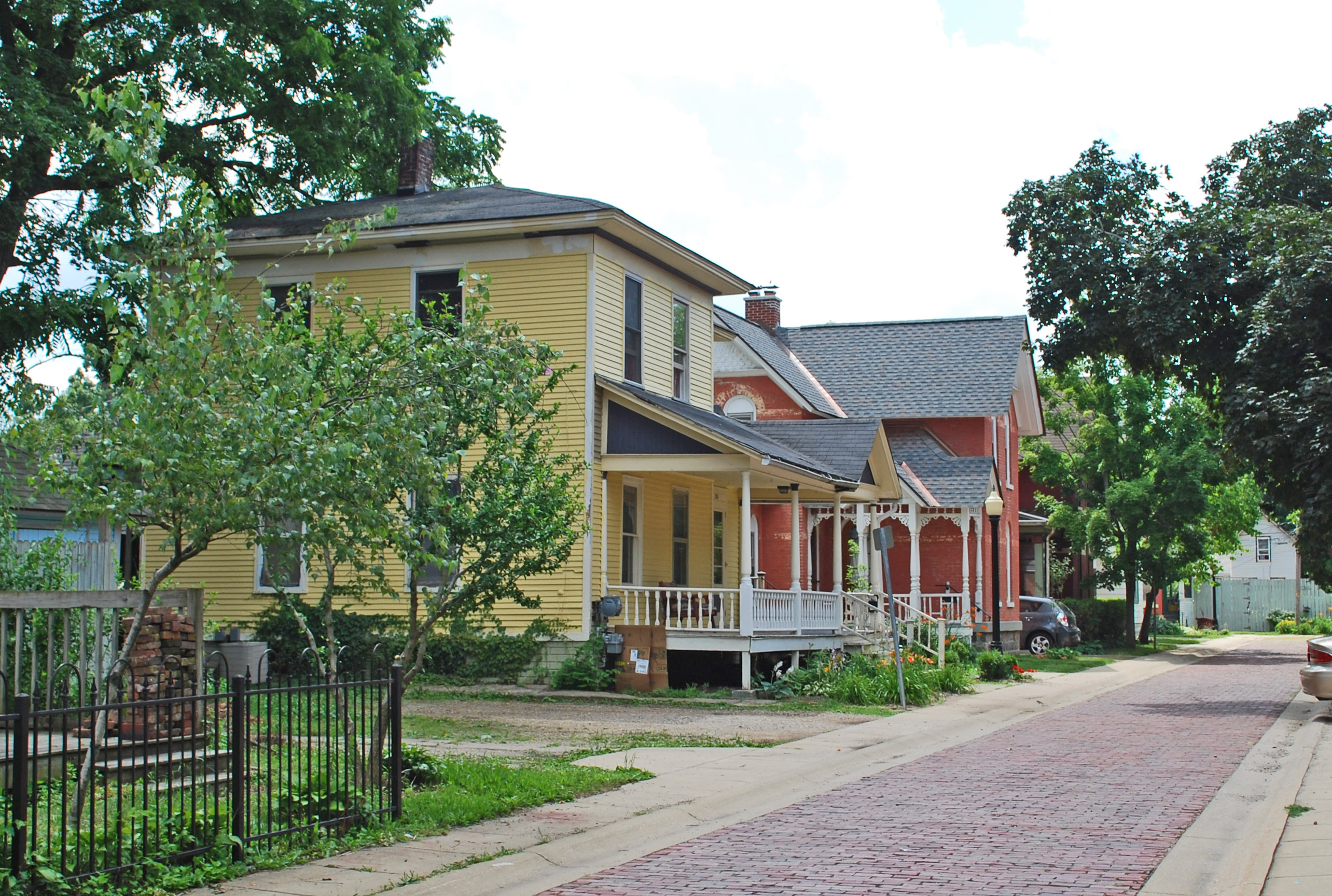

- Location within Michigan Location within the United States
- Interactive map
- Location: Rose Place, Kalamazoo, Michigan
- Coordinates: 42°16′58″N 85°35′08″W
- Area: 1.2 acres (0.49 ha)
- Architectural style: Mixed (more than 2 styles from different periods), Queen Anne
- MPS: Kalamazoo MRA
- NRHP reference No.: 83000870
- Added to NRHP: May 27, 1983

The Rose Place Historic District is a small residential historic district located along Rose Place in Kalamazoo, Michigan. It is an example of an "urban court development," which proliferated in Kalamazoo around the turn of the 20th century. The district was listed on the National Register of Historic Places in 1983.

== History ==
In 1887, Kalamazoo masons John P. Culver and John DeSmit, Jr., purchased the backyard property of the houses located at 904 South Rose and 830 South Rose. They created the small urban court of Rose Place, and began construction on houses lining the street. By 1890, four houses were complete, including one for Culver's own use. Many of the earliest residents of Rose Place were masons and builders, who likely constructed their own houses. This led to an unusually high level of craftsmanship in the neighborhood. More, comparable houses were added in the next few years, and most of the lots were full by 1900; the remaining lots were built up in the first part of the twentieth century. In addition to skilled tradesmen, other early residents of Rose Place were also solidly middle class, including a doctor, business owner, engineer, and plant manager.

== Description ==
The Rose Place Historic District is located along a single block of Rose Place, a very narrow dead-end alley. The district includes the eleven houses fronting on the Rose Place and two at the mouth of the alley fronting on Rose Street; these were primarily built between 1887 and 1900. The houses are small scale, finely detailed, Late Victorian structures, although one later house, built in 1920, is a bungalow. Many of the structures are of brick construction and are notable for their detailed window ornamentation and finely crafted wooden porches.
