= Kalamazoo Federal Building and U.S. Courthouse =

- United States Post Office
- U.S. National Register of Historic Places
- U.S. Historic district – Contributing property
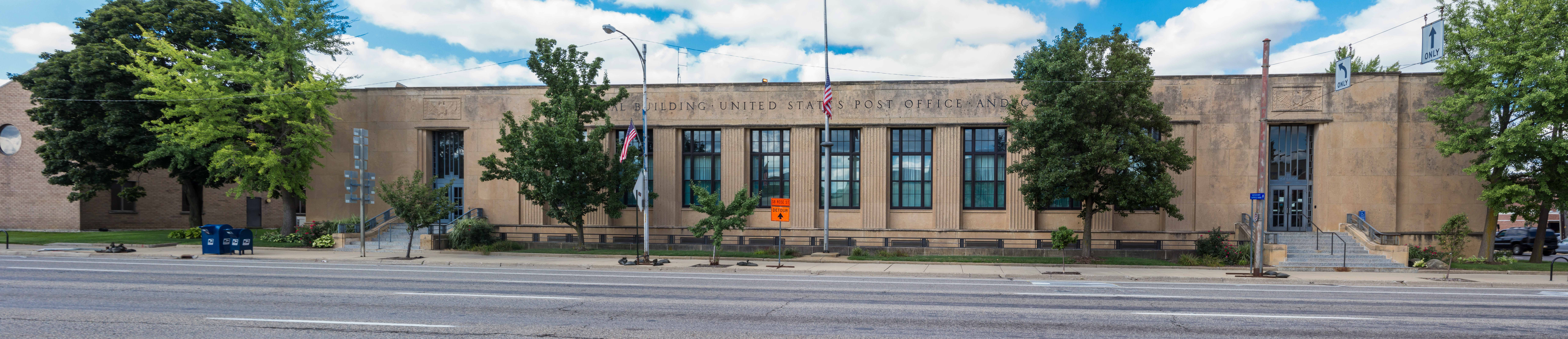

- Location within Michigan Location within the United States
- Interactive map
- Location: 410 W. Michigan Ave., Kalamazoo, Michigan
- Coordinates: 42°17′30″N 85°35′16″W
- Area: less than 1 acre (0.40 ha)
- Built: 1939
- Architect: Louis Simon, Leroy and Newlander, George D. Mason and Co.
- Architectural style: Art Moderne
- Part of: Bronson Park Historic District (ID83000855)
- NRHP reference No.: 100001930
- Added to NRHP: December 26, 2017

The Kalamazoo Federal Building and U.S. Courthouse is a federal building and former post office located at 410 W. Michigan Avenue in Kalamazoo, Michigan. It was listed on the National Register of Historic Places in 2017.

== History ==
Construction on Kalamazoo's downtown post office began in the 1930s as part of the New Deal program. The building was designed as a collaboration among Supervising Architect of the Treasury Louis Simon, Kalamazoo architects Rockwell Leroy and Manuel M. Newlander, and George D. Mason and Company of Detroit. Construction was completed in 1939. The building was used as a post office until 1959, when the main post office moved to a new facility on Miller Road. Between 1962 and 1963, the building was renovated to house court and federal office space. As of 2019, it continues to house federal offices, including the U.S. District Court, as well as U.S. Bankruptcy Court, Probation, Pre-trial Services, and Marshals Service.

== Description ==
The Kalamazoo Federal Building is an Art Moderne building constructed of reinforced concrete, with the primary facades clad in Kasota limestone. The Michigan Avenue facade has two primary entrances, one at each end, that incorporate Art Deco metalwork. Between are tall windows separated by fluted piers, giving a vertical component to the strongly horizontal structure of the building.
