= Enoch Shaffer House =

- U.S. National Register of Historic Places
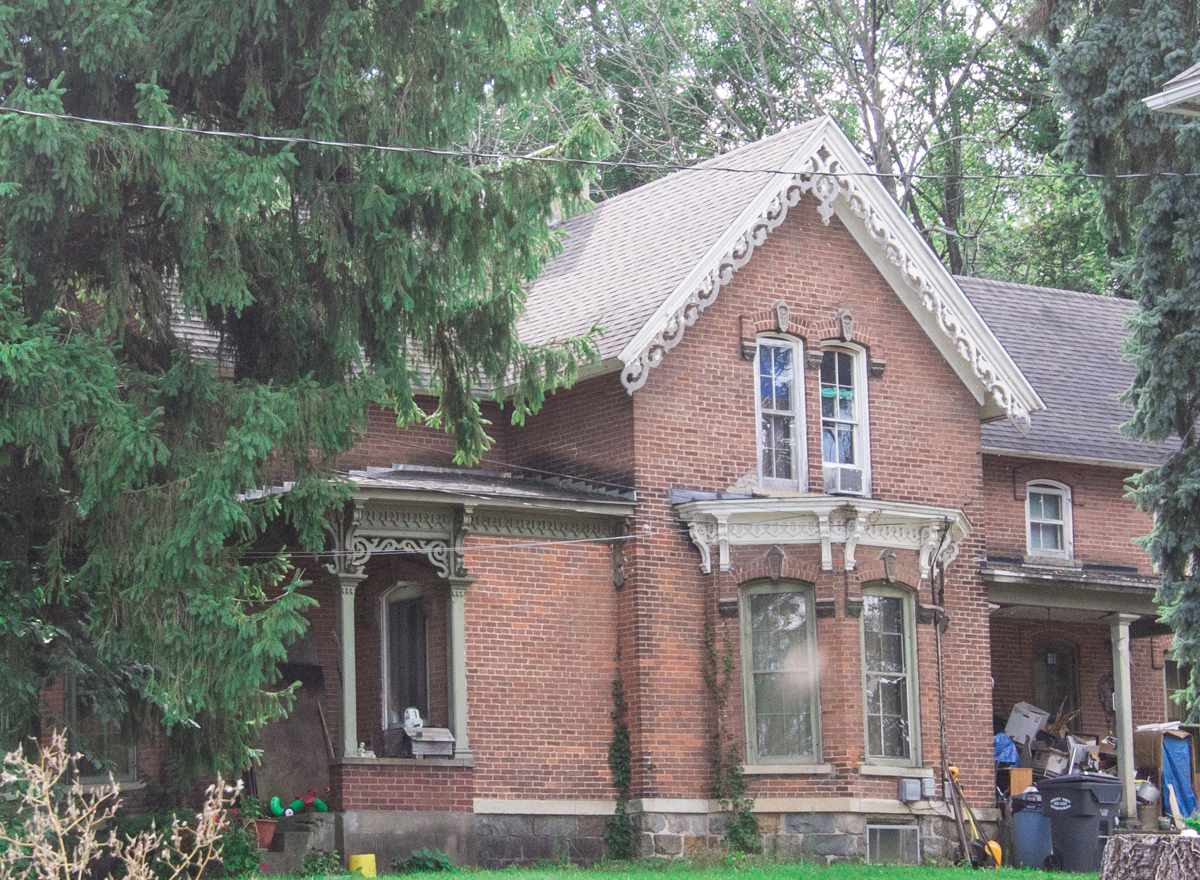
- Interactive map
- Location: 1437 Douglas Ave., Kalamazoo, Michigan
- Coordinates: 42°18′22″N 85°36′12″W
- Area: less than one acre
- Built: 1870
- Architectural style: Late Victorian
- MPS: Kalamazoo MRA
- NRHP reference No.: 83000871
- Added to NRHP: May 27, 1983

The Enoch Shaffer House is a single-family home located at 1437 Douglas Avenue in Kalamazoo, Michigan. It is one of only a few Late Victorian farmhouses in Kalamazoo, and is notable for its fine detailing. It was listed on the National Register of Historic Places in 1983.

== History ==
Enoch Shaffer was born in Hillsville, Pennsylvania In 1841. He worked as a baker, photographer, and dry-good salesman, and served in the Union Army in the Civil War. Afterward, he became a farmer, and married Josephine Lilly in 1868. After the marriage, the Shaffers purchased land adjacent to the old Lilly farm. The constructed this house soon after, likely in about 1870. Enoch Shaffer turned his attention to farming potatoes on the surrounding farm, and lived in this house until his death In 1913. Josephine continues to live in the house for a number of years more.

== Description ==
The Enoch Shaffer House is a narrow, two-story, Late Victorian red brick structure. It sits on a stone foundation and has a cross-gable roof. The house has substantial ornamental trim, including segmental-arched door and window openings containing raised brick caps with a central keystone, brackets under the eaves of the porch and bay window, and curvilinear bargeboards decorated with fleur-de-lis.
