= Martin W. Roberts House =

- U.S. National Register of Historic Places
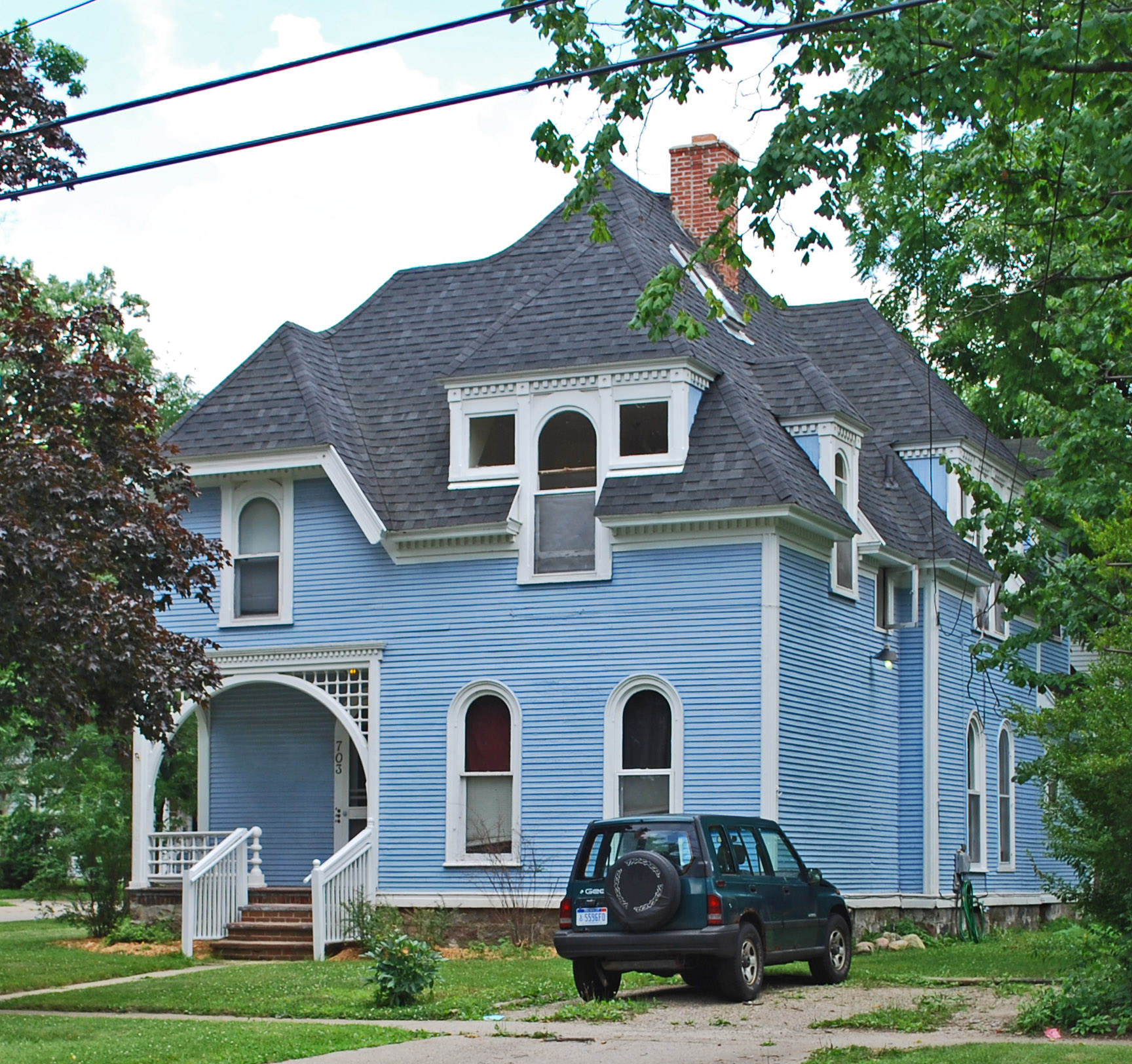
- Interactive map
- Location: 703 Wheaton Ave., Kalamazoo, Michigan
- Coordinates: 42°16′54″N 85°35′33″W
- Area: less than one acre
- Built: 1870
- Architect: Martin W. Roberts
- Architectural style: Queen Anne
- MPS: Kalamazoo MRA
- NRHP reference No.: 83000869
- Added to NRHP: May 27, 1983

The Martin W. Roberts House is a single-family home located at 703 Wheaton Avenue in Kalamazoo, Michigan. It was listed on the National Register of Historic Places in 1983.

== History ==
Martin W. Roberts was born in Batavia, New York and moved to Kalamazoo about 1870. Roberts was a prominent builder and architect in late nineteenth-century Kalamazoo. When he arrived in 1870, he constructed this house for his own use. The house itself is significant in that, more than his other designs, it likely reflected many of the architect's design values and personality. The house was originally designed as an Italianate structure. In 1886, Roberts re-made it into a Queen Anne design. Roberts lived here until his death in January, 1910. In the later 20th century, the house was converted into apartments.

== Description ==
The Martin W. Roberts House is a handsome, two-story, frame, Queen Anne house. It is built in an irregular plan, with a picturesque roof structure consisting of both hip and jerkinhead roofs. The house detailing includes arcaded front and side porches, dentiled cornices, and a number of round-headed windows.
