= Andrew J. Stevens House =

- U.S. National Register of Historic Places
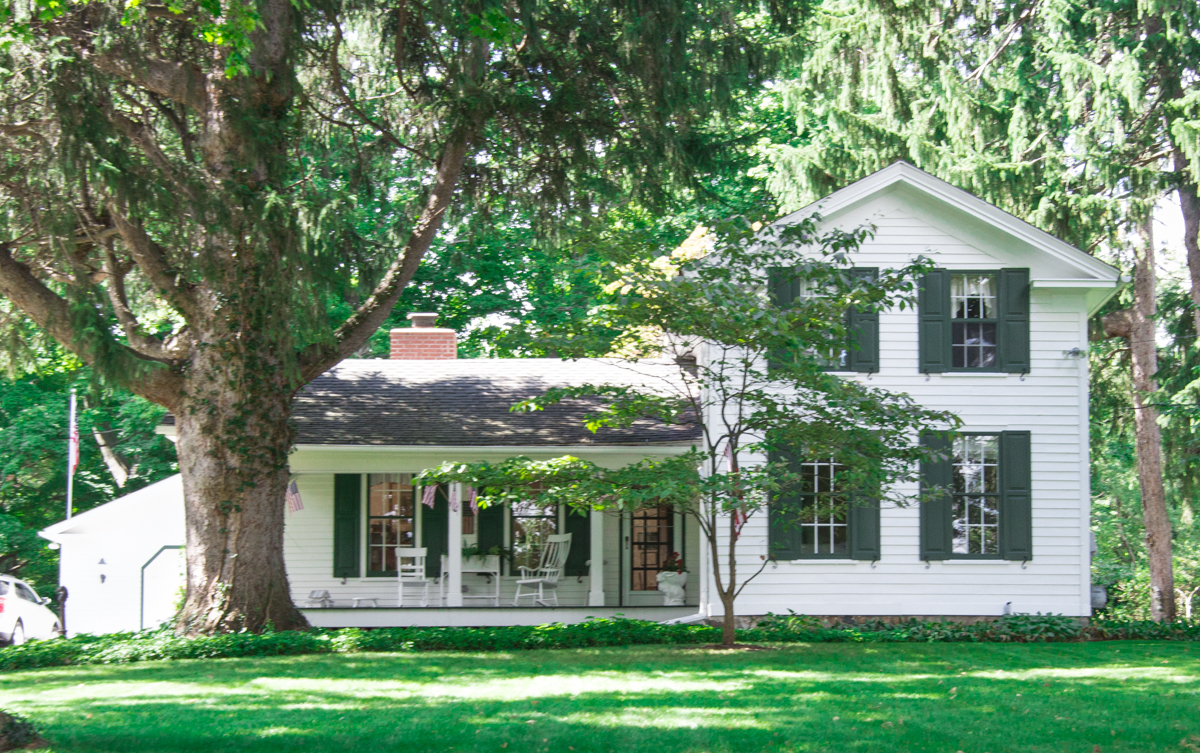
- Interactive map
- Location: 4024 Oakland Dr., Kalamazoo, Michigan
- Coordinates: 42°15′06″N 85°36′52″W
- Area: 2 acres (0.81 ha)
- Built: 1854
- Architectural style: Greek Revival
- MPS: Kalamazoo MRA
- NRHP reference No.: 83000873
- Added to NRHP: May 27, 1983

The Andrew J. Stevens House is a single-family home located at 4024 Oakland Drive in Kalamazoo, Michigan. It was listed on the National Register of Historic Places in 1983. It is one of the few examples of an L-plan, Greek Revival farmhouse that still exists in Kalamazoo.

== History ==
Andrew J. Stevens was born in New York State near the beginning of the 19th century. In 1834, as a young boy, he moved to Kalamazoo with his family. His father purchased a farm and Andrew grew up as a farmer. In 1854 had this house built for himself and his wife, Martha on land adjacent to his father's farm. Stevens lived in the house until his death in 1909. A rear kitchen and family room were later added to the house, and a detached garage was added near the house in the 1980s, and the house underwent substantial renovation in the following years.

== Description ==
The Stevens House is a frame, Greek Revival structure consisting of a two-story end-gable main section and 1-1/2-story, flank-gable wing. The house is set on a tree-lined road, set well back from the road. A veranda with square posts fronts the wing section and shelters the main entrance. The house has its original double-hung, six-over-six windows and nearly all of its original Greek Revival trim. On the interior, most of the first floor has hardwood oak floors, and the second floor retains its original pine wood floor.
