= David Lilienfeld House =

- U.S. National Register of Historic Places
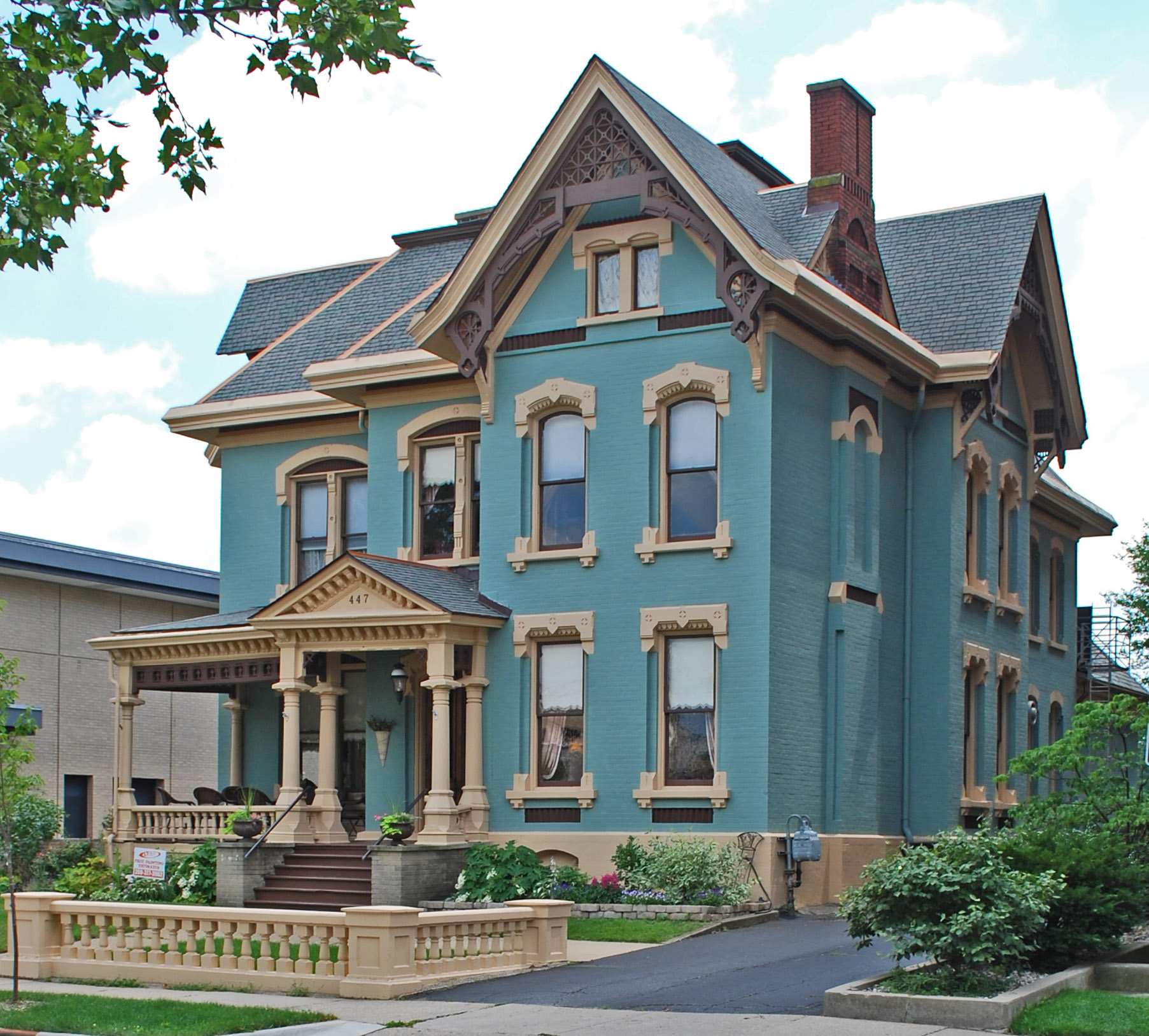

- Location within Michigan Location within the United States
- Interactive map showing Lilienfeld House’s location
- Location: 447 W. South St., Kalamazoo, Michigan
- Coordinates: 42°17′22″N 85°35′18″W
- Area: less than one acre
- Built: 1878
- Architectural style: Stick/Eastlake, Queen Anne
- MPS: Kalamazoo MRA
- NRHP reference No.: 86000119
- Added to NRHP: January 23, 1986

The David Lilienfeld House was built as a single-family home located at 447 West South Street in Kalamazoo, Michigan. It was listed on the National Register of Historic Places in 1986. As of 2019, the house is operated as the Kalamazoo House Bed & Breakfast.

== History ==
David L. Lilienfeld was born in 1836 in Hanover, Germany. He arrived in Kalamazoo In 1859 and started cigar making and wholesale liquor businesses with his brother William. He became a prominent member of the Kalamazoo business community. In 1867, Lilienfeld purchased a lot and small home on this site for his family. In 1878, he moved the previous house to another lot and built the current structure to replace the earlier house. Lilienfeld lived there until his death in 1899.

The house was owned by a number of owners for the next few decades, until 1932 when John Donovan began leasing it for use as a funeral parlor. At some point the original square tower fronting the house was removed. It remained a funeral home until 1985, when Louis and Annette Conti purchased the home, saving it from planned demolition and carefully restoring it. They turned it into an inn and restaurant, adding a commercial kitchen in the 1990s, before having financial difficulties. The house was vacant for a time in the early 2000s, and was further restored and opened as a bed & breakfast in 2007.

== Description ==
The Lilienfeld House is a two-and-one-half-story, brick, Late Victorian house. The design contains elements drawing on Queen Anne, Stick, and Eastlake styles. The house has long, narrow windows with sandstone window sills and hoods. A wooden porch fronts the house. Particularly notable features include stone window hoods with incised decoration, openwork wooden gable ornaments, and a panel-brick chimney stack. The brickwork of the house has been painted.
