= Alonzo T. Prentice House =

- U.S. National Register of Historic Places
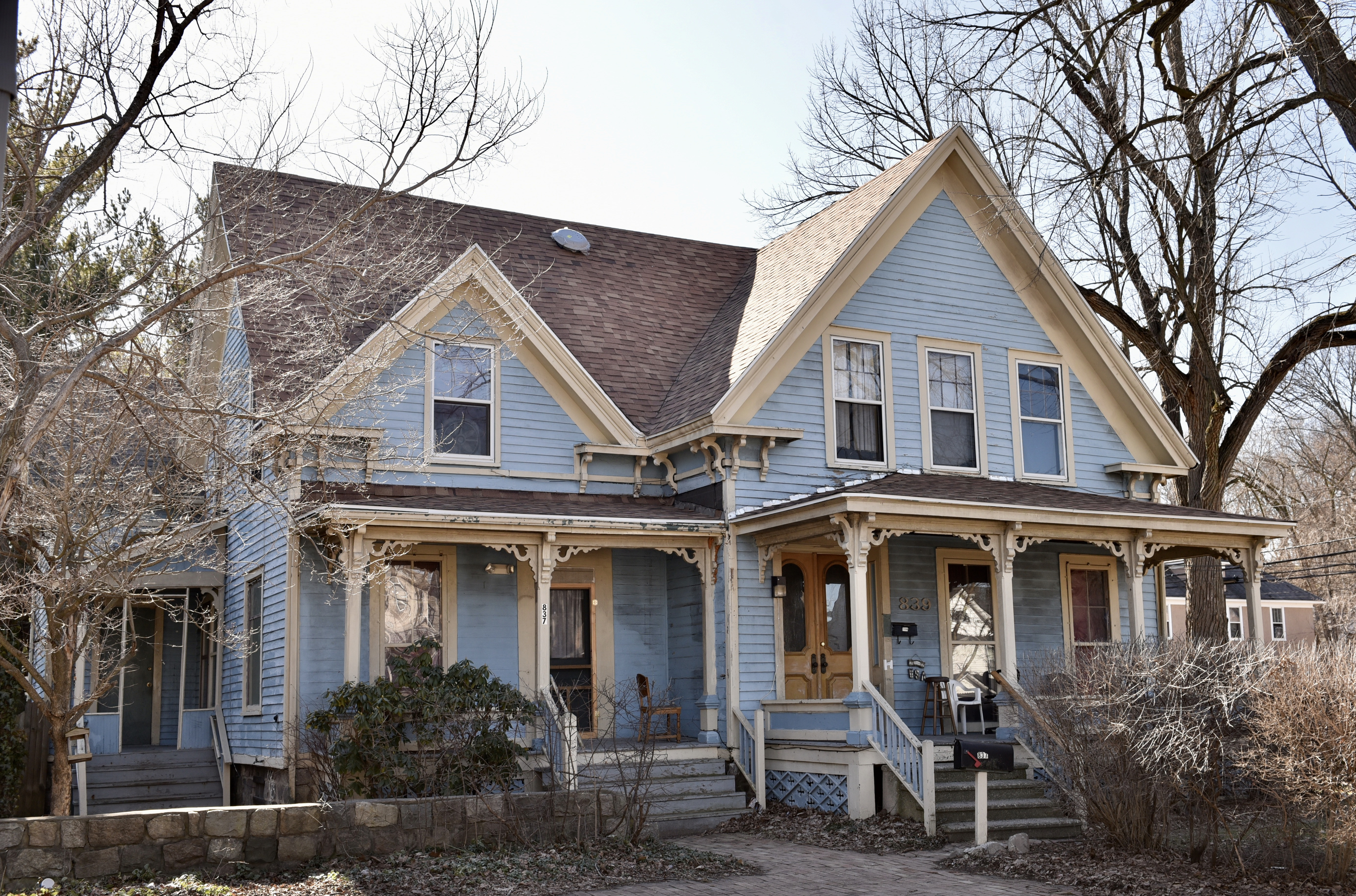

- Location within Michigan Location within the United States
- Interactive map
- Location: 839 W. Lovell St., Kalamazoo, Michigan
- Coordinates: 42°17′19″N 85°35′42″W
- Area: less than one acre
- Built: 1884
- Architectural style: Late Victorian
- MPS: Kalamazoo MRA
- NRHP reference No.: 83000868
- Added to NRHP: May 27, 1983

The Alonzo T. Prentice House is a single-family home located at 839 West Lovell Street in Kalamazoo, Michigan. It was listed on the National Register of Historic Places in 1983.

== History ==
Alonzo Prentice was born in Lockport, New York in 1828. He was a jeweler by trade, and married Miss Harriet Heats in New York. He moved to Kalamazoo from New York just after the middle of the 19th century. He later worked for the Michigan Central Railroad as an ocean steamship line ticket agent. Prentice had this house built in 1884 for his family. Prentice and his wife lived here until their deaths; hers in 1902 and his in 1907. In the later part of the 20th century, the house was converted into apartments.

== Description ==
The Prentice House is a two-story Late Victorian frame house built in an L plan. It has steep gable roofs with classical cornices. The house is particularly notable for its pleasing overall design and elaborate porch detailing. The porch which includes chamfer-edged posts, curvilinear brackets, and lattice-work aprons in a quatrefoil pattern.
