= William L. Welsh Terrace =

- U.S. National Register of Historic Places
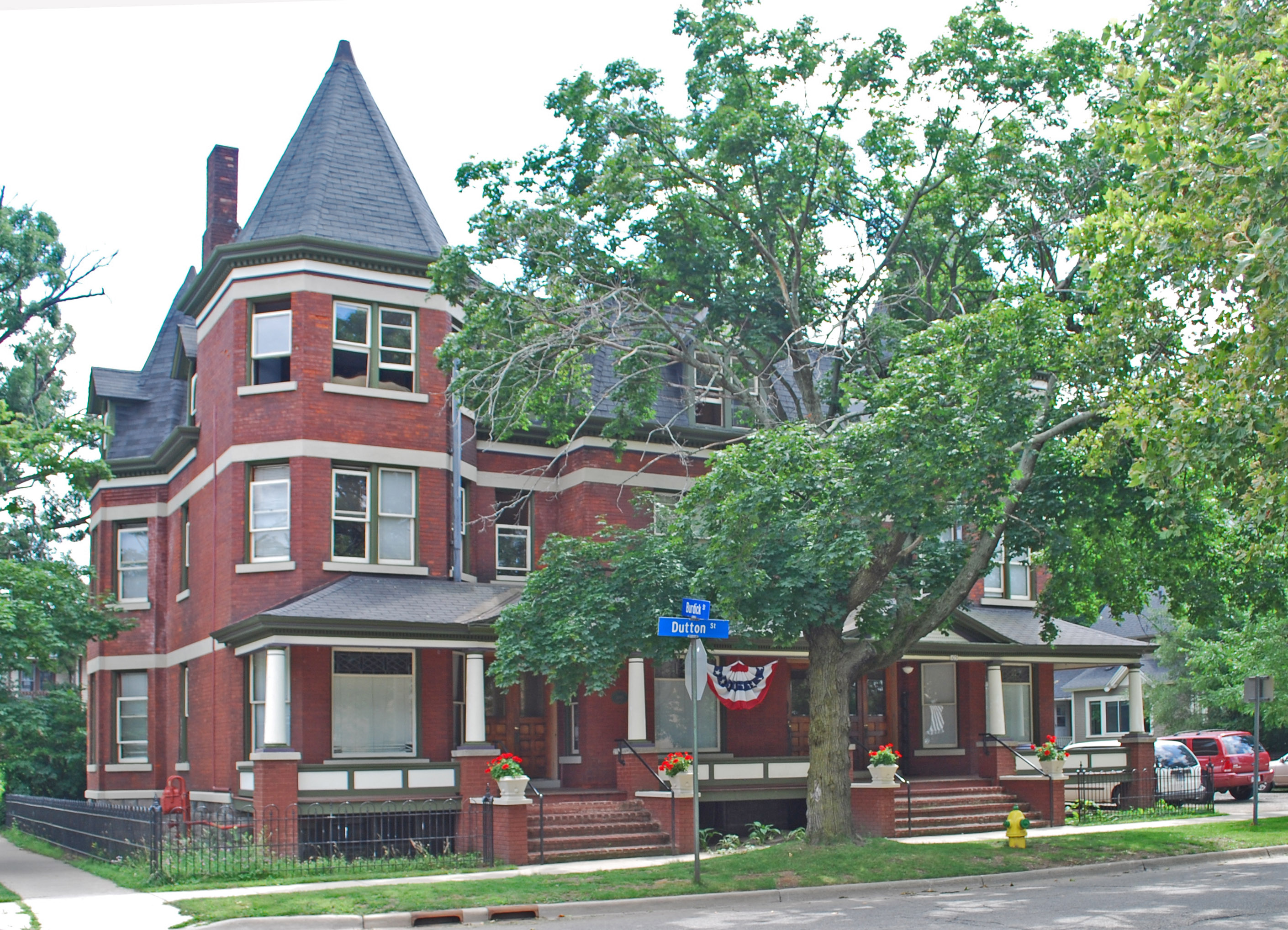

- Location within Michigan Location within the United States
- Interactive map
- Location: 101-105 W. Dutton St., Kalamazoo, Michigan
- Coordinates: 42°17′05″N 85°35′00″W
- Area: less than one acre
- Built: 1895
- Built by: William L. Welsh
- Architectural style: Colonial Revival
- MPS: Kalamazoo MRA
- NRHP reference No.: 83000876
- Added to NRHP: May 27, 1983

The William L. Welsh Terrace is a multi-family dwelling located at 101-105 West Dutton Street in Kalamazoo, Michigan. It was listed on the National Register of Historic Places in 1983.

== History ==
William L. Welsh was one of Kalamazoo's prominent nineteenth-century builders. In 1895, Welsh constructed this small apartment building on land adjacent to his house. The building was designed as a triplex for well-to-do families. Among the first occupants of the Welsh Terrace was Kalamazoo paper manufacturer Frank Milham, one of the founders of the Bryant Paper Mill.

== Description ==
The Welsh Terrace is a three-story brick veneer Colonial Revival structure topped with a mansard roof. The facade is divided into three parts, with a central, projecting pavilion flanked by an engaged towers with conical roofs. A broad Tuscan-column front porch extends across the structure. Bay window units on each side elevation also have high, conical roofs. Dentiled cornices run under the roof. Gabled dormers, some containing round-headed windows, pierce the mansard roof.
