= Illinois Envelope Co. Building =

- U.S. National Register of Historic Places
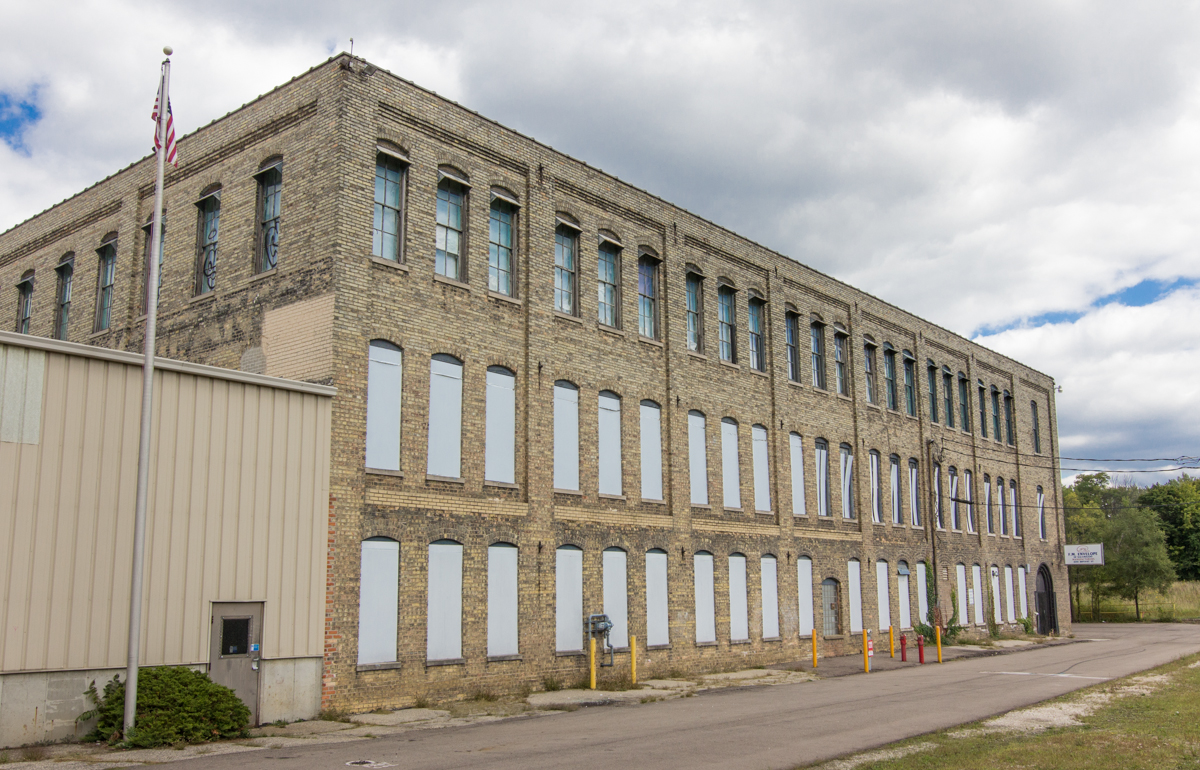
- Interactive map
- Location: 400 Bryant St., Kalamazoo, Michigan
- Coordinates: 42°16′19″N 85°34′40″W
- Area: 1 acre (0.40 ha)
- Built: 1904
- MPS: Kalamazoo MRA
- NRHP reference No.: 83000861
- Added to NRHP: May 27, 1983

The Illinois Envelope Co. Building is a former industrial structure located at 400 Bryant Street (alternatively, 311 East Alcott Street) in Kalamazoo, Michigan. It was listed on the National Register of Historic Places in 1983. In 2018, the building became the home of the Kalamazoo County Health and Community Services Department.

== History ==
The Illinois Envelope Company was established in 1902 in Centralia, Illinois. In 1904, the company moved to Kalamazoo at the request of the Bryant Paper Company, its major creditor, which was also located in Kalamazoo at the time. The company built this factory at the time, with additions constructed in 1941. The Illinois Envelope Company remained in the building until 1998, when the company was purchased by Mail-Well. The plant was closed five months later. The building remained vacant until 2016, when the Kalamazoo County Board of Commissioners agreed to renovate and lease the building for a new health and human services facility. The department moved into the building in 2018.

== Description ==
The Illinois Envelope Co. Building is a large, rectangular, three-story building, built in a mill-type frame construction. It is built of red-tan brick, and has a flat roof pierced by several saw-tooth skylights. The building was constructed to house the factory. warehouse. and offices of the company. The main entrance is through an archway located in the corner of the building. The windows are narrow, double-hung, four-over-four units with segmental-arch heads, windows. Brick additions of one and two stories are connected at the building's northeast corner.
