= Fanckboner-Nichols Farmstead =

- U.S. National Register of Historic Places
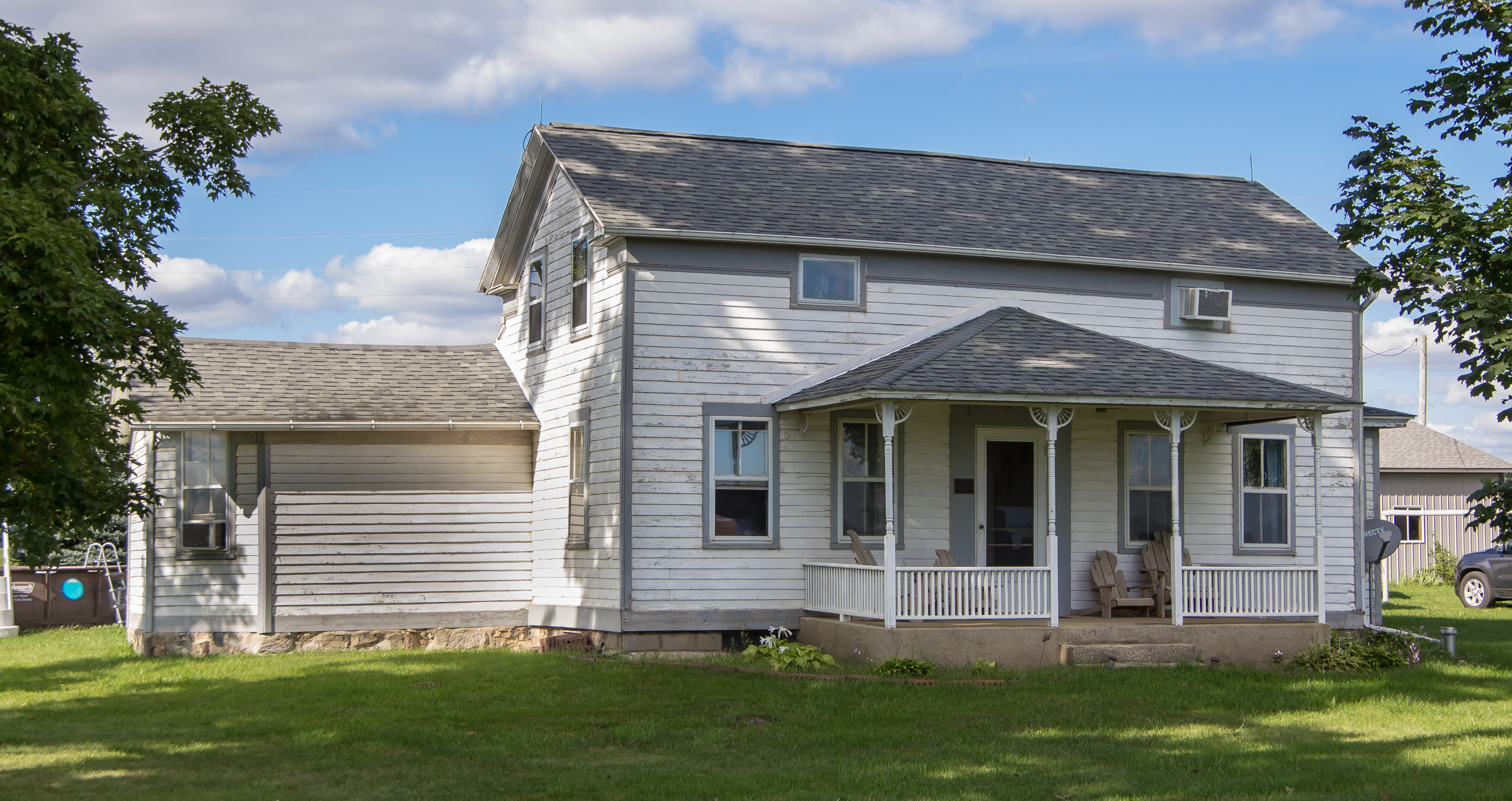
- Interactive map
- Location: 5992 West VW Ave., Prairie Ronde Township, Michigan
- Coordinates: 42°07′18″N 85°39′55″W
- Area: 3 acres (1.2 ha)
- Built: c. 1840
- Architectural style: Greek Revival
- NRHP reference No.: 07000387
- Added to NRHP: May 2, 2007

The Fanckboner-Nichols Farmstead is a farmhouse and associated buildings located at 5992 West VW Avenue in Prairie Ronde Township, Michigan. It was listed on the National Register of Historic Places in 2007.

== History ==
European settlers first arrived in Prairie Ronde Township in 1828. In 1837, William and Elizabeth Crose Fanckboner moved to Prairie Ronde from Warren County, New Jersey along with their five children, following Elizabeth's father, Christopher Crose, and brother, Jesse Miller Crose, who had settled nearby earlier in the 1830s. The Fanckboners and Croses came from Scott’s Mountain, Oxford Township, New Jersey in what was then called Sussex (now Warren) County. Just to the north is the small town of Belvidere, and Easton lies to the west of the Delaware River in Pennsylvania. Three Fanckboner males, presumably related, arrived at Philadelphia from Germany in 1752 aboard the Duke of Wirtenburg. One of them, Conrath or Conrad (1720-1781) Fanckboner (alternate spellings: Funckbohner, Fangbonner), was the grandfather of William Fanckboner, Sr. Christopher Crose, the elder, is in Oxford Township, New Jersey in 1780. He died there in 1799. His son, Christopher (1783-1857), married Sabra Miller (1784-1866). She was from Westfield NJ, near New York City and her family can be traced back two more generations there.

Accompanying the Fanckboners and Croses, were the Gingles family (Ingels, alternate spelling), also from the same area in w. New Jersey. James Gingles was married to Hannah Crose (b. 1812), another daughter of Christopher and Sabra. The Gingles had the farm just to the east of Christopher Crose and its ownership was passed to their son, Christopher Gingles. Other Prairie Ronde and Schoolcraft families that came from Sussex-Warren County were: VanKirk, Stuart, and Decker (and others by marriage). Families that came from adjacent areas in New Jersey and eastern Pennsylvania were: McCreary (see next paragraph); Middleton (see next paragraph); Troxel (Edmund, of Schoolcraft's Troxel House, was born near Easton, in eastern Pennsylvania); Fellows (Col. Abiel Fellows'biography is in Durant's 1880 history of Kalamazoo County); DeLong (lived a quarter mile west of the Fanckboner farm, but had Flowerfield connections); (Deborah) Smith (married Samuel Hackett whose farm was one half mile west of the Fanckboner farm); and Shaver (see below).

Three of the William and Elizabeth Fanckboner children who spent their younger years at the Fanckboner homestead married into the family of Preston Johnston McCreary, who with Bazel Harrison, Abram Shaver and others, constituted the founding settlers in Prairie Ronde. The McCrearys came to Prairie Ronde from upstate New York and Erie, PA. Before that, Preston’s grandfather, Joseph (1732-1802) lived in the Lancaster-York area of eastern Pennsylvania (near Belvidere). Christianne Middleton (1807-1868) married Preston in 1828, and is buried in Harrison Cemetery. She was the daughter of George Middleton (1780-1841) and Mary Kriss Burson. George Middleton was from Monmouth, NJ, the reputed birthplace of Abram Shaver.

Abram Ingels Shaver, an original settler of Prairie Ronde and an iconic figure in Schoolcraft’s early history, was said to have been born in Monmouth, New Jersey, which is on the coast, just south of New York City. There are two significant Shaver (there are alternate spellings, with Shafer being most common) lines in Belvidere, Sussex-Warren County. One of those lines(Casper Shaver), owned a mill in Belvidere. This Shaver line had extensive trading connections with the coast, including Elizabethtown, New Jersey. While here are some intriguing clues suggesting a connection between the Monmouth Shaver line and the Belvidere Shaver line, a solid link of Abram to the Belvidere area has not been established. Also, to note, Abram's daughter, Mary, married George Green Crose, a son of Christopher and Sarah (from Belvidere).

In 1838, the Fanckboners purchased the farmland where the Fanckboner-Nichols Farmstead is now located. According to a local historian, Dr. Alexis Praus, “Thomas Sheldon first acquired the land patent from the government, November 5, 1833. The next owner was Erastus Newton from whom William Fankboner (Praus’ spelling) bought the land July 17, 1838. ”William and Elizabeth likely constructed a small temporary house, then built what is now the front section of the existing farmhouse in about 1840. The Fanckboners lived and raised their children, including two born in Michigan, in this house, for decades. The house itself was expanded twice during the nineteenth century. The farm is on prairie land that lies between the forested area of "Big Island" (where Schoolcraft, the village, lies) to the east and the prairie-forest boundary to the west. Both Big Island and the western prairie boundary can be seen from the farm.

The Fanckboner's youngest daughter, Libbie, married a neighbor and a farmhand for William Fanckboner (1870 Prairie Ronde census), Leroy Nichols, in 1875. After William and Elizabeth Fanckboner died (in 1881 and 1888), Libbie and Leroy Nichols bought out the other heirs to the farm and managed the acreage. The Nichols line arrived in Prairie Ronde in the late 1840s, with Orson and his father, Daniel. This Nichols line runs from 1638 in Ipswich-Reading-Framingham, Massachusetts to upstate New York (possibly due to a land grant from Joseph Nichols, Jr.’s service in the revolutionary war), and then from there to Michigan. The 1850 census indicates that Orson owned 136 improved and 11 acres of unimproved farmland, east of Harrison Cemetery and just northeast of the Fanckboner farm. Orson's wife was Elizabeth Felt. Her Felt line came from Connecticut and, likely, upstate New York.

Libbie died in 1905, but Leroy continued to live at the farm with his children. In the early 1900s, he had the present large barn built, along with a number of other outbuildings. Leroy Nichols married Emma Kellogg in 1912, and the couple lived on the farm until 1924. They then moved into Schoolcraft village and rented out the farm. In 1938, Leroy and Libbie's son Harold and his wife Lillian moved onto the farm. They farmed until the 1950s, then rented out acreage to other farmers. Harold and Lillian lived there until their deaths in 1989 and 2003, respectively. The farm was passed on to their children and their descendants.

== Description ==
The Fanckboner-Nichols Farmstead consists of approximately three acres, which contains a farmhouse, barn, Workshop/Woodshed, and grain bin, along with trees, a large yard, and a cistern. The farmhouse as originally built was a small Greek Revival I-house with a low second story. The exterior is clad with clapboarded with plain cornerboards, and a broad frieze with classical cornices with returns runs along the top. The front has a center entry flanked with square-head double-hung windows. On the front, two small horizontal "eyebrow" penetrate the frieze. Small double-hung windows are located in the gables. Nineteenth century additions of a gabled section and a lean-to have expanded the houses's footprint in the rear. Another bedroom wing was also added in the early 1900s. A Victorian, hipped roof front porch with turned columns was added in the early 1900s, replacing an original Greek Revival style porch.

The workshop/woodshed, dating from the early 1900s, is located near the house. It is a long, narrow, gable-roof, one-story structure clad in horizontal wood siding. The barn, also dating from the early 1900s, is a rectangular, gambrel-roof building on a low concrete foundation clad in its original vertical boarding. The grain bin, dating from about 1950, is a cylindrical metal bin with a conical roof, located near the barn.
