= Stuart Area Historic District =

- U.S. National Register of Historic Places
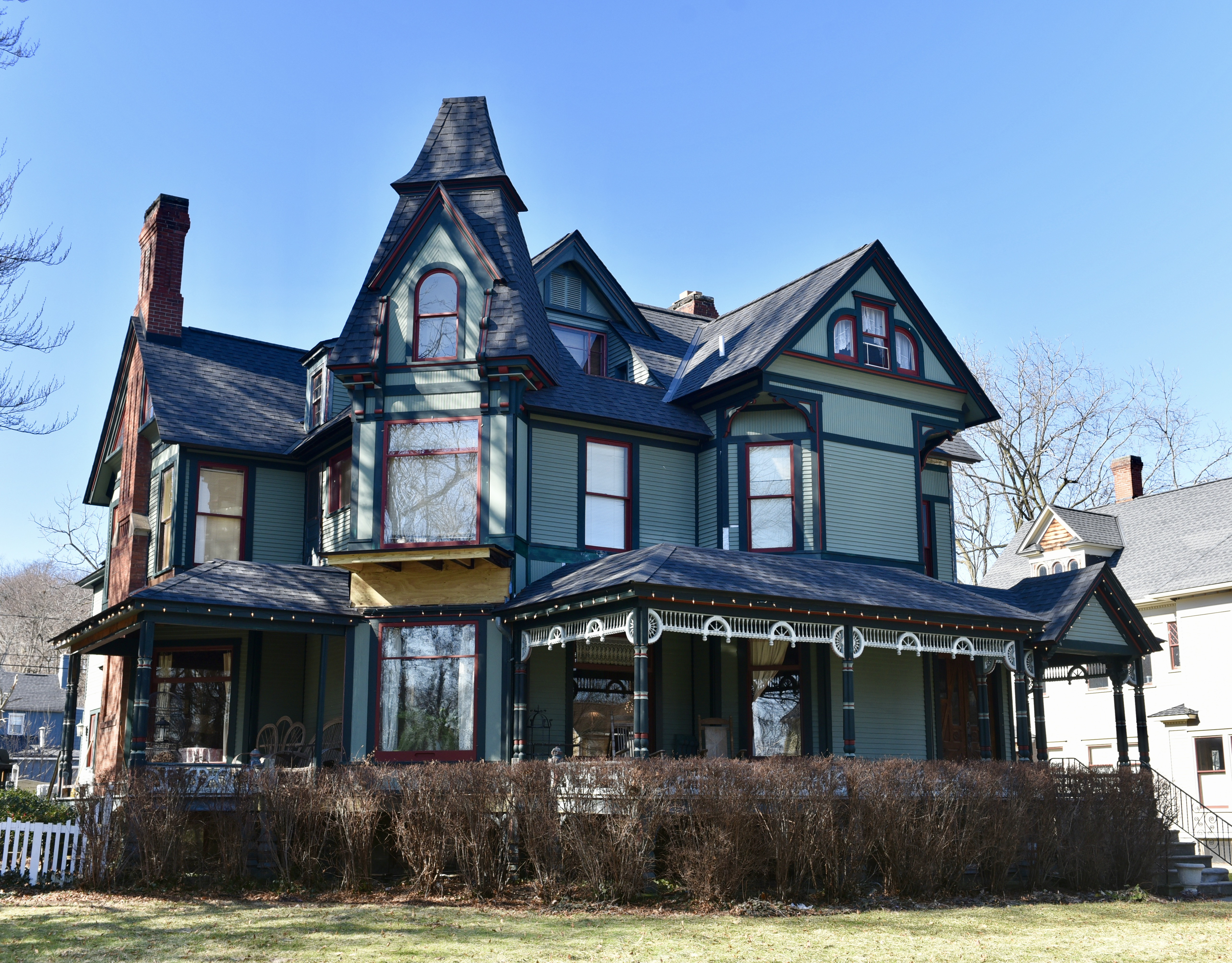
- 229 Stuart Avenue

- Location within Michigan Location within the United States
- Interactive map showing the location of Stuart Area Historic District
- Location: Roughly bounded by Michigan Central RR, Douglas, Forbes, W. Main, North, Elm Sts., Kalamazoo and Grand Ave., Kalamazoo, Michigan
- Coordinates: 42°17′40″N 85°35′54″W
- Area: 122 acres (49 ha)
- Architect: Charles A. Gombert,
- Architectural style: Mixed (more than 2 styles from different feriods), Late Victorian
- MPS: Kalamazoo MRA
- NRHP reference No.: 83000874 (original); 95000448 (increase)

Significant dates
- Added to NRHP: May 27, 1983
- Boundary increase: July 20, 1995

The Stuart Area Historic District is a primarily residential historic district in Kalamazoo, Michigan, roughly bounded by the Michigan Central Railroad, Douglas, Forbes, West Main, North, and Elm Streets, and Kalamazoo and Grand Avenues. The bulk of the district was listed on the National Register of Historic Places in 1983, with additions in 1995.

== History ==
In the 1840s and 1850s, the Stuart area began to be developed as a largely rural suburb adjacent to Kalamazoo. The nearby Mountain Home Cemetery, located just to the west (and part of the district) was platted at about the same time. The construction of the Charles E. Stuart House by senator Charles E. Stuart in 1854 marked the beginning of an upswing in development. However, the area remained semi-rural until 1884, when a horse-car line was established in the neighborhood. This began an increase in development that lasted into the twentieth century. During this time, the neighborhood became the city's most fashionable residential district, as the most prominent businessmen and manufacturers built houses there. These included no less than three United States senators: Charles E. Stuart, Francis B. Stockbridge, and Julius C. Burrows. This was a time that the city was booming, and the wealth of its leading citizens was reflected in the houses they built for their families. In addition, more middle-class families moved into the smaller houses in lots surrounding the core in the Stuart area. These were typically skilled tradesmen, professionals, and small business owners.

As the twentieth century started, the housing shortages in Kalamazoo made the Stuart neighborhood, by then very accessible from the heart of downtown, an attractive place for redevelopment. Some of the earliest large mansions were sited on deep lots, the rear of which were subdivided to provide space for additional housing. Today, the neighborhood retains much of its original historic character and integrity.

== Description ==
The existing district contains 322 homes, while the later addition contains an additional 53 homes. These structures are primarily mostly single and multi-family residences, built in the late nineteenth and early twentieth-century, and spanning a variety of architectural styles and types. The district particularly contains examples of Greek Revival, Gothic Revival, Italianate, Eastlake, Queen Anne, and Colonial Revival styles. The district also contains Mountain Home Cemetery, incorporated in 1849.
