= Peter B. Appeldorn House =

- U.S. National Register of Historic Places
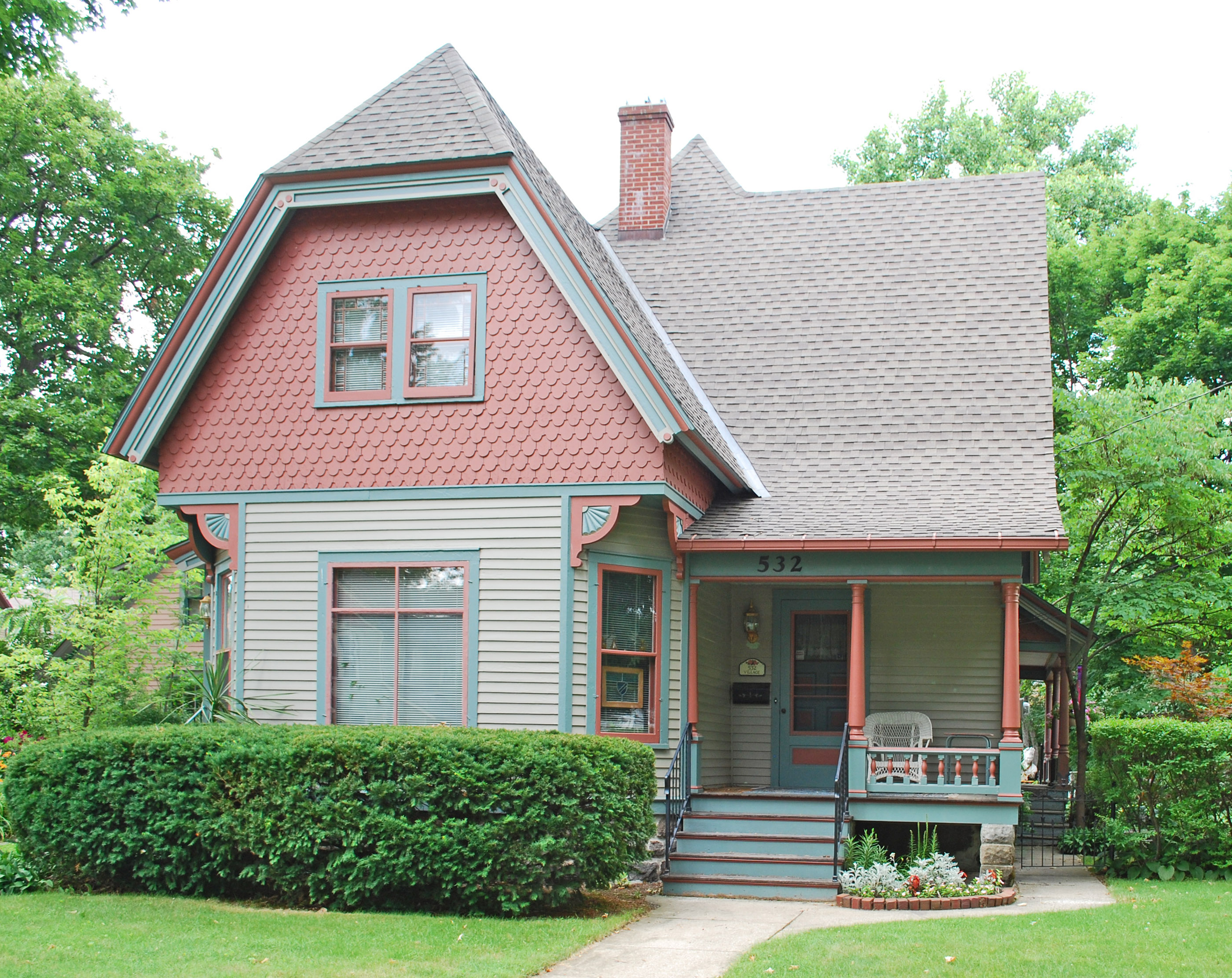
- Interactive map
- Location: 532 Village St., Kalamazoo, Michigan
- Coordinates: 42°16′59″N 85°35′30″W
- Area: less than one acre
- Built: 1895
- Architectural style: Queen Anne
- MPS: Kalamazoo MRA
- NRHP reference No.: 83000854
- Added to NRHP: May 27, 1983

The Peter B. Appeldorn House is a single-family home located at 532 Village Street in Kalamazoo, Michigan. It was listed on the National Register of Historic Places in 1983.

== History ==
In the 1850s, Ryer Appeldorn, a Dutch shoemaker, emigrated from Holland and settled in Kalamazoo. He established a successful tannery and shoe shop in the area, and his sons carried on the business. One of Ryer's sons, Peter B. Appeldorn, purchased this lot in 1894. He had this house built for his family in 1895. The Appeldorns lived in the house until World War II.

== Description ==
The Peter B. Appeldorn House is a two-story frame Queen Anne structure. It is built in an L-plan, with a small open porch, having Colonial Revival posts and balustrade, located in the angle of the ell. The facade contains a projecting jerkinhead front gable section on one side, visually balanced by a small porch and its steeply pitched roof. The high front gable is cantilevered out above a first floor level with beveled corners, with the upper floor clad in fishscale shingles. The side elevation is very similar, also featuring both a prominent gable and on open porch.
