= Lawrence and Chapin Building =

- U.S. National Register of Historic Places
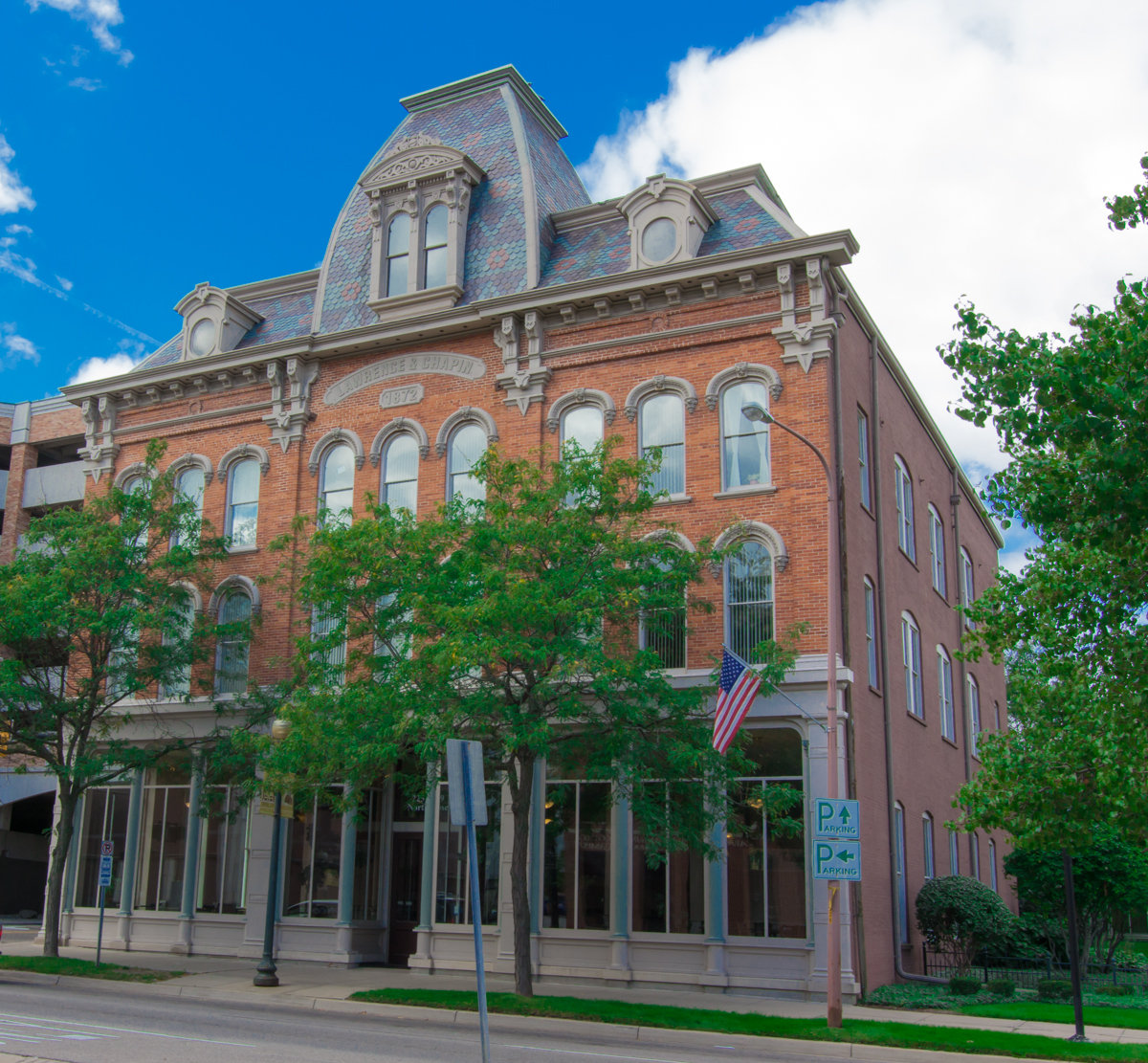

- Location within Michigan Location within the United States
- Interactive map
- Location: 201 N. Rose St., Kalamazoo, Michigan
- Coordinates: 42°17′34″N 85°35′07″W
- Area: less than one acre
- Built: 1870
- Built by: Bush & Patterson
- Architect: Lemuel Dwight Grosvenor
- Architectural style: Second Empire
- MPS: Kalamazoo MRA
- NRHP reference No.: 83000862
- Added to NRHP: May 27, 1983

The Lawrence and Chapin Building', also known as the Vermeulen Furniture Building, is a commercial building located at 201 North Rose Street in Kalamazoo, Michigan. It was listed on the National Register of Historic Places in 1983.

== History ==
Iron manufacturing was Kalamazoo's first heavy industry. In the middle of the 19th century, a factory making iron implements was constructed on this site. In 1870, the firm owned by William S. Lawrence and Dr. L. C. Chapin began construction on this building, designed by architect Lemuel Dwight Grosvenor, at the same site. The firm of Bush & Patterson built the factory. Construction was finished in 1872, and the company quickly became successful. However, as the century progressed, iron gave way to steel. Chapin died, and Lawrence lost his fortune. About the turn of the century, he sold this factory. The building subsequently housed a mission, a skating rink, and an interurban railway station. It was then sold to the Vermeulen Furniture Company, who occupied the building for over 50 years. The building was renovated in 1994 as part of the Arcadia Commons project.

== Description ==
The Lawrence & Chapin Building is a massive four-story, brick Second Empire structure topped with a mansard roof with a central tower. Dormers pierce the roof. The building measures 68 feet in width and 188 feet in depth. Piers divide the facade into bays; the piers are topped with paired cornice brackets. Windows have round heads.
