= Rickman House =

- Rickman Hotel
- U.S. National Register of Historic Places
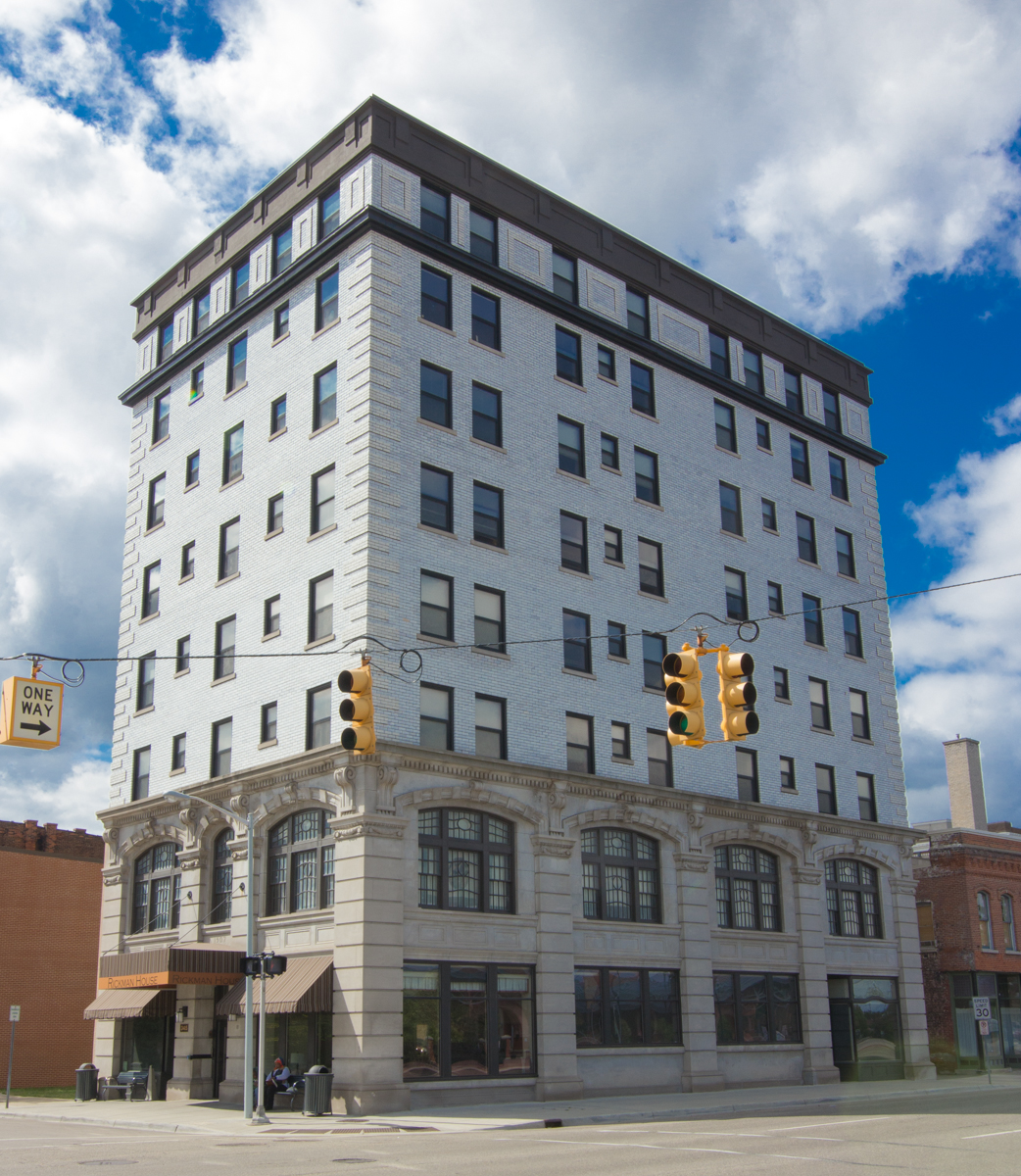
- Interactive map
- Location: 345 N. Burdick, Kalamazoo, Michigan
- Coordinates: 42°17′39″N 85°35′01″W
- Area: less than one acre
- Built: 1907
- Built by: Rickman Brothers
- Architect: Claire Allen
- Architectural style: Classical Revival
- MPS: Kalamazoo MRA
- NRHP reference No.: 94001425
- Added to NRHP: December 9, 1994

The Rickman House is an apartment building located at 345 North Burdick in Kalamazoo, Michigan. It was formerly a hotel known as the Rickman Hotel. It was listed on the National Register of Historic Places in 1994.

== History ==
George Rickman, Sr. arrived in Kalamazoo in 1872 to be the superintendent of construction at the Kalamazoo State Hospital. In 1884, he formed his own company known as Rickman & Sons, which specialized in the construction of houses. Four of Rickman's seven sons eventually joined him, an in 1900 the firm's name was changed to Rickman Brothers, presumably due to the death of Rickman senior. In 1905, the firm purchased this plot of land directly across the street from the Michigan Central Railroad Station with the intention of constructing a hotel. In 1907, they hired Jackson, Michigan architect Claire Allen to design the building, and began construction of the hotel. Construction lasted 12 months, and the hotel opened in May 1908.

The Rickman Brothers firm owned the hotel for only two years, until 1910, when they declared bankruptcy. After that time, the facility was operated as a hotel under multiple owners and managers. However, as the passenger railroad business slowly died, the building's location became less optimal for use as a hotel. In the 1960s the Rickman Hotel was renamed and converted into a senior citizen's residence. It was then used as a residence for single adults. The building was renovated in the 1980s and renamed the Rickman House. Another major interior renovation was completed in 2012.

== Description ==
The Rickman House is an eight-story rectangular, steel-frame, Neoclassical former hotel building. It occupies a corner lot, and has two major facades on Kalamazoo Avenue and Burdick. Each primary facade has a tripartite composition, consisting of a two-story rusticated limestone base, a five-story glazed white brick mid-section with corner quoins and square-head double-hung windows, and an attic story with square-head windows sandwiched between two metal cornices. The base section contains two-story window bays with segmental-arched head separated by rusticated piers supporting a dentiled cornice.
