= Oshtemo Town Hall =

- U.S. National Register of Historic Places
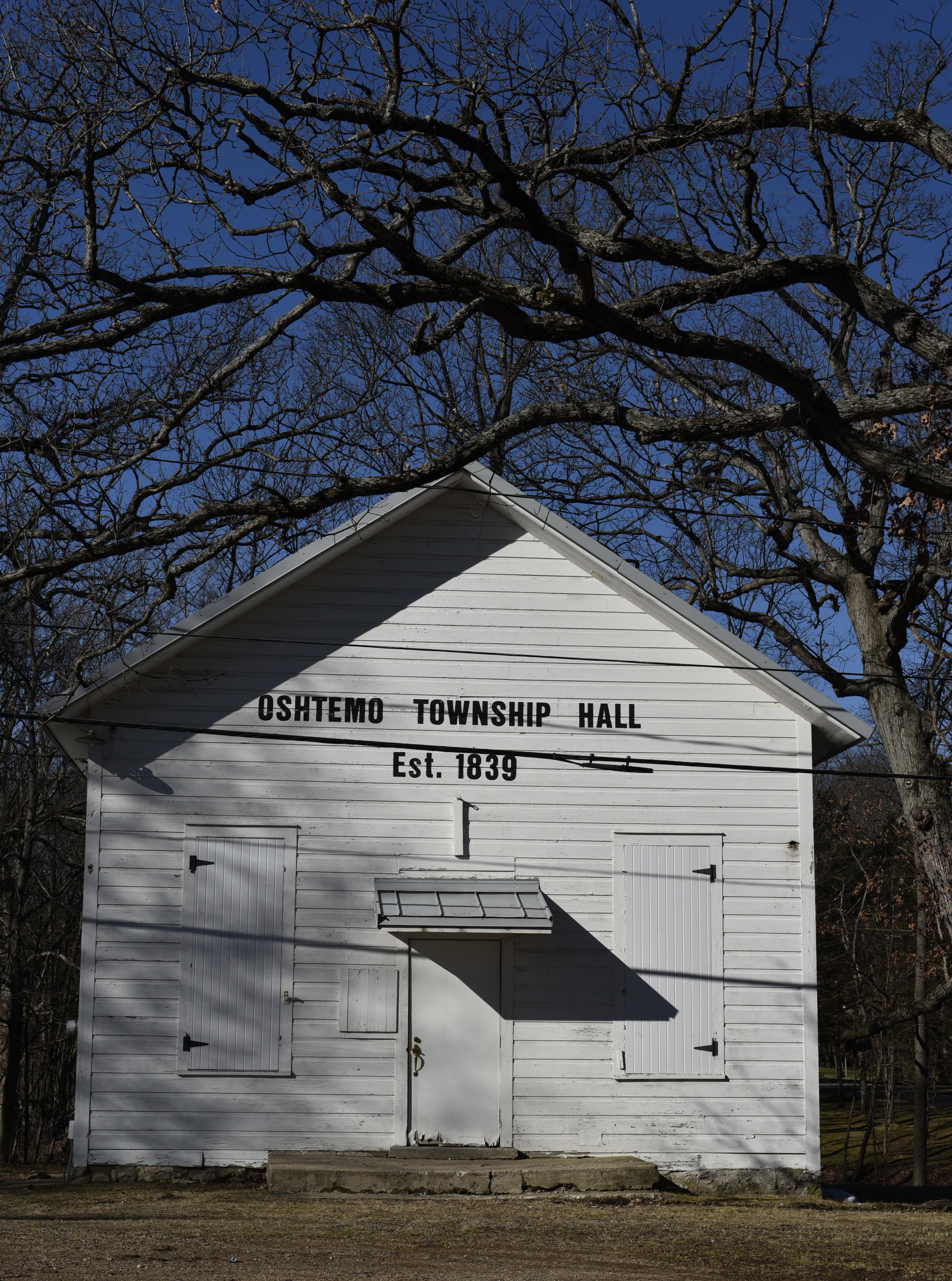

- Location within Michigan Location within the United States
- Interactive map
- Location: 10 S. Eighth St., Oshtemo Charter Township, Michigan
- Coordinates: 42°17′19″N 85°41′15″W
- Area: 0.5 acres (0.20 ha)
- Built: 1877
- Architectural style: Late Victorian
- NRHP reference No.: 04000459
- Added to NRHP: May 19, 2004

The Oshtemo Town Hall is a governmental building located at 10 South Eighth Street in Oshtemo Charter Township, Michigan. It was listed on the National Register of Historic Places in 2004.

== History ==
European settlers first came to Oshtemo Charter Township in 1830. The township itself was organized in 1839, with the first township meeting taking place in a church that year. The area was primarily agricultural, and population grew slowly. By 1870, there were about 2000 people in the township, a figure which was not substantially increased until after World War II. In 1877, the township purchased a half-acre of land near the geographic center, and constructed this town hall to house its governmental operations. The hall also served as a community gathering place, hosting local activities such as Sunday school classes, theatrical productions, and community dances. The township used the hall until 1968, when a replacement building was erected.

== Description ==
The Oshtemo Town Hall is a rectangular wood building measuring twenty-four feet wide by forty feet deep. The building is clad with white-painted Dutch lap siding and sits on a rubble stone foundation. It has a front-gabled roof of moderately steep pitch. The front of the building holds a central door covered with a shed-roof overhang and flanked by a pair of nine over nine double-hung, wood sash windows, measuring about eight feet tall and two and one-half feet wide. Each side wall contains three identical windows spaced equally along the wall. Two additional fixed six-paned sash windows are located about four feet above the foundation on one side.
