= Lee Paper Company Mill Complex =

- U.S. National Register of Historic Places
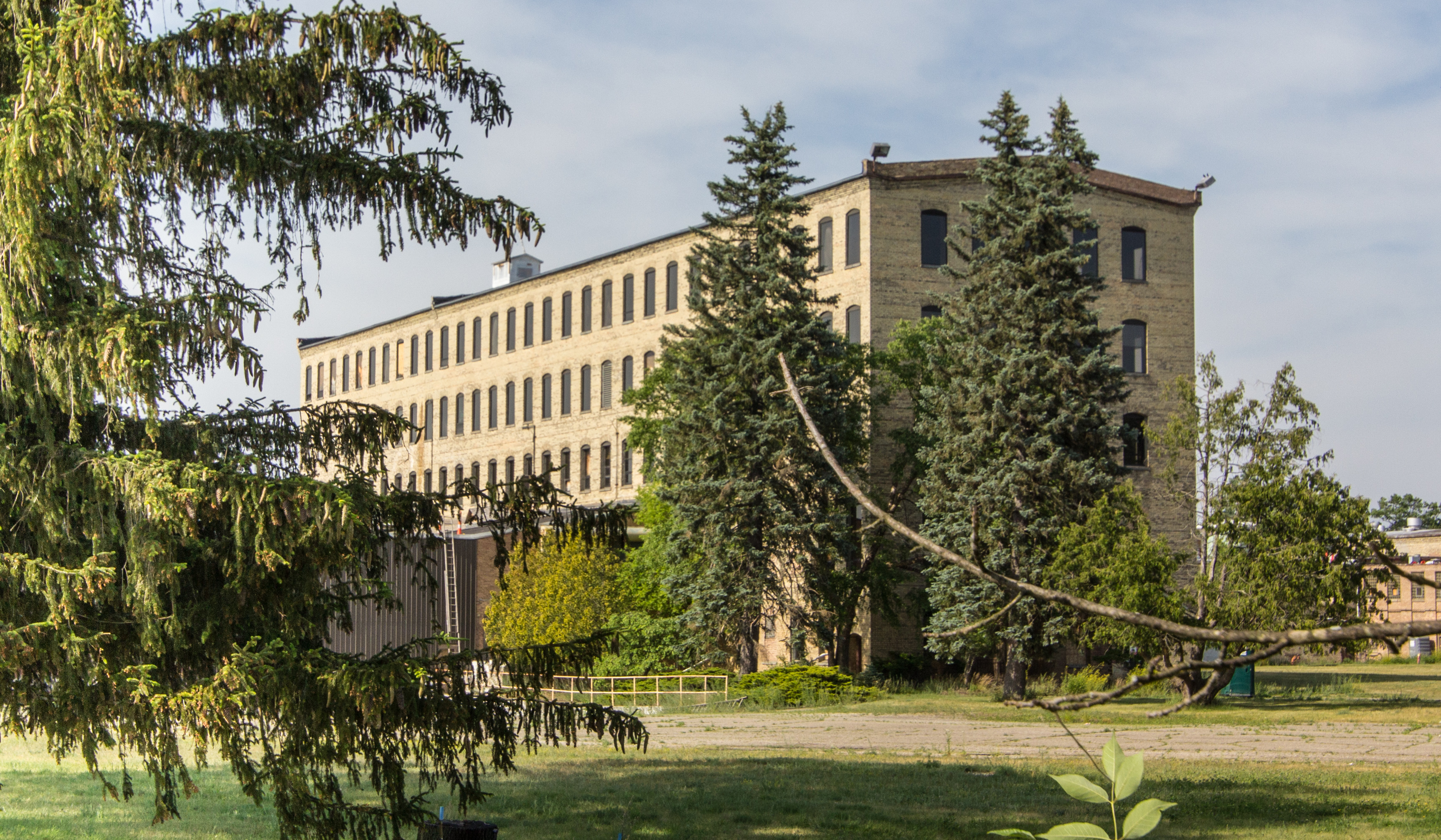
- Interactive map
- Location: 300 W. Highway St., Vicksburg, Michigan
- Coordinates: 42°06′51″N 85°32′16″W
- Area: 30 acres (12 ha)
- Built: 1904
- Built by: Charles A. Moses Company
- Architect: Daniel J. Albertson
- NRHP reference No.: 16000524
- Added to NRHP: August 11, 2016

The Lee Paper Company Mill Complex is a former factory located at 300 West Highway Street in Vicksburg, Michigan. It was listed on the National Register of Historic Places in 2016. In 2017, a mixed-use development project was announced for the property, to be renamed The Mill at Vicksburg.

== History ==
The paper industry was established in the Kalamazoo River Valley in 1866, with the opening of the first paper mill in the area. The industry expanded through the valley, and by the end of the century was a major contributor to the economy of the region. In 1903 George E. Bardeen, who owned another paper mill in the area, partnered with investors Fred Lee, William Howard, and Charles Seitz to propose the establishment of a new paper mill in Vicksburg. The village supported the idea, and later the year the men incorporated the Lee Paper Company, with Frederick Lee as the major shareholder and president. The company hired Daniel J. Albertson as the engineer and architect of the firm, and the Charles A. Moses Company of Chicago to construct the mill buildings.

Construction on the mill started in 1904, and production in the new facility began in early 1905. The company struggled during its first years, but starting in 1911 hit a period of prosperity, helped along by the World War I economic boom in the later 1910s. However, an economic slowdown in the early 1920s, and the onset of the Great Depression in the 1930s, nearly ruined the company. However, better conditions in the later 1930s, and the spike in business from World War II, meant that the company could expand operations. This continued until 1959, when the Lee Paper Company merged with Simpson Timber Company to form the Simpson Lee Paper Company. More mergers followed, as the company was absorbed into the Simpson Paper Company in 1971, and then the Fox River Paper Company in 1996. The mill continued to operate until 2001.

After 2001, the mill property was purchased by a private group, the Mill of South County LLC. However, the property remained vacant, and Kalamazoo County government acquired the property in 2013 in a "tax reversion" action. In 2017, a mixed-use development project was announced for the property, to be renamed The Mill at Vicksburg. The first portions of the redevelopment are expected to be completed in 2022 and it is currently the site of an artist's residency.

== Description ==
The Lee Paper Company Mill Complex consists of thirty separate buildings, most of them interconnected, sited on a 30 acres (12 ha) parcel. Fifteen of the buildings, which contain the majority of the square footage, contribute to the historic character of the site. The buildings date from 1904 to 1990, with the majority built during the original construction of the mill in 1904. The buildings range from two to five stories in height, and are mostly brick, with some concrete block and steel buildings intermingled.

The oldest of the buildings have load-bearing brick walls with low gable roofs, with slow-burning timber frame construction on the interior. The walls are of cream-colored brick, with corbelling along the roofline. The windows are large multi-light (originally double-hung 12-over-12 or 16-over-16) wood units in jack arch openings with concrete sills. Many windows have been subsequently filled in.
