= Vicksburg Historic District =

- U.S. National Register of Historic Places
- U.S. Historic district
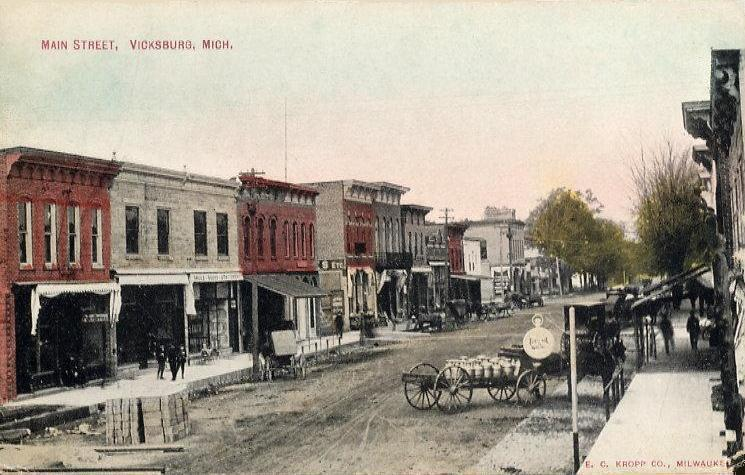
- Main Street, Vicksburg, Michigan; from a 1909 postcard
- Interactive map
- Location: East Highway, North and South Main, East and West Maple, East and West Park, East and West Prairie, East and West South, and West Washington Sts.; North and South Kalamazoo and South Michigan Aves; East and West Liberty Lns., Vicksburg, Michigan
- Coordinates: 42°7′12″N 85°31′56″W
- Architectural style: Italianate, Second Empire, Queen Anne, Colonial Revival, Greek Revival
- NRHP reference No.: 100007671
- Added to NRHP: April 28, 2022

The Vicksburg Historic District is mixed commercial and residential historic district located primarily along Main Street, Michigan Avenue, and Kalamazoo Avenue, and adjacent portions of Prairie, Washington, Maple, South, and Park Streets in Vicksburg, Michigan. It was listed on the National Register of Historic Places in 2022.

== History ==
White settlers first arrived in the Vicksburg area in the early 1830s, and in 1849 the village was first platted. By 1861, Vicksburg had multiple businesses established in its downtown. Growth increased starting in 1870 with the arrival of the Grand Rapids and Indiana Railroad. Through the rest of the 19th century, the downtown commercial area expanded with the addition of hotels, banks, grocers, and other businesses, as well as social organizations, churches, and schools. At the same time, the residential area of Vicksburg expanded, with many Victorian houses built before 1900.

After the turn of the century, the Lee Paper Company opened a factory in the village, increasing the population from under 1000 in 1900 to over 1600 in 1910. However, the Great Depression had a substantial impact on local businesses, with many closing and some buildings demolished during the 1930s. The population of Vicksburg in 1940 was not much more than it had been in 1910. The village began growing again in the 1950s, but as the 20th century continued, the greater mobility of the populace created competition from businesses in nearby Kalamazoo and Portage, causing Vicksburg's downtown to go into decline. However, since the turn of the 21st century, the village is again growing, with over 1000 more residents in 2019 than 2000.

== Description ==
The Vicksburg Historic District includes 146 primary buildings (and 73 outbuildings) that contribute to the historic character of the district, and 27 additional non-contributing structures. The district includes Vicksburg's commercial downtown, located near the northern edge of the district, and residential neighborhoods to the south.

The residences in the district vary in size and architectural style. There are many large, highly ornamented Italianate, Queen Anne, and Colonial Revival style houses built in the later part of the nineteenth century and the early twentieth century, as well as a small number of earlier Greek Revival and Gothic Revival houses and later American Craftsman houses. The most prominent of these houses are located along South Main Street, South Michigan Avenue, and South Kalamazoo Avenue. Many other homes are modest vernacular versions of these styles, as well as Minimal Traditional-style homes, Ranch houses, and homes with Modern detailing constructed.

The commercial structures are primarily located along the 100 block of North Main Street, 100-200 blocks of South Main Street, 100 block of North Kalamazoo Avenue, and 100 blocks of East and West Prairie streets. These buildings primarily date from the late nineteenth and early twentieth centuries, and are substantially vernacular and Italianate-style buildings. Most are built of brick with and minimal detailing, although there are a small number of frame, stone, and concrete block structures in the district. The district additionally includes some churches, a post office, a library, and schools.

== Gallery ==
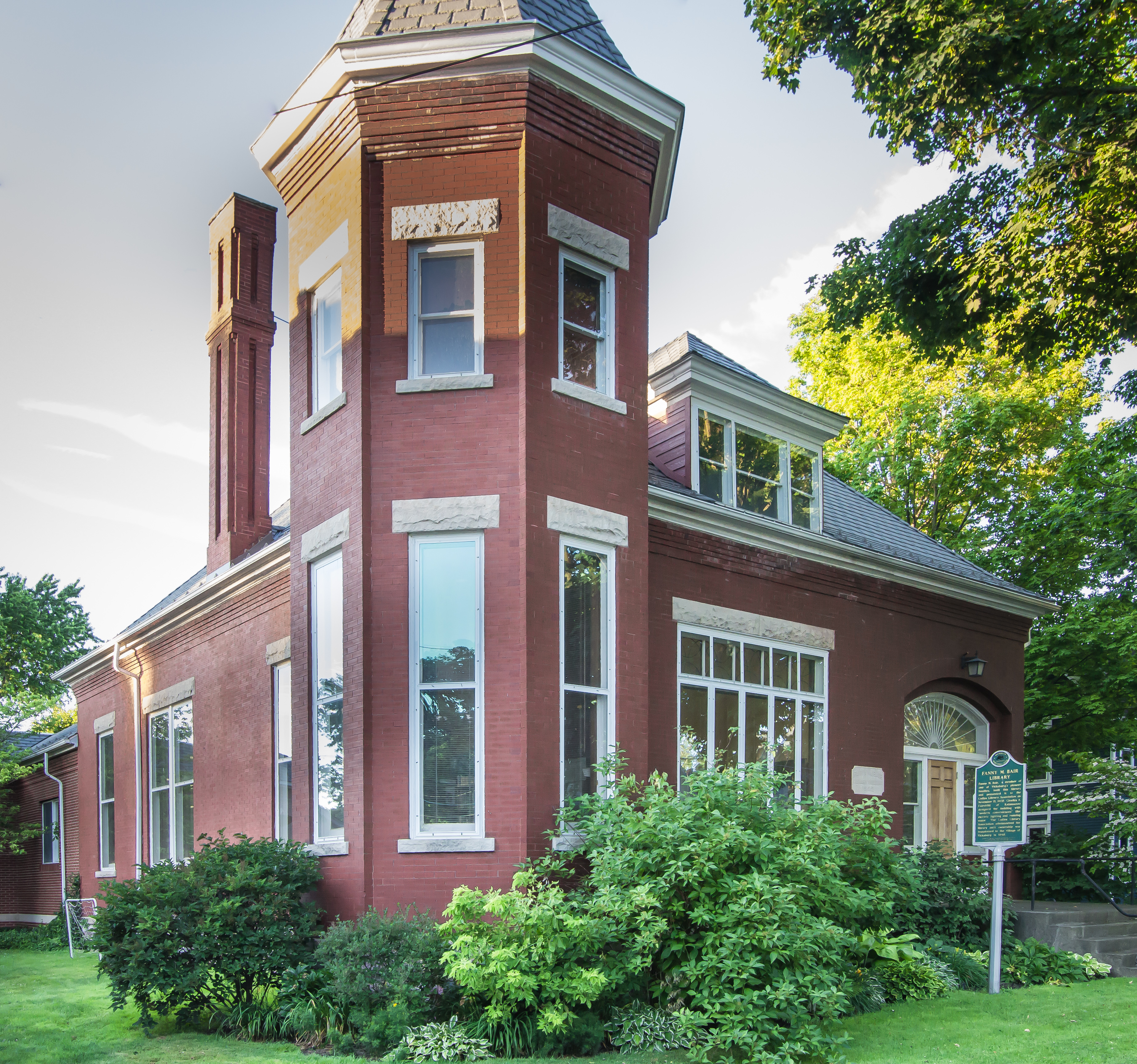
Fanny Library

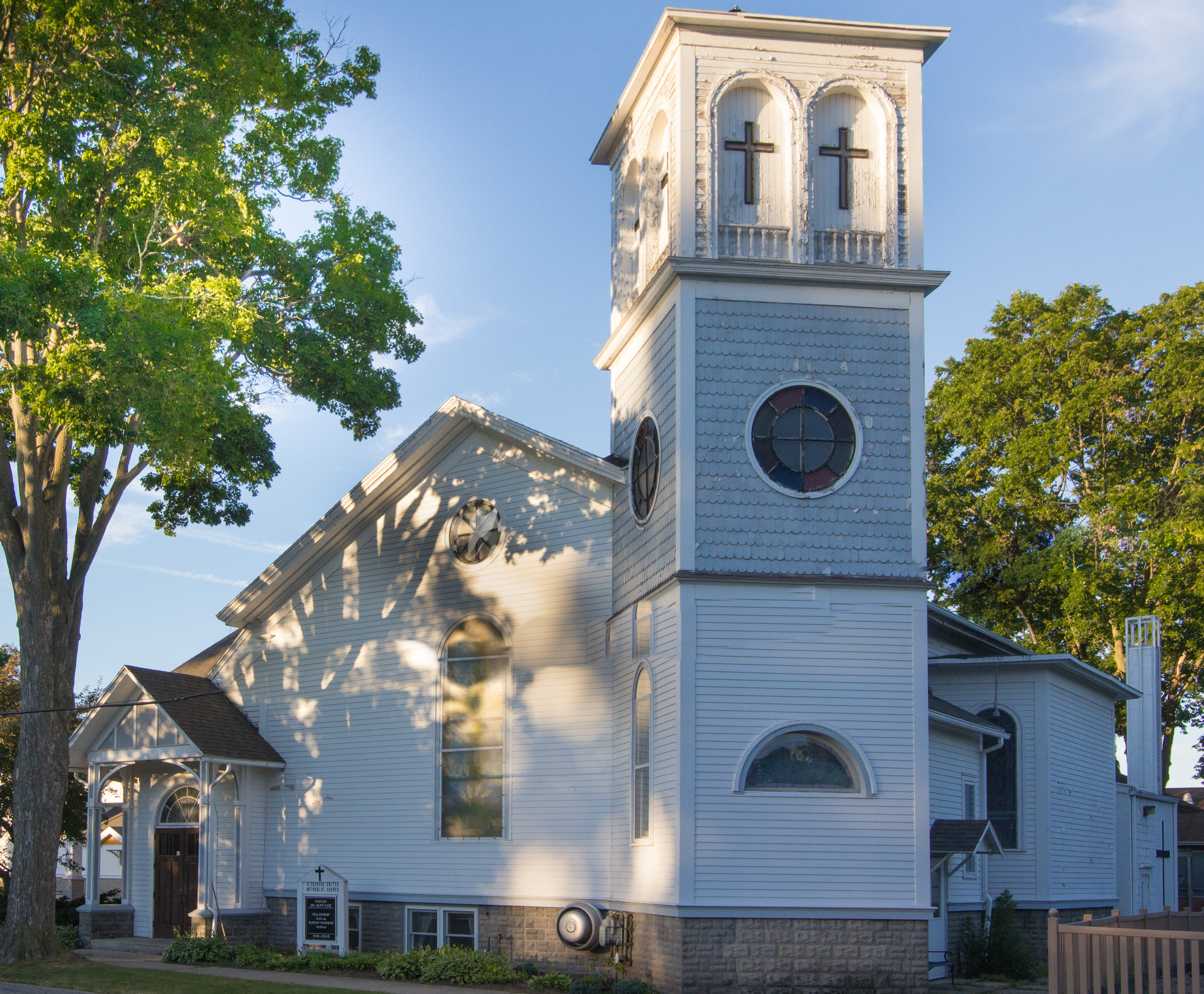
Vicksburg Methodist Episcopal Church
