= Bronson Park Historic District =

- U.S. National Register of Historic Places
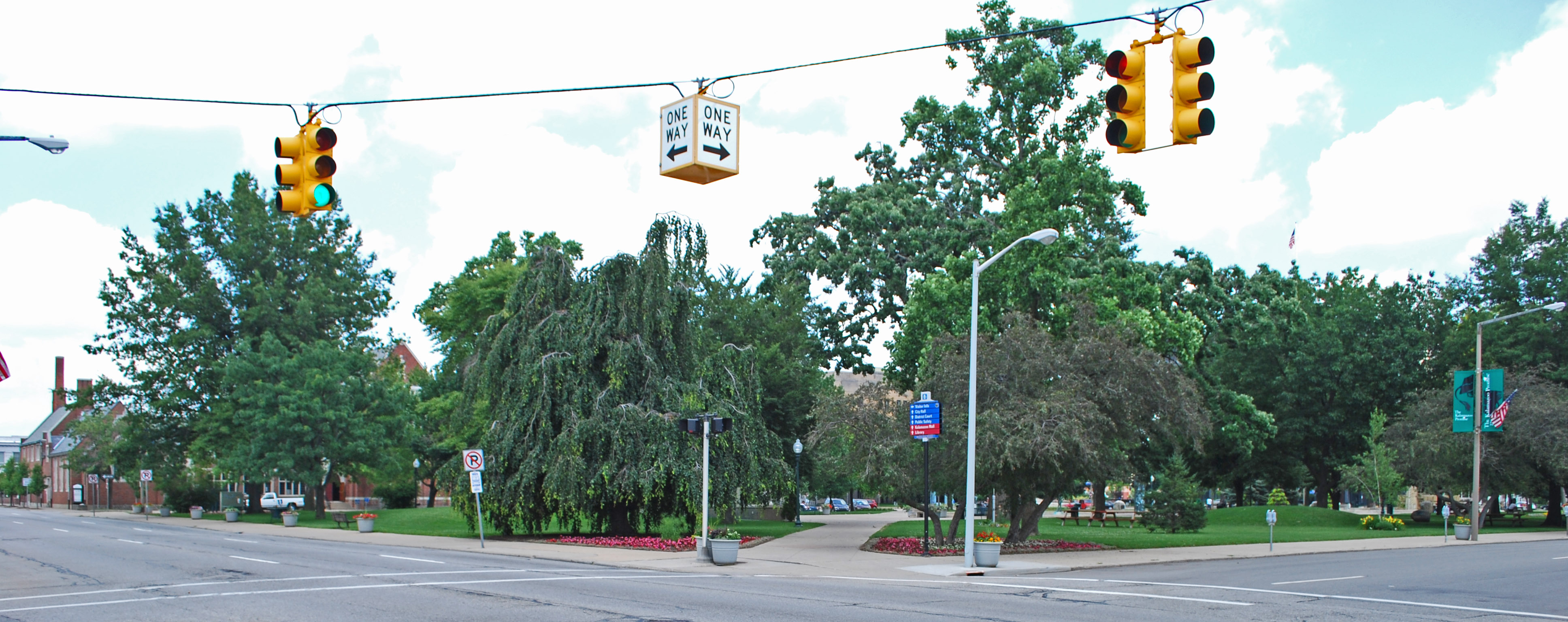
- Bronson Park
- Interactive map
- Location: Roughly bounded by S. Rose, S. Park, W. Lovell, and W. Michigan Aves., Kalamazoo, Michigan
- Coordinates: 42°17′24″N 85°35′10″W
- Area: 16.6 acres (6.7 ha)
- Architect: Multiple
- Architectural style: Art Deco, Mixed (more Than 2 Styles From Different Periods)
- MPS: Kalamazoo MRA
- NRHP reference No.: 83000855
- Added to NRHP: May 27, 1983

Bronson Park Historic District is a historic district in Kalamazoo, Michigan, consisting of Bronson Park and the surrounding government, religious, and civic buildings. It is roughly bounded by South Rose, South Park, West Lovell, and West Michigan Avenues. The district was listed on the National Register of Historic Places in 1983.

== History ==
The area around Bronson Park was platted by Kalamazoo's founder, Titus Bronson, in 1831. Bronson Park itself, then divided in two by Church Street, was donated by Bronson to the city, with the indication that half was to be used as a "jail square" and the other half as an "academy square." The squares directly to the north were designated as "church square" and "courthouse square." For some time, the four squares served their intended purpose, as churches were constructed, Kalamazoo became the county seat, Kalamazoo's first jail was built on jail square, and a branch of the University of Michigan was opened on academy square. However, within a couple of decades, the jail and academy were moved and Church Street was vacated to join the two squares. For many years, what is now Bronson Park remained unimproved cow pasture.

In 1876, the previously unnamed land was renamed "Bronson Park," and the area was landscaped, with a fountain placed in the park center. As Kalamazoo grew, the park and the neighboring courthouse and church squares remained the civic heart of the city. The first courthouse, constructed in 1837, was built on courthouse square, as were subsequent 1885 and 1935-37 buildings. Churches constructed in the district include the First Methodist church (dating from 1833), the First Congregational (1835), First Baptist (1836), St. Luke's Episcopal (1837), First Presbyterian (1849), First Reformed (1850), and the First Church of Christ, Scientist. The district also includes the Ladies Library Association Building, built in 1878, the YWCA Building, the 1931 Kalamazoo City Hall and the 1938 Federal Building.

== Description ==
Bronson Park Historic District contains Bronson Park itself, the city's public square, as well as seventeen surrounding structures. These structures are some of Kalamazoo's oldest and most architecturally significant governmental, civic, and religious structures. These include the following:

- 302 Academy Street - First Reformed Church
- 431 Academy Street - Harry B. Hoyt House
- 226 W. Lovell Street - Austin-Sill House
- 247 W. Lovell Street - St. Luke's Episcopal Church
- 227 W. Michigan Avenue - Kalamazoo County Building
- 315 W. Michigan Avenue - First Baptist Church
- 410 W. Michigan Avenue - Federal Building
- 129 S. Park Street - First Congregational Church
- 212 S. Perk Street - United Methodist Church
- 329 S. Park Street - Civic Auditorium
- 333 S. Perk Street - Ladies Library Assoc. Building
- 219 W. South Street - Lawrence House/Park Club
- 241 W. South Street - City Hall
- 321 W. South Street - First Presbyterian Church
- 414 W. South Street - First Church of Christ, Scientist
- 211 S. Rose Street - Y.W.C.A. Building
- 340 S. Rose Street - Prange Building

== Gallery ==
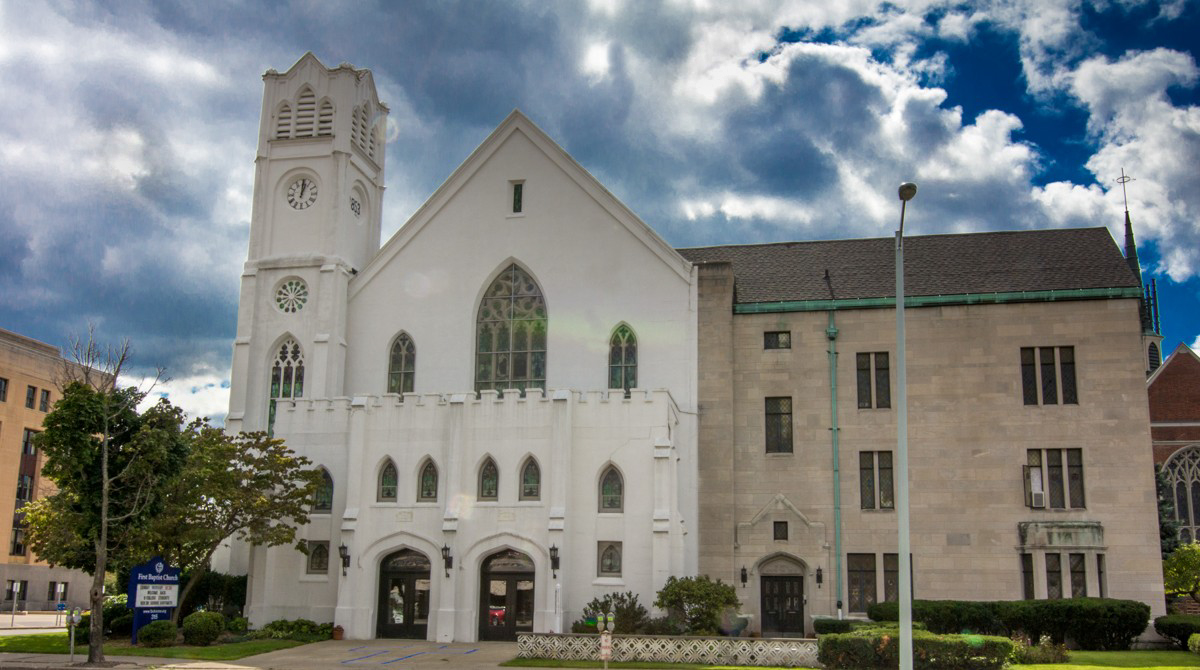
First Baptist Church

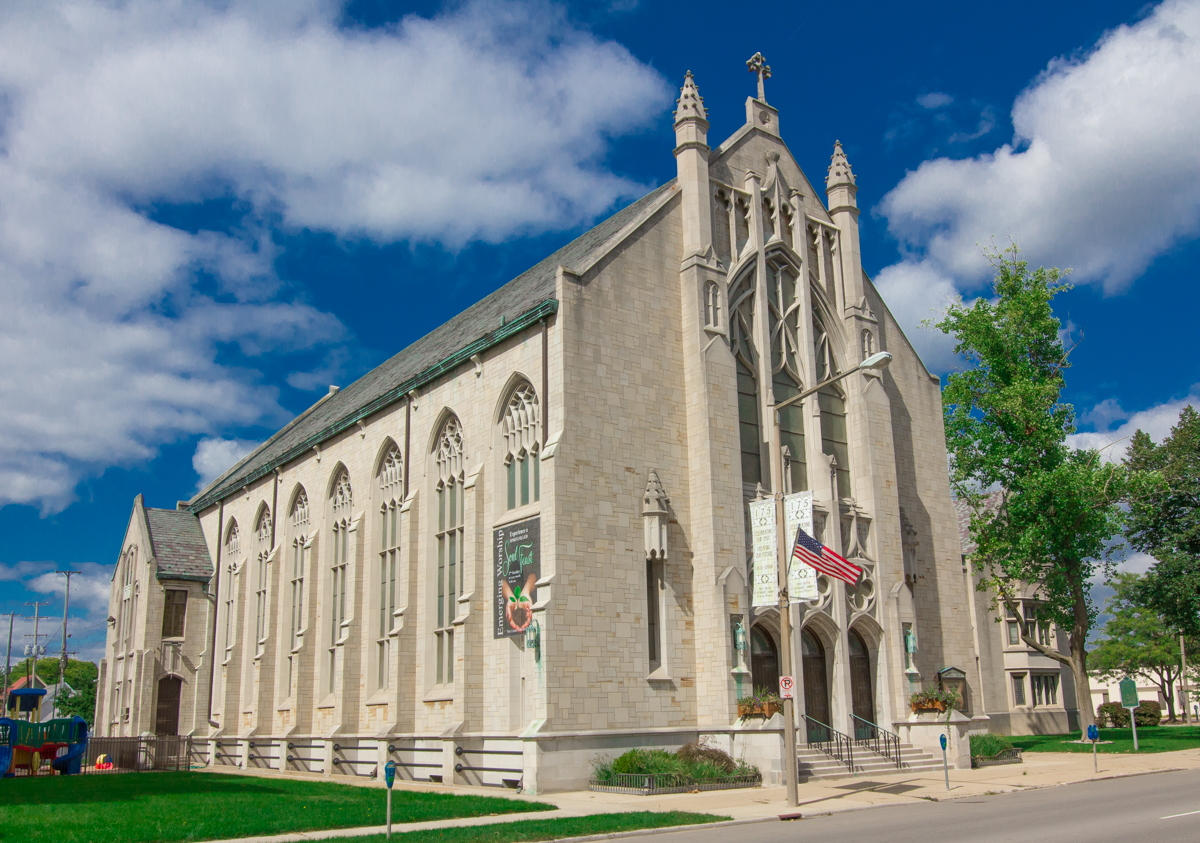
First United Methodist Church

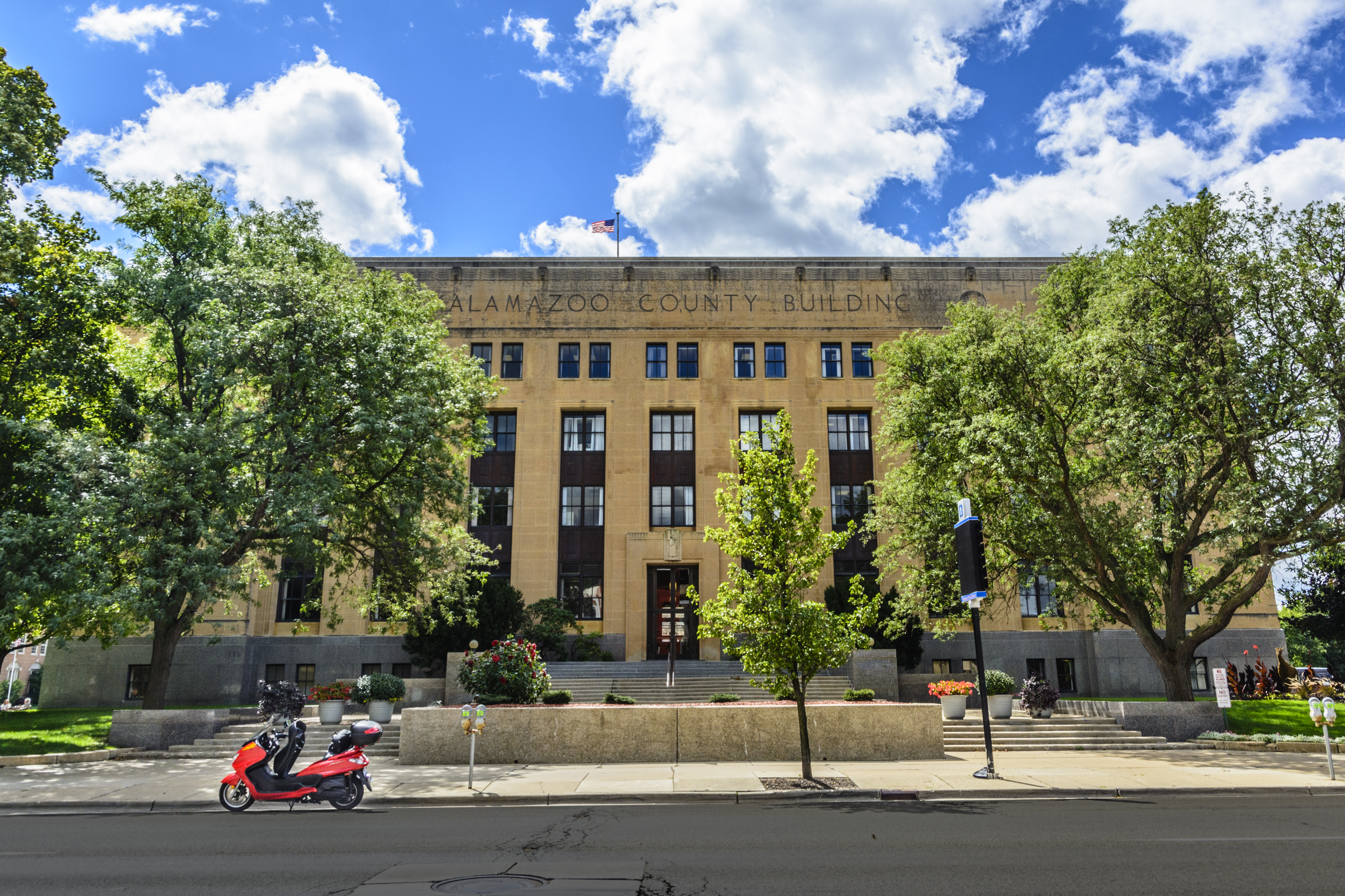
Kalamazoo County Building

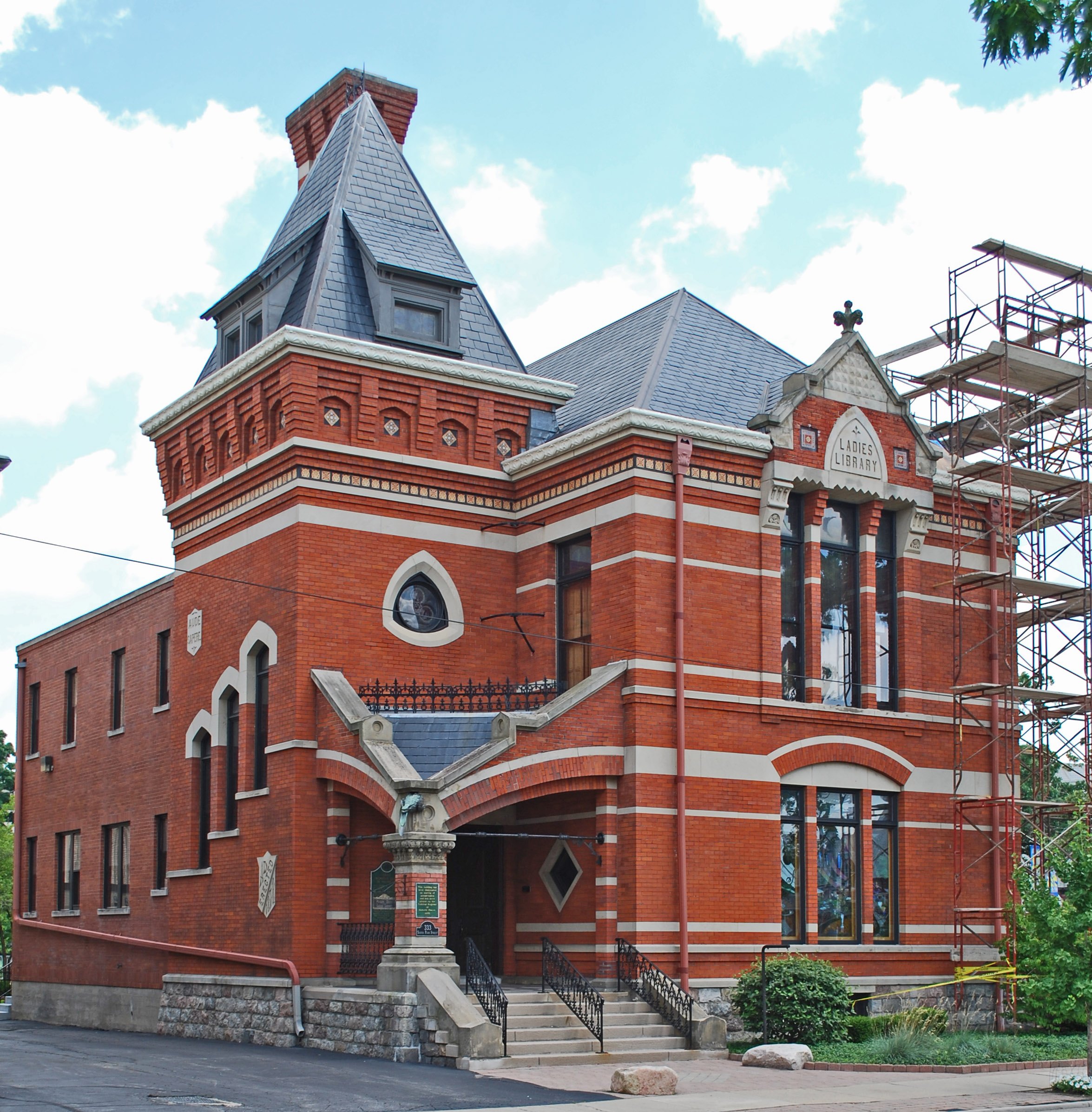
Ladies Library Association Building

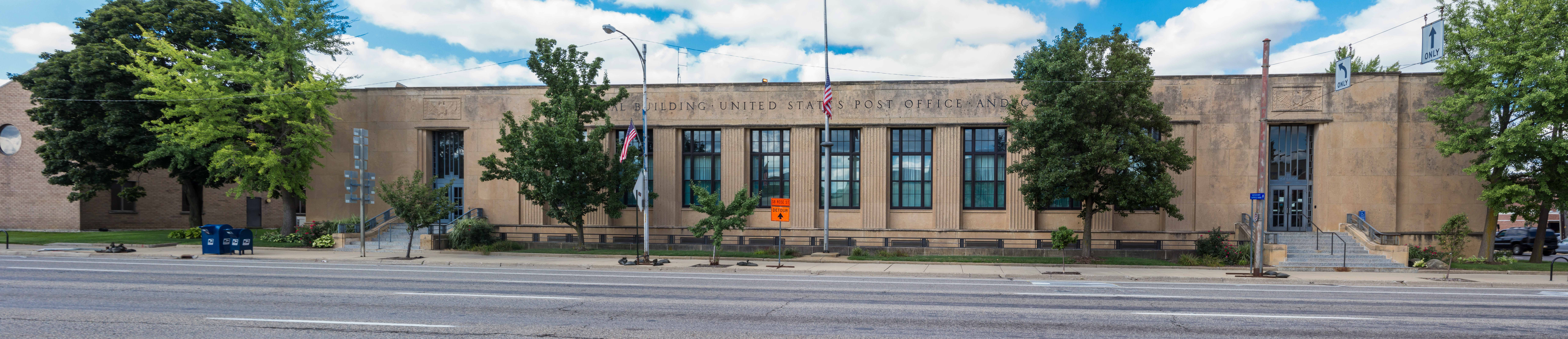
Federal Building (former post office)
