= Fitch (surname) =

- Fitch family coat of arms
- Pronunciation: Fitch

Origin
- Origin: Old French
- Region of origin: England

Other names
- Variant forms: Fytche, Ffytche, Fitche, Fitcher, Fittje, and Fitchy

Fitch is a family name of Old French origin. Like most ancient surnames, there are a number of possible origins to the name. It may originate from the Old French word fissell meaning "an iron-pointed implement". It may also derive from William de Gernon who inherited the barony of Stansted Mountfitchet in Essex, England and took the surname "de Montifitchet". His descendants eventually shortened the name first to "Fitche" and then to "Fitch".

Related names include Fitchet, Fitchell, Fitchen and Fitchett, as well as others. Earliest records show the name and derivatives occurring from the 12th century onwards. It may also have been used as a personal name.

== People ==
=== In arts and entertainment ===
==== Writers ====
- Brian T. Fitch (1935–2023), French-Canadian non-fiction author
- Clyde Fitch (1865–1909), American playwright
- George Helgesen Fitch (1877–1915), American author, humorist, and journalist
- Janet Fitch, American author
- Lucy Fitch Perkins, (1865–1937), American children's author
- Noël Riley Fitch, author
- Sheree Fitch, Canadian children's author

==== In other arts ====
- Albert Fitch Bellows (1829–1883), American landscape painter
- Alice Underwood Fitch (1862-1936), American painter
- Graham Fitch, pianist
- John Fitch (computer scientist) (born 1945), computer scientist, mathematician and composer
- Niles Fitch (born 2001), American actor
- Rodney Fitch, English designer

=== In business ===
- Benjamin Franklin Fitch (1877-1956), author of the concept of containers in the US before the Second World War
- Ezra Fitch, New York lawyer and cofounder of Abercrombie & Fitch, a clothing company
- George Ashmore Fitch, YMCA Administrative Director
- George B. Fitch, American businessman, politician, and Olympic organizer
- John Fitch (inventor) (1743–1798), early American inventor, built the first steamboat in the United States in 1786
- John Knowles Fitch (1880–1943), founder of Fitch Ratings, Ltd
- John Thomas Fitch, father and son of J. T. Fitch & Son, drapers of Adelaide, South Australia
- Ralph Fitch (1550 – 1611), British merchant-explorer of India and Burma

=== In government, military, and politics ===
==== United States ====
- Alva Revista Fitch (1907–1989), U.S. Army Lieutenant General
- Asa Fitch (politician) (1765–1843), US Congress representative
- Ashbel P. Fitch (1848–1904), New York politician
- Aubrey Fitch (1883–1978), U.S. Navy admiral
- Charles C. Fitch (1842–1899), Michigan state representative
- Chauncey Fitch Cleveland (1799–1887), US politician
- Ferris S. Fitch Jr. (1853–1920), Michigan Superintendent of Public Instruction
- George B. Fitch (1948–2014), American businessman, politician, and Olympic organizer
- Graham N. Fitch (1809–1892), US Representative and Senator
- Jabez W. Fitch (1823–1884), Democratic lieutenant-governor of Ohio from 1878 to 1880
- LeRoy Fitch (1835–1875), officer during the American Civil War
- Thomas Fitch (governor) (IV) (1699–1774), governor of the Connecticut Colony
- Thomas Fitch V (1725–1795), representative from Norwalk to the Connecticut House of Representatives, traditionally believed to be the original "Yankee Doodle Dandy."
- Thomas Fitch (politician) (1838–1923), United States Representative from Nevada

==== Other countries ====
- Alan Fitch (1915–1985), British Labour Party politician
- Bruce Fitch, New Brunswick, Canada politician

=== In science and academia ===
- Asa Fitch, American entomologist
- Frederic Brenton Fitch, American logician and inventor of Fitch-style calculus
- Henry Sheldon Fitch, American herpetologist
- James Marston Fitch, historic preservationist
- John Fitch (classicist), classical scholar
- John Fitch (computer scientist) (born 1945), computer scientist, mathematician and composer
- John A. Fitch (1881–1959), writer and professor of labor relations
- John Nugent Fitch (1840–1927), botanical illustrator
- Joshua Girling Fitch (1824–1903), English educationalist
- Marc Fitch, English historian and philanthropist
- Val Logsdon Fitch, Nobel Prize-winning nuclear physicist
- W. Tecumseh Fitch, evolutionary psychologist
- Walter Hood Fitch (1817–1892), Scottish botanical artist
- Walter M. Fitch (1929–2011), American evolutionary biologist

=== In sport ===
- Alfred Fitch, American Olympian
- Alison Fitch, New Zealand Olympian
- Bill Fitch (1932–2022), American basketball coach
- Gerald Fitch, American basketball player
- Harrison Fitch, American basketball player
- Horatio Fitch, American Olympian
- John Fitch (racing driver) (1917–2012), racing driver, inventor of innovative safety devices and descendant of John Fitch (inventor)
- Jon Fitch, American mixed martial arts fighter
- Joyce Fitch, Australian tennis player
- Nathaniel Fitch (born 1958), former heavyweight boxer
- Zarnell Fitch (born 1983), American football player

=== In other fields ===
- Charles Fitch, American preacher
- Dennis E. Fitch, American commercial airline pilot
- Ed Fitch (born 1937), occult author and Wiccan High Priest
- Henry D. Fitch (1767–1849), early settler of San Diego, California
- James P. Fitch, notable in the early history of the Boy Scouts of America
- John Fitch, Massachusetts settler for whom Fitchburg, Massachusetts is named
- John Fitch (racing driver) (1917–2012), racing driver, inventor of innovative safety devices and descendant of John Fitch (inventor)
- John H. Fitch, namesake of YMCA Camp Fitch in Springfield, Pennsylvania
- Ralph Fitch, British merchant-explorer of India and Burma
- Thomas Fitch (settler) (I) (1612–1704), founding settler of Norwalk, Connecticut

== See also ==
- Fitch (disambiguation)
