= List of Michigan State Historic Sites in Kalamazoo County =

Location of Kalamazoo County in Michigan

The following is a list of Michigan State Historic Sites in Kalamazoo County, Michigan. Sites marked with a dagger (†) are also listed on the National Register of Historic Places in Kalamazoo County, Michigan.

== Current listings ==
Name	Image	Location	City	Listing date
A. U. V. Auditorium (demolished)	AUV Auditorium	137 Portage	Kalamazoo	December 14, 1976
Fanny M. Bair Library		120 West Maple Street	Vicksburg	December 17, 1987
Barn Theatre		13319 Augusta Drive (Highway M-96)	Augusta vicinity	August 12, 1983
Booth-Dunham Farm†		6059 South 9th Street	Kalamazoo	August 29, 1996
Luther Burroughs House		8932 East H Avenue	Kalamazoo	February 21, 1991
Community Library		8951 Park Street	Richland	September 24, 1984
Comstock Township		2 S, 10 W	Comstock Township	March 23, 1965
Cooper's Island, Big Island on Prairie Ronde		1/4 mile west of West Eliza off US-131	Schoolcraft	October 17, 1974
William S. Delano House†	Delano Homestead	555 West E Avenue, between Douglas and N Westnedge avenues	Kalamazoo vicinity	November 21, 1975
Eagle Heights		3700 Gull Lake East Drive	Ross Township	February 15, 1990
East Hall†	Western Michigan University East Hall	Oakland Drive, Western Michigan University campus	Kalamazoo	October 9, 1978
Thomas B. Eldred House	Thomas B. Eldred House	6378 S 44th Street	Climax	October 12, 1990
Daniel B. Eldred House	Daniel b. Eldred House	216 East Maple	Climax	September 7, 1989
Female Seminary, Michigan (Demolished)		Gull Road (near St. Mary's Catholic Church)	Kalamazoo	August 23, 1956
First Baptist Church	First Baptist Church-Kalamazoo	315 West Michigan Avenue	Kalamazoo	January 16, 1976
First Congregational Church	First Congregtional Church-Galesburg	22 Church Street	Galesburg	January 18, 1980
First Congregational Church of Cooper	First Congregational Church of Cooper	8071 Douglas Ave, between C and D avenues	Kalamazoo	August 21, 1987
First Consolidated School			Kalamazoo	August 18, 1969
The First Presbyterian Church		8047 Park Street	Richland	October 2, 1980
First United Methodist Church	First United Methodist Church-Kalamazoo	212 South Park Street	Kalamazoo	June 30, 1988
Grand Rapids and Indiana Railroad Depot	Grand Rapids and Indiana Railroad	402 East Michigan Avenue	Kalamazoo	March 2, 1976
Festus Hall House	Festus Hall House	114 South Main Street	Climax	August 12, 1983
Harris Family Burial Site Commemorative Designation		SE corner of 11th Street and Parkview Rd (M Ave)	Kalamazoo	July 26, 1973
Haymarket Historic District† Informational Designation		258–260 East Michigan Avenue	Kalamazoo	2001
Henderson Park-West Main Hill Historic District Commemorative Designation†		Henderson Park at the intersection of Grand Avenue and West Market Street	Kalamazoo	January 17, 2002
Amos B. Hill House	Amos B. Hill House	6737 Texas Drive	Texas Township	May 10, 1990
Indian Fields (Potawatamie Village) Informational Designation		Mounted on the Kalamazoo Municipal Airport Terminal building	Kalamazoo	August 23, 1956
Edward Israel Arctic Pioneer Informational Designation		Mountain Home Cemetery, bounded by Main St, Ingleside Terrace, and Forbes St	Kalamazoo	1972
Kalamazoo Celery Informational Designation		Intersection of Crosstown Parkway, Balch and Park streets	Kalamazoo	January 19, 1957
Kalamazoo College Informational Designation		Located across from Hoben Hall, in the Main Quadrangle on the Kalamazoo College Campus, 1200 Academy Street	Kalamazoo	September 25, 1956
Kalamazoo College/Michigan and Huron Institute Informational Designation		Corner of Walnut St & Westnedge Ave	Kalamazoo	September 24, 1982
Kalamazoo Region Informational Designation		Rest Area, westbound I-94 near Galesburg	Kalamazoo vicinity	July 17, 1961
Kalamazoo School Case of 1874 Informational Designation		714 South Westnedge Avenue	Kalamazoo	September 17, 1957
Silas W. Kendall House†		7540 Stadium Drive	Oshtemo vicinity	June 15, 1989
Ladies Library Association Building†	LadiesLibraryAssociationBuildingKalamazooMI	333 South Park Street	Kalamazoo	April 15, 1961
Lincoln at Kalamazoo Informational Site	Lincoln at Kalamazoo	Bronson Park, bounded by Park, Academy, Rose, and South streets	Kalamazoo	July 19, 1956
Michigan Asylum for the Insane	Kalamazoo State Hospital	1210 Oakland Drive, between Wheaton Avenue and Howard Street	Kalamazoo	March 12, 1963
Michigan Central Depot†	Michigan Central Depot-Kalamazoo	459 North Burdick Street	Kalamazoo	February 21, 1975
Michigan State Grange / Women In The Michigan Grange Commemorative Designation	Women in the Michigan Grange	NW corner of Water and Burdick Street,	Kalamazoo	August 26, 1999
Michigan Statesman and St. Joseph Chronicle Newspapers Informational Designation		401 South Burdick Street	Kalamazoo	April 28, 1987
Hiram Moore Combine Informational Designation			Climax	August 23, 1956
Nazareth College Informational Designation		Gull Road	Kalamazoo	January 16, 1962
Park Theatre	Park Theatre	108 Clinton Street	Augusta	July 15, 1999
Archie and Grace Loveland Peer House	rchie Loveland Peer House	186 Worden	Comstock	April 20, 1995
Peninsula Building		200 East Michigan Avenue	Kalamazoo	March 18, 1982
Pioneer Cemetery Informational Site		South Westnedge Avenue, between Wheaton and Minor Avenues	Kalamazoo	March 24, 1960
Portage District No. 8 School	Portage District No. 8 School	7336 Garden Lane	Portage	September 24, 1992
Governor Epaphroditus Ransom Informational Site		401 South Burdick Street	Kalamazoo	May 21, 1985
Removal of Indians (1821-1840) Commemorative Designation		New York Central Depot, 459 N Burdick Street	Kalamazoo	August 23, 1956
Rural Free Delivery Monument	Rural Free Delivery Monument	44th Street (Main St), N of Maple St	Climax	February 18, 1956
Schoolcraft Ladies Library		163 Hayward Street	Schoolcraft	October 17, 1996
Scotts Mill		8300 S. 35th Street	Village of Scotts	September 15, 1975
Andrew J. Shakespeare Jr. House		3605 Portage Avenue	Kalamazoo	November 1, 1988
South Street Historic District†		W South Street, between Oakland Dr and Westnedge Ave	Kalamazoo	June 16, 1972
State Hospital Gatehouse†	State Hospital Gatehouse	1006 Oakland Drive	Kalamazoo	February 11, 1972
Stuart Neighborhood/Henderson Park Historic District		Roughly bounded by MCRR tracks, North St, Douglas Ave, and W Main St	Kalamazoo	November 7, 1977
Charles E. Stuart House†	Stuart House	427 Stuart Avenue	Kalamazoo	November 18, 1965
Dr. Nathan M. Thomas House†		613 East Cass Street	Schoolcraft	October 29, 1971
William E. Upjohn / Upjohn Company Informational Designation		Corner of Henrietta and Lovell streets	Kalamazoo	July 17, 1986
Vickers' Mill Site Informational Site		215 West Prairie Street	Vicksburg	October 9, 2000
Vicksburg Methodist Episcopal Church		217 South Main Street	Vicksburg	May 21, 1985
David S. Walbridge Informational Site		202 South Kalamazoo Mall	Kalamazoo	January 16, 1976
Western State Normal School Historic District†		Roughly bounded by Stadium Drive, Oliver and Davis streets	Kalamazoo	January 19, 1957

== See also ==
- National Register of Historic Places listings in Kalamazoo County, Michigan

== Sources ==
- Historic Sites Online – Kalamazoo County. Michigan State Housing Developmental Authority. Accessed March 6, 2011.
