= Fitch =

Fitch may refer to:

== Family name ==
- Fitch (surname), family name of English origin

== Places ==
In Antarctica:

- Fitch Glacier

In Australia:

- Mount Fitch, Northern Territory, former uranium mining site

In the United States:

- Fitch Creek, Pennsylvania
- Fitch, North Carolina, unincorporated community
- Fitch H. Beach Airport, Charlotte, Michigan
- Fitch Senior High School, Groton, Connecticut
- Mount Fitch (Massachusetts), third-highest summit in Massachusetts
- YMCA Camp Fitch on Lake Erie, in Springfield, Pennsylvania; named after John H. Fitch

== Businesses ==
- Abercrombie & Fitch, clothiers
- Fitch, Even, Tabin & Flannery, Chicago's oldest law firm
- Fitch Ratings Inc., international credit rating agency
- Fitch, a label launched by Madonna (studio) in 2007; with a special focus on the bakunyū niche

== Ships ==
- USS Fitch (DD-462), US Navy destroyer
- USS Aubrey Fitch (FFG-34), U.S. naval ship

== Heraldry ==
- Fitch (or cross fitchy), a cross in heraldry where the lower part is shaped like a sword blade

== Mathematics, logic and technology ==
- Fitch notation, method for constructing formal mathematical proofs
- Fitch's paradox of knowability, logical paradox which asserts that the existence of an unknown truth is unknowable
- Fitch barrier, sand-filled plastic barrier used to cushion impacts on highways
- Fitch-Margoliash method, weighted least squares method for clustering

== Animals and plants ==
- Fitch, the European polecat (Mustela putorius), a ferret-like predatory mammal
- Fitch, a name for the spice kalonji, the seed of Nigella sativa (used in the King James's Version of the Bible)

== See also ==
- Fitchburg (disambiguation)
- Fitchville, Connecticut
