= Henderson Park =

Henderson Park may refer to:

- Henderson Park (Chehalis, Washington), a park in Washington, USA
- Henderson Park (Lethbridge), a park in Canada
- Henderson Park-West Main Hill Historic District, a district in Michigan, USA
- Henderson Park (Henderson, Texas), a baseball park in Texas, USA
