= John Fitch =

John Fitch may refer to:

- John Fitch (computer scientist) (born 1945), computer scientist, mathematician and composer
- John Fitch (inventor) (1743–1798), early American inventor, built the first steamboat in the United States in 1786
- John Fitch, Massachusetts settler for whom Fitchburg, Massachusetts is named
- John Fitch (racing driver) (1917–2012), racing driver, inventor of innovative safety devices and descendant of John Fitch (inventor)
- John A. Fitch (1881–1959), writer and professor of labor relations
- John H. Fitch, the eponym of YMCA Camp Fitch in Springfield, Pennsylvania
- John Knowles Fitch (1880–1943), founder of Fitch Ratings, Ltd
- John Nugent Fitch (1840–1927), botanical illustrator

== See also ==
- Jon Fitch (born 1978), U.S. mixed martial arts fighter
