= J. Wight Giddings =

American politician (1858–1933)

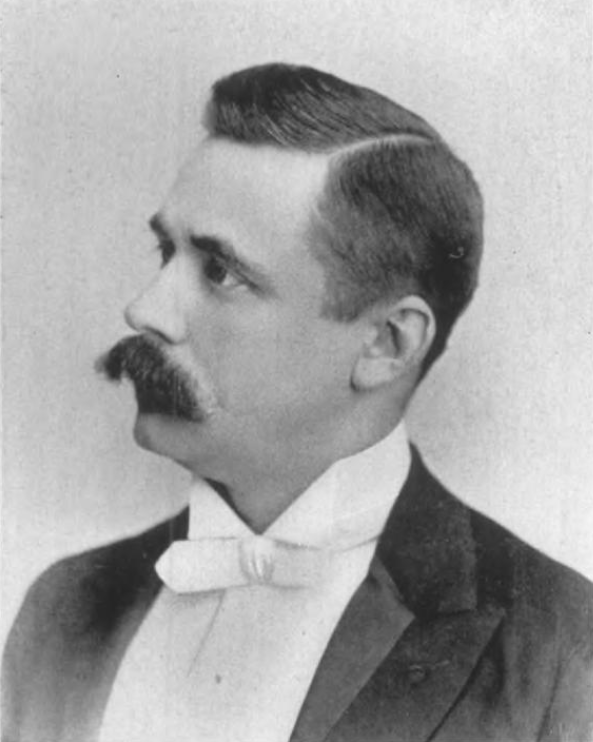
- Giddings in 1900

27th Lieutenant Governor of Michigan
- In office January 1, 1893 – January 1, 1895
- Governor: John T. Rich
- Preceded by: John Strong
- Succeeded by: Alfred Milnes

Member of the Michigan Senate from the 28th district
- In office January 2, 1887 – 1890

Personal details
- Born: Jabez Wight Giddings; September 27, 1858 Romeo, Michigan, US
- Died: July 1, 1933 (aged 74) Taos, New Mexico, US
- Party: Republican
- Occupation: Politician, lawyer, newspaperman

Jabez Wight Giddings (September 27, 1858 – July 1, 1933) was an American politician, lawyer, and newspaperman. A Republican, he served as the Lieutenant Governor of Michigan, under John T. Rich.

== Early life and education ==
Giddings was born on September 27, 1858, in Romeo, Michigan, the son of Moses Avery Giddings and Caroline (née Beekman) Giddings. Educated at common schools, he graduated from high school in Romeo, in 1877, then studied at Oberlin College and Amherst College, for one year and for three years, respectively. While at Oberlin, he joined Delta Kappa Epsilon. He lived in Cadillac.

== Career ==
In 1880 and 1881, Giddings was a lawyer for the Chicago and North Western Railway. From 1882 to spring 1887, he operated the Cadillac Evening News. He sold the paper and returned to practicing law, having been admitted to the bar in 1886. After selling the paper, he entered a partnership with S. J. Wall. In 1888 and 1889, he was in a partnership with one E. E. Haskins. From then on, he practiced law alone.

Giddings was a Republican. He rose to political prominence by speaking at political events. From January 2, 1887 to 1890, he was a member of the Michigan Senate, representing the 28th district. While in the Senate, he was a member of the following Committees: Engrossment and Enrollment, Institution for the Deaf and Dumb, Labor Interests, Mining School and Mining Interests, Printing, Railroads, Saline Interests, State Public School, and Supplies and Expenses.

Giddings served as Lieutenant Governor from January 1, 1893, to January 1, 1895, under John T. Rich. He won the Lieutenant Governor election with 222,770 votes. From 1896 to 1902, he was judge of the Cadillac Recorder's Court. For seven or eight years, he was a member of the Cadillac Board of Education, and in 1896 was chairman of the Michigan State Republican Convention.

Besides politics, Giddings was a lecturer. He moved to Arizona and worked as a copper miner, by suggestion of painter Charles S. Rawles, who was also the son of military officer Jacob Beekman Rawles. Around 1910, he moved to Taos, New Mexico. There, he edited The Santa Fe New Mexican and the Taos Valley News, working the latter job until his death.

== Personal life and death ==
In 1883, Giddings married Fidele Emelie Fitch, the daughter of politician Ferris S. Fitch Sr., thereby making Giddings a brother-in-law of politicians Ferris S. Fitch Jr. and Charles C. Fitch. He and Fidele had one child together. On February 14, 1907, he married Emmalyn Madelaine (née Wright) Miller, divorcing in 1910. On June 27, 1910, he married Anna L. Bedell.

Giddings was a member of the Knights of Pythias. He was previously rich, but he lost most of his wealth to unsuccessful business ventures. He died on July 1, 1933, aged 74, in Taos, New Mexico. He was buried on July 2, at Sierra Vista Cemetery, in Taos.
