= Kendall House =

Kendall House may refer to:

In the United States (by state, city)

- Noble–Kendall House, Albia, Iowa, listed on the National Register of Historic Places (NRHP) in Monroe County, Iowa
- Deacon Thomas Kendall House, Wakefield, Massachusetts, NRHP-listed
- Silas W. Kendall House, Kalamazoo, Michigan, NRHP-listed
- Wallace Warren and Lillian Genevieve Bradshaw Kendall House, Superior, Nebraska, NRHP-listed
- Zeb Kendall House, Tonopah, Nevada, NRHP-listed
- Joseph Kendall House, Portland, Oregon, NRHP-listed
