= Ed Fitch =

American writer (1937–2024)

Edward Fitch (April 29, 1937 – February 24, 2024) was an American occult author and a High Priest of the Gardnerian Wicca tradition, and was a leading figure in the rise of contemporary Wicca and Neo-Paganism in America. He previously lived in Austin, Texas.

== Military service and education ==
Fitch was a graduate of Virginia Military Institute, and a United States Air Force commissioned officer, eventually retiring with the rank of lieutenant colonel. He held a master's degree in Systems Management from the University of Southern California. His military service took him to Japan, Vietnam, Thailand, and several posts in the United States. After completing his three-year term of service, he returned to the US as a civilian, and took employment as a technical writer and electronics engineer in Washington D.C. He returned to the Air Force in 1966 and remained in the service, working in missile design and deep-space planning studies until retiring.

== Influence in Neo-Paganism ==
Fitch, who also went under the name "Ea", was initiated by Raymond Buckland in 1967, while stationed in Hanscom Air Force Base in Massachusetts. He was one of the creators (along with Joseph Bearwalker Wilson and Thomas Giles) of "The Pagan Way", an outer court Neo-Pagan tradition. He was one of the editors of The Waxing Moon, a magazine founded by Joseph B. Wilson in 1964, and the first magazine devoted to Witchcraft in America (later renamed The Crystal Well). In the mid 1970s, Fitch also helped to organize and chaired two Pagan Ecumenical Councils to establish the Covenant of the Goddess (COG) as an international umbrella organization representing Pagans. Through the 1980s Fitch continued to perform as a Gardnerian High Priest, but his researches also led him to initiation in a number of other traditions and orders, including: Faerie faith, Mohsian, the Order of Osiris, the Order of the Temple of Astarte, Norse, and Ceremonial magick.

== Other activities ==
Besides being the author of several books on magic and Neo-Pagan topics, his employment over the years included being a technical writer and electronics engineer in Washington D.C., working as a private detective, as a shopkeeper at Disneyland, California, as an editor for a small publishing house, and as a trouble-shooter for the Federal Aviation Administration (FAA) in Washington DC, before returning to the aerospace industry in California in 1997. His Nick name was Oberon and he was dubbed the King of Goth in Orange County, California, and by the Pagan Community of Huntington Beach, in the 1990s, he owned the large Unicorn Statue he purchased from Elfstone Hollow, a pagan bar that closed down. It was in his yard in Midway City California. He relocated to Austin, Texas around 2021.

Fitch died from a stroke on February 24, 2024, at the age of 86.

== Bibliography ==
- Castle of Deception: A Novel of Sorcery and Swords and Other-Worldly Matters, With Seven Short Essays on the Reality of Matters Supernatural (1983) Llewellyn Publications ISBN 978-0-87542-231-2
- A Grimoire of Shadows: Witchcraft, Paganism, & Magick (2002) Llewellyn Publications ISBN 978-1-56718-659-8
- Magical Rites from the Crystal Well (1984) Llewellyn Publications ISBN 978-0-87542-230-5
- The Outer Court Book of Shadows
- Rites of Odin (2002) Llewellyn Publications ISBN 978-0-87542-224-4
- The Rituals of the Pagan Way: A Book of Pagan Rituals (with Joseph B. Wilson and Thomas Giles)
