= Kalamazoo State Hospital Water Tower =

- U.S. National Register of Historic Places
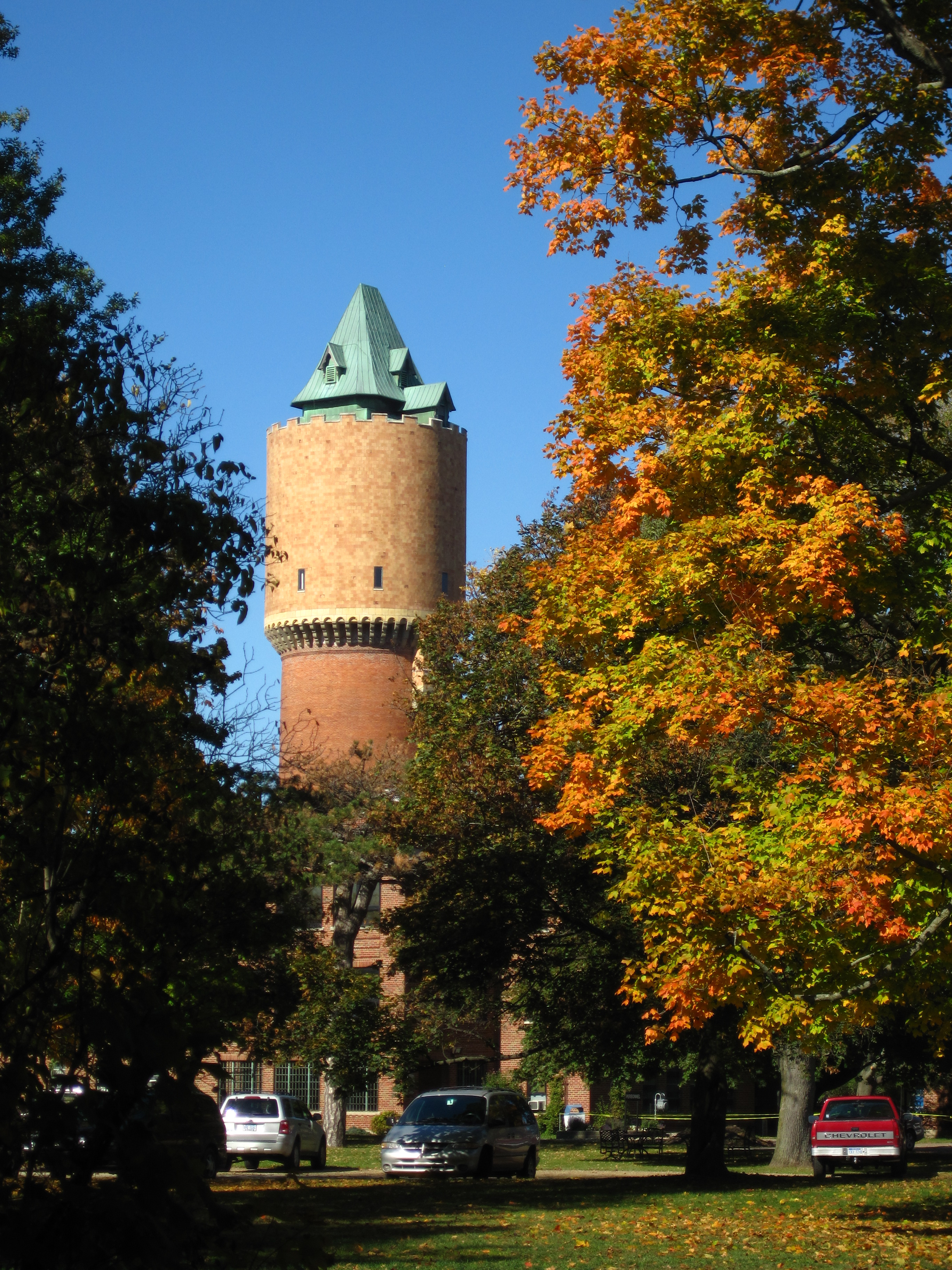

- Location within Michigan Location within the United States
- Interactive map
- Location: Oakland Dr., Kalamazoo, Michigan
- Coordinates: 42°16′45″N 85°36′16″W
- Area: less than one acre
- Built: 1895
- Architect: William B. Stratton
- NRHP reference No.: 72000624
- Added to NRHP: March 16, 1972

The Kalamazoo State Hospital Water Tower is located in Kalamazoo, Michigan. It was built in 1895 and was added to the National Register of Historic Places on March 16, 1972. It is located on the grounds of the Kalamazoo Regional Psychiatric Hospital.

== History ==
The Kalamazoo Regional Psychiatric Hospital was founded in 1859 and soon became a landmark in American medicine. Buildings on the grounds were Thomas Kirkbride and Samuel Sloan, nationally renowned hospital architects. The buildings they designed were reminiscent of medieval designs. In 1895, architect William B. Stratton from Detroit was commissioned to design a water tower on site. Stratton was instructed to come up with a structure that would complement the medieval feeling of the other buildings on the hospital grounds. Construction was completed in 1895.

The tower has been struck by lightning multiple times, and the roof was eventually replaced with copper sheeting. The structure was earmarked by the State of Michigan for demolition in 1974. However, a local committee called the Committee to Save the Tower launched a campaign to raise public funds to restore the tower.

== Description ==
The tower is 175 feet tall. The base stone blocks are five feet high; above this point the tower is made of bricks. It is approximately 50 feet wide at its widest point. The outer shell tapers from six feet thick at the base to four feet at the top. The tower has three water storage tanks inside. The main tank is 40 feet high and 40 feet in diameter and can hold more than 200,000 gallons of hard water. Two smaller tanks flank the main tank and hold soft water. Above the tanks is a "look-out" structure with a steeply pitched roof covered with copper sheeting.
