= Fytche =

Fytche is an ancient surname derived from Fitch. Notable people with the surname include:

- Albert Fytche (1820–1892), Chief Commissioner of Burma
- Elizabeth Fytche (1781–1865), mother of Alfred Tennyson, 1st Baron Tennyson
- Frances Elizabeth Disney Fytche, Essex-born heiress, wife of William Hillary
- Lewis Disney Fytche (1738–1822), English landowner, originally Lewis Disney, father of Frances Elizabeth Disney Fytche
- Stephen Fytche (1734–1799), vicar of Louth (1764) and rector of Withcall (1780), grandfather of Alfred Tennyson, 1st Baron Tennyson
- William Fytche (1716–1753), 1752 Governor of Bengal
- William Fytche (MP) (1671–1728), Member of Parliament from Maldon
- stagename of Tammy Lynn Sytch (born 1972)

== Baronetcy in the Baronetage of England ==
Title	Date of creation	Surname	Current status	Notes
Fytche of Eltham	1688	Fytche	extinct 1736	

== Other ==
- Fytche v. Wincanton Logistics Plc [2004] UKHL 31 House of Lords case
- Flintham Hall has been successively the seat of the Husseys, Hackers, Woodhouses, Disneys, Fytches and Thorotons
- Dendrobium fytchianum: Fytch's Dendrobium

== See also ==
- Fitch (surname)
