= Henry R. Pattengill =

American educator and politician (1852–1918)

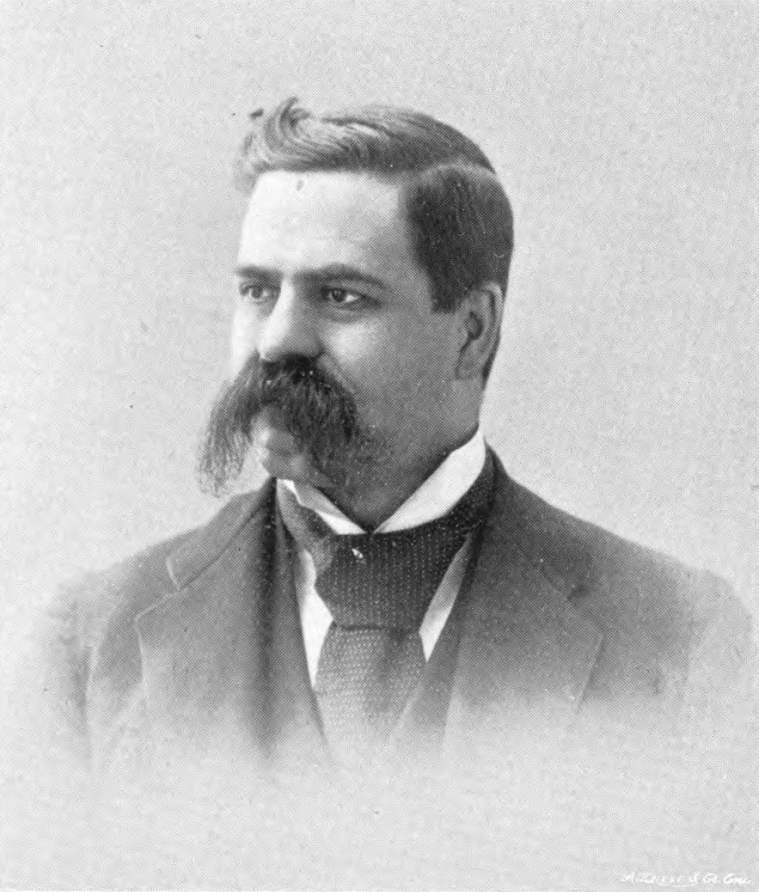

Michigan Superintendent of Public Instruction
- In office 1893–1896
- Preceded by: Ferris S. Fitch Jr.
- Succeeded by: Jason E. Hammond

Personal details
- Born: January 4, 1852 Mount Vision, New York, U.S.
- Died: November 26, 1918 (aged 66) Lansing, Michigan, U.S.
- Party: Republican
- Other political affiliations: Progressive (1912–1915)
- Spouse: Elizabeth Sharpsteen (m. 1877; died 1915)
- Education: University of Michigan (BS)

Henry Romaine Pattengill (January 4, 1852 – November 26, 1918) was an American educator and politician. He was the Michigan Superintendent of Public Instruction from 1893 to 1896, elected as a Republican, and was the Progressive nominee in the 1914 Michigan gubernatorial election.

== Early life and education ==
Henry R. Pattengill was born on January 4, 1852, in Mount Vision, New York, to parents Lemuel C. and Mary G. Pattengill. His father was a Baptist pastor, and the family moved across New York State throughout Henry's childhood. At Wilson, at seven years old, Pattengill experienced a near-fatal accident in which he was run over by a mechanical reaper being pulled by horses. His left arm, hand, leg, and hip were injured. This manifested as slight lameness in his adult life. Pattengill had desired to become a sailor; after the accident, he directed his attention toward obtaining education.

The Pattengill family moved to Litchfield, Michigan in the fall of 1865. Pattengill received his primary education from district and village schools in New York and Michigan. Pattengill then took a college preparatory course in Hudson. In 1870, Pattengill started attending the University of Michigan. He served two years as editor of the college newspaper, Chronicle. In 1874, Pattengill graduated from the literary department with a Bachelors of Science. Pattengill served as one of the commencement speakers at the graduation ceremony.

== Career ==
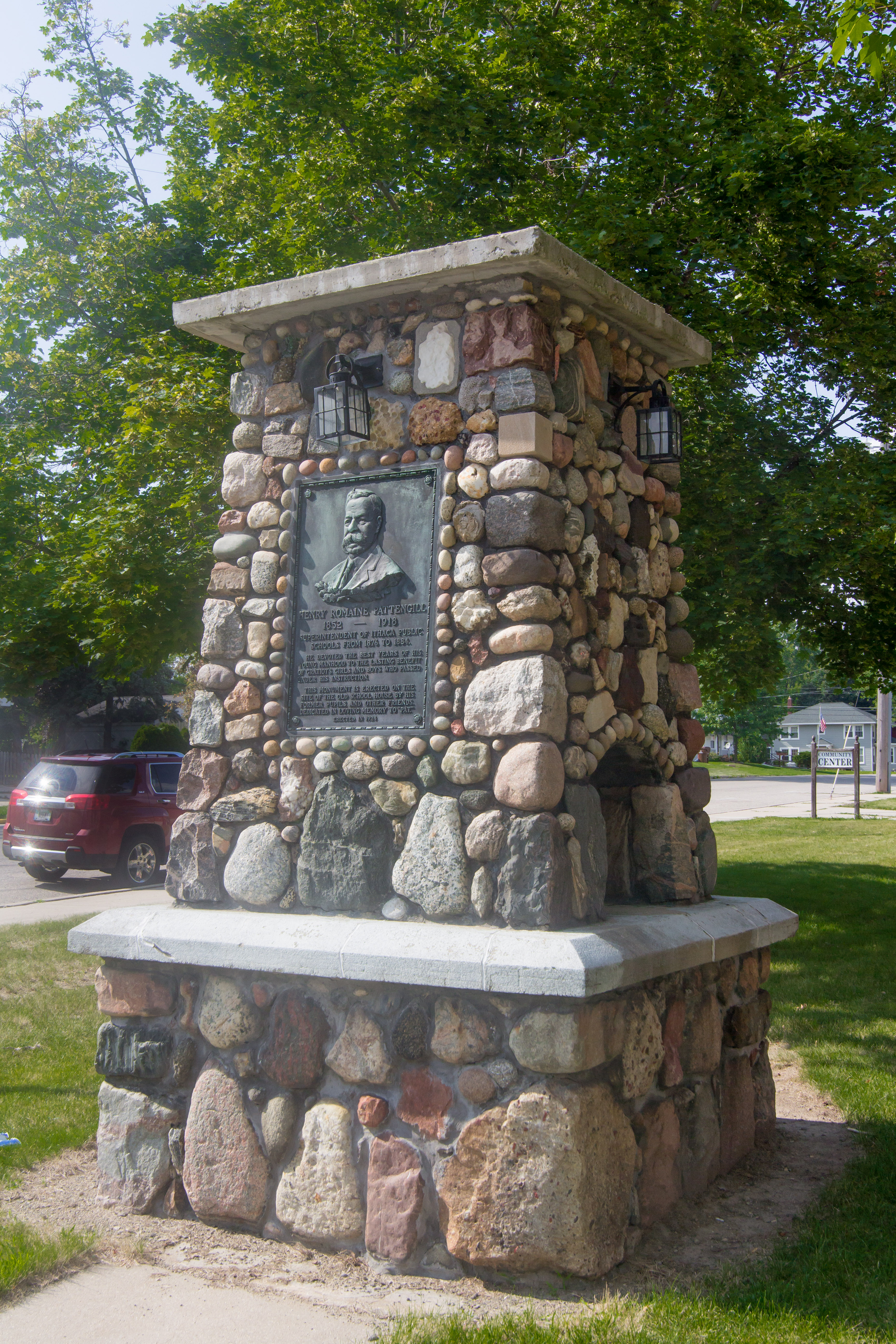
The Henry R. Pattengill monument in Ithaca

After graduating from the University of Michigan in 1874, Pattengill was appointed Superintendent of Schools in St. Louis in Gratiot County. He served in this position for two years. In the fall of 1876, he was made Superintendent of Schools in Ithaca. He served in this role for eight years. During his time in Ithaca, Pattengill constructed a high school. In 1881, Pattengill was elected village president of Ithaca. He was elected to a second term the next year. He also served as president of the Gratiot County Teachers' Association for eight years, starting in 1877. In 1883, Pattengill was elected to the county Board of School Examiners, and the same year was made secretary of the Michigan Teachers' Association. In 1884, Pattengill ran as a Republican candidate for the state legislature, but was defeated by Democrat Henry A. Weiss.

In 1884, Pattengill moved to Grand Rapids after being offered the position of assistant editor of the Michigan School Moderator magazine. In 1885, Pattengill bought out the magazine, becoming the sole proprietor. He moved its operations to Lansing. The magazine later became known as Moderator Topics. In addition to the magazine, Pattengill published a number of textbooks, including those of which he wrote himself, such as the Civil Government of Michigan. In 1886, Pattengill filled a vacancy at the State Agricultural College (now known as Michigan State University), where he became an assistant professor of English. He served in this position until 1890. In 1888, Pattengill began an annual reunion event between him and his students from his time as an educator at Gratiot County.

Pattengill was the Republican nominee for Michigan Superintendent of Public Instruction in 1892. In the general election, he defeated incumbent Democrat Superintendent Ferris S. Fitch Jr. In December 1892, Pattengill named Jason E. Hammond as his deputy superintendent. To comply with state law regarding his eligibility for office, Pattengill sold his textbook publishing company to Robert Smith & Co., as to remove his interest from the textbook industry. However, he remained proprietor of the Michigan School Moderator. He was re-elected to the position in 1894, defeating Democratic nominee Albert Jennings. Pattengill also served as the president of the Michigan Board of Library Commissioners and as secretary of Michigan State Historical Society.

In 1912, Pattengill was involved in organizing the Michigan Progressive Party, better known as the Bull Moose Party. Pattengill also returned to the textbook publishing business after his tenure as superintendent of public instruction. In 1913, Pattengill took an extended tour of the Panama Canal Zone. Later that year, he was nominated for the University of Michigan board of regents by the Progressives, however, he refused the nomination and withdrew his candidacy due to the Progressives' adoption of a policy of uniform textbooks.

On June 19, 1914, the Progressive state committee unanimously nominated Pattengill for governor. On June 22, Pattengill accepted the Progressive nomination. L. Whitney Watkins, previous Progressive nominee for governor, refused to take the nomination under any circumstance. Former President Theodore Roosevelt endorsed Pattengill's gubernatorial campaign instead of Republican nominee Chase S. Osborn. Pattengill was not contested in the Progressive primary election. Pattengill did not campaign until after the primary elections. On the campaign trail, Pattengill voiced approval for the prohibition of alcohol and women's suffrage. Pattengill ultimately received 36,747 votes, not winning a single county.

Pattengill was still a member of the Progressive Party in 1915, though he felt he could return to the Republicans given they adopted a progressive platform. In 1916, Pattengill was again nominated for governor by the Progressive Party. By this point however, Pattengill had returned to the Republican Party. He supported the candidacy of Republican Charles Evans Hughes for president. He wrote to Michigan Secretary of State Coleman C. Vaughan asking for his name to be removed from the ballot. Pattengill received 95 votes in the 1916 general election.

== Personal life ==
Pattengill married Elizabeth A. Sharpsteen on July 17, 1877. She was a public school teacher. Together, they had four children, two sons and two daughters. Elizabeth Pattengill died on May 21, 1915, at her Lansing home. Pattengill was a Baptist.

== Death and legacy ==
In 1918, Pattengill had fallen seriously ill for weeks. He went to Boston for medical consultation, and returned to his Lansing home on November 22. He died there on November 26, of acute liver disease. He was survived by his four children.

The annual Pattengill Reunion events continued after Pattengill's death. The committee which facilitated these events began to work to promoting Pattengill's legacy, by means such as placing his portrait in Gratiot County schools and creating a state memorial in Pattengill's name. On January 8, 1920, the Detroit Board of Education passed a resolution to build an elementary school named after Pattengill. The school was opened on November 23, 1921. In November 1921, the Michigan State Teachers' Association established high school scholarships in Pattengill's name. In 1924, there was a cairn monument built and dedicated to Pattengill in Ithaca, on land that was once a school building where he taught. It was funded by his former students. It was constructed with 510 stones from around the world. In 2010, it was registered as a Michigan State Historic Site, and a plaque commemorating Pattengill was erected in 2011.

Party political offices
Preceded by L. Whitney Watkins	Progressive nominee for Governor of Michigan; 1914, 1916	last
