= Ladies Library Association Building =

Historic clubhouse in Kalamazoo, Michigan, USA

- U.S. National Register of Historic Places
- U.S. Historic district – Contributing property
- Michigan State Historic Site
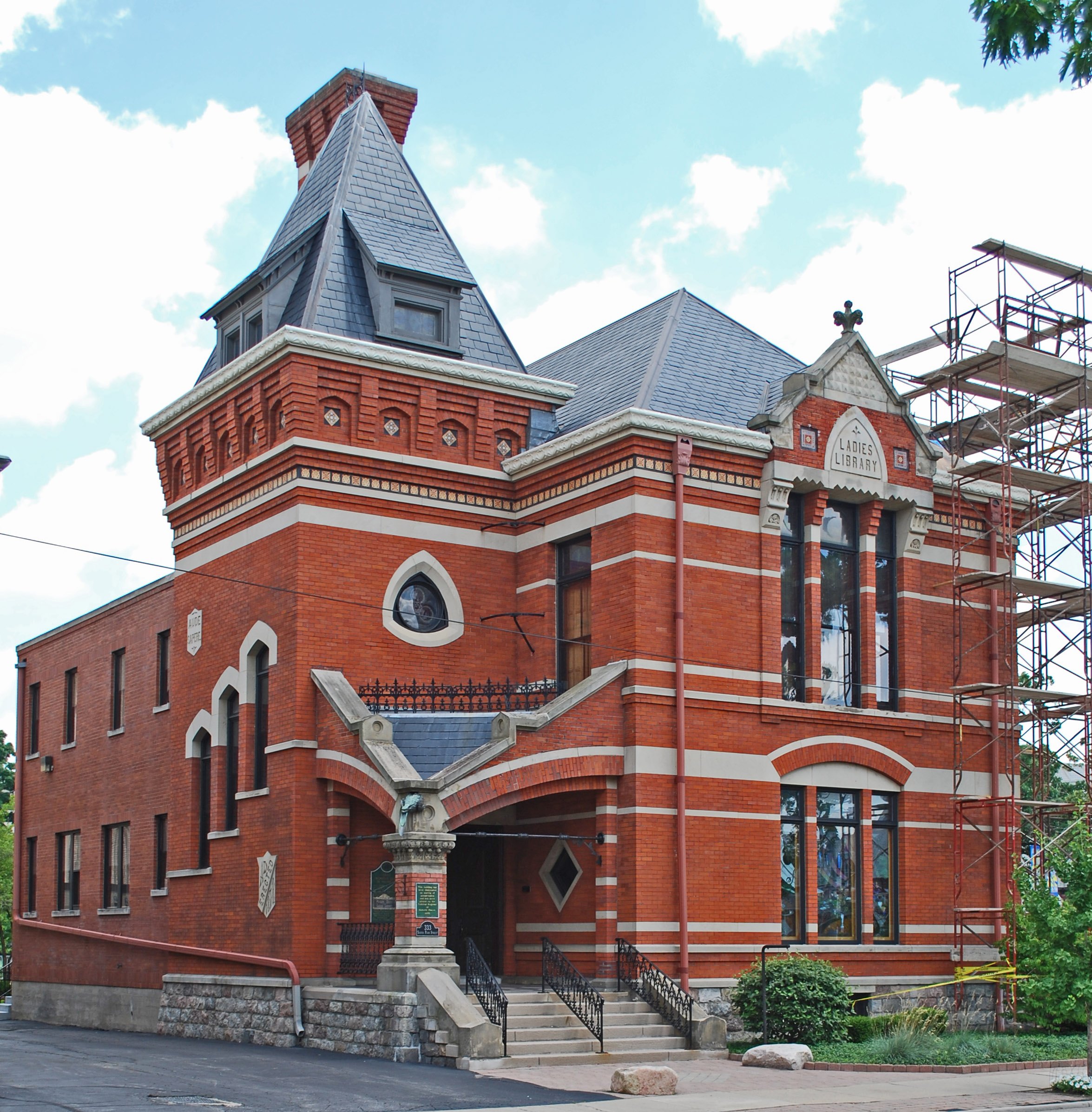

- Location within Michigan
- Interactive map
- Location: 333 S. Park Street, Kalamazoo, Michigan
- Coordinates: 42°17′21″N 85°35′13″W
- Built: 1879
- Built by: Frederick Bush
- Architect: Henry Lloyd Gay
- Architectural style: Venetian Gothic Revival
- Part of: Bronson Park Historic District (ID83000855)
- NRHP reference No.: 70000274
- Added to NRHP: July 8, 1970

The Ladies Library Association Building in Kalamazoo, Michigan was the first building erected as a women's club in the United States. It was also the country's first structure owned by a women's organization. It was built in 1879 by funds raised by the Ladies' Library Association of Kalamazoo (LLA).

== History ==
The Ladies' Library Association of Kalamazoo was founded in 1852, with the purpose of increasing the education of is members. For the first few decades, the Association had no permanent meeting place, and focused on creating their library. However, in 1878, the association decided to construct a library building. They raised funds, and construction started in 1879. The lot for the building was donated by Ruth Webster, long-time member of the LLA. The building was designed by Chicago architect Henry Lloyd Gay and built by Frederick Bush. A kitchen wing was added in 1913.

The building became a Michigan State Historic Site in 1961 and was listed on the National Register of Historic Places in 1970.

== Current status ==
The Ladies Library Association Building is still occupied by the Ladies' Library Association of Kalamazoo. In 2013 the LLA completed restoration of the building which brought the structure to present-day code. In 2015 it received the State History Award in Historic Restoration.

== Description ==
The Ladies Library Association Building is a two-story red brick building, the original section of which is 30 feet by 60 feet with an attached tower with a footprint of 14 feet by 18 feet. A two-story kitchen wing was later added on the rear of the tower. It is built in the Venetian Gothic Revival style. The building has a slate roof, sits on a granite foundation, and light-colored cut stone trim is used throughout the exterior. Architectural details include ornamental ironwork, decorative tiles, and stained glass windows.
