= The Pagan Movement =

The Pagan Movement in Britain and Ireland was formed in 1970 when the American witch Joe Wilson (then based in Britain with the USAF) got together with Tony Kelly and others with the intention of forming a new movement with the aim of “creating a society wherein everyone will be free to worship the Goddesses and Gods of Nature”. This was announced in Joe Wilson's newsletter The Waxing Moon, re-launched in a new series as the Movement's magazine. He wrote in the editorial of the first issue (Samhain 1970) explaining how the initial discussion with many members of the wiccan community had led to a disagreement about the philosophy of the new movement and how this led to the editor of The Wiccan magazine deciding to start a different movement instead which he called ‘The Pagan Front’. This later changed its name (under different leadership) to The Pagan Federation.

When Joe Wilson returned to America, Tony Kelly became the leading figure and the Selene Community in Wales where he lived became the location for regular seasonal rites held in fulfilment of the Movement's initial intention of organising meetings for pagan worship. The Waxing Moon magazine appeared intermittently and was later renamed The Heathen ( a term which at that time did not have the connotations it has since developed of specifically denoting Norse or Anglo-Saxon paganism). The Movement also produced a regular newsletter for its members and an even more voluminous series of discussion newsletters for its inner ‘Ethos Group’. These were printed in limited numbers on a stencil duplicator though some material has been preserved in an online archive:

The Movement continued into the 1980s depleted of much of its membership following dissension.

Some members came together with others for a final time at the Selene Community to perform a funeral rite for Tony Kelly who died of motor neurone disease in 1997.
