= Fitchburg =

Fitchburg may refer to:

== Places in the United States of America ==
- Fitchburg, California
- Fitchburg, Kentucky
- Fitchburg, Massachusetts
- Fitchburg, Michigan
- Fitchburg, Wisconsin

== Transportation ==
- Fitchburg Railroad, a former railroad in Massachusetts
  - Fitchburg Line, a rail service using part of the former railroad
  - Fitchburg station, a railroad station in Fitchburg, Massachusetts
- Fitchburg station (California), a former railroad station
