= 1734 Tradition =

Form of traditional witchcraft

- Type: Wicca
- Orientation: Cochrane's Craft
- Governance: Priesthood
- Founder: Joseph Bearwalker Wilson
- Origin: 1963 (De facto), 1974 (De jure)
- Members: Unknown

The 1734 Tradition is a form of traditional witchcraft founded by the American Joseph Bearwalker Wilson in 1973, after developing it since 1964. It is largely based upon the teachings he received from an English traditional witch named Robert Cochrane, the founder of Cochrane's Craft, and from Ruth Wynn-Owen, whom he called the matriarch of Y Plant Bran ("the child of Bran").
