= Vicksburg Union Depot =

Museum in Vicksburg, Michigan

Vicksburg
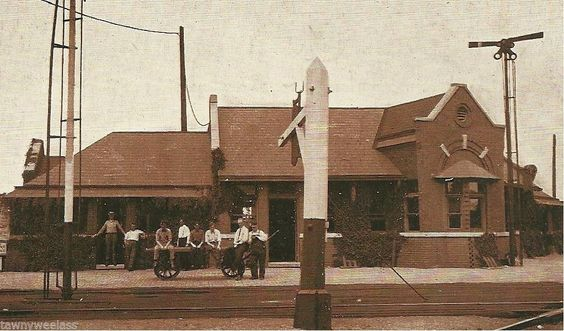
- Vicksburg Union Depot c. 1910

General information
- Location: Vicksburg, Michigan; United States.
- System: Grand Trunk Railroad and Pennsylvania Railroad
- Lines: Grand Trunk Western Railroad, Pennsylvania Railroad

Construction
- Structure type: one floor

Other information
- Status: restored

History
- Opened: 1870
- Closed: 1972
- Rebuilt: 1904

Former services
Preceding station	Grand Trunk Western Railroad	Following station
Schoolcraft toward Chicago	Main Line	Pavilion toward Port Huron
Preceding station	Pennsylvania Railroad	Following station
Kalamazoo toward Mackinaw City	Grand Rapids & Indiana Railway	Mendon toward Richmond
- Vicksburg Union Depot
- U.S. National Register of Historic Places
- Location within Michigan Location within the United States
- Location: 300 N. Richardson St. Vicksburg, Michigan
- Coordinates: 42°7′26″N 85°31′47″W
- Built: 1904
- Architect: Williamson & Crow
- Architectural style: Romanesque Revival / Tudor Revival
- NRHP reference No.: 100010197
- Added to NRHP: April 4, 2024
Location

The Vicksburg Union Depot is a former railroad station and current museum located at 300 North Richardson Street in Vicksburg, Michigan. It has operated as the Union Depot Museum since 1990, and was added to the National Register in 2024.

== History ==
In 1847, the Grand Rapids and Indiana Railroad received a grant to construct a rail line south from Grand Rapids through Vicksburg. This line was completed in 1870. In 1872, the Grand Trunk Railway built a second line through the town. A wood framed depot was constructed at the intersection of the two lines by the Grand Rapids and Indiana Railroad. The Peninsular Railway leased space in the building, and the depot served both lines. This lasted until 1900, when a fire destroyed the building.

In 1903, plans were announced to construct a new depot, servicing both lines. The Grand Rapids & Indiana Railroad hired the Grand Rapids architectural firm Williamson & Crow to design the new depot. The depot opened in 1904. In 1920, Grand Trunk was taken over by the Canadian National Railway, and in 1922 the Grand Rapids and Indiana Railroad was taken over by the Pennsylvania Railroad.

However, after World War II, passenger volumes decreased, and in 1968 the Pennsylvania Railroad ceased passenger operations to Vicksburg. In 1972, Canadian National followed suit. In 1974, all freight service was suspended. Around that time, the Vicksburg Historical Society was formed to preserve the building, and restoration efforts began in the early 1980s. In 1983, the village of Vicksburg purchased the building, and in 1990 it was dedicated as a museum.

== Description ==
The Vicksburg Union Depot is a single story building constructed of red brick accentuated with stone detailing. It is sited at the intersection of two rail lines. The building has a skewed L-shaped footprint, with two wings each parallel to one section of track. The exterior design exhibits elements of both Romanesque Revival and Tudor Revival architecture. A projecting stone belt course encircles the building, and forms the sill of the windows on each side. The roof consists of a one-and-one-half story gabled central portion with lower, hipped extensions over each wing.

A three-window projecting bay is situated in the center of the track side of the building. Gabled wall dormers, with parapets and arched windows, are located on each side.
