= Jason E. Hammond =

American educator and politician

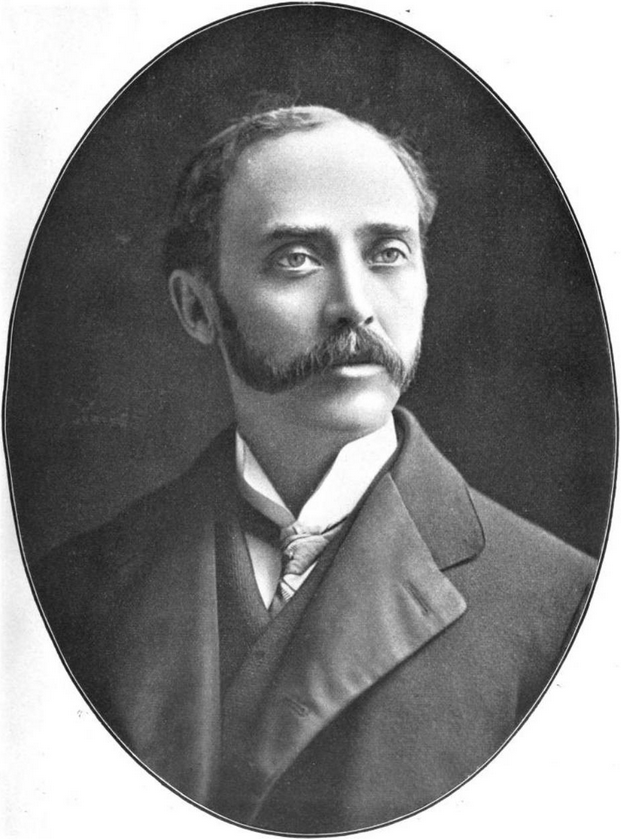

Michigan Superintendent of Public Instruction
- In office 1897–1900
- Preceded by: Henry R. Pattengill
- Succeeded by: Delos Fall

Personal details
- Born: Jason Elmer Hammond; May 17, 1862 Ransom Township, Michigan
- Died: October 20, 1957 (aged 95) New York, New York
- Party: Republican
- Spouse: Genevieve F. Whitten (m. 1893)
- Education: Hillsdale College; Michigan State Agricultural College
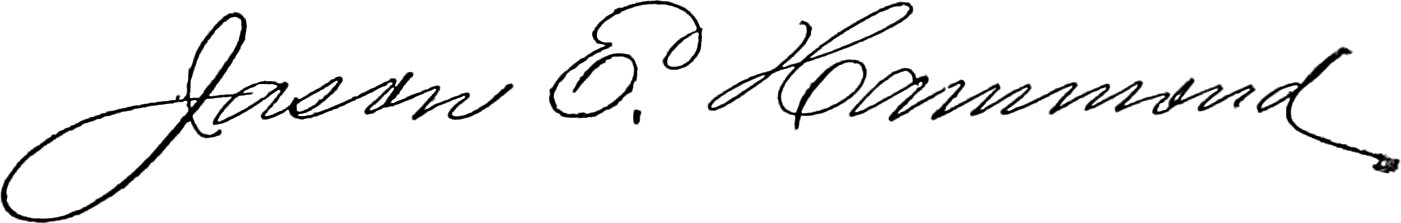
- Signature

Jason Elmer Hammond (May 17, 1862 – October 20, 1957) was an American educator and politician.

== Early life and education ==
Jason E. Hammond was born on May 17, 1862, in Ransom Township, Michigan in Hillsdale County, to Luther and Rhoba Hammond. He was their fifth child. Hammond's mother died on July 27, 1876, when he was fourteen years old. His father was a farmer. Hammond worked at his father's farm from ages fifteen to nineteen, attending district school in the winter. At nineteen years old, Hammond started attended Hillsdale College. He attended four terms, and then taught at district school for seven terms. In 1883, he started attending the Michigan State Agricultural College (now known as Michigan State University). He was a member of Alpha Tau Omega. He graduated in August 1886, with a Bachelors of Science. He served as alumni secretary of his graduating class.

== Career ==
After graduating, in 1886, Hammond served as principal of schools in Allen until 1890. He then served a similar position in North Adams until 1891. During this period, Hammond spent a summer doing work at the Michigan Normal School (now known as Eastern Michigan University) as well as reading law. In 1888, was elected to the Hillsdale County Board of School Examiners, on which he served until 1891. In 1891, the Michigan Legislature created the County Commissioner of Schools office. In June 1891, Hammond was appointed as the county commissioner for Hillsdale. He served as the Hillsdale County Commissioner of Schools until January 1893. In December 1892, Michigan Superintendent of Public Instruction-elect Henry R. Pattengill named Hammond as his deputy. Hammond served as deputy for Pattengill's tenure in office, from 1893 to 1897. Hammond wrote the book The School Law of Michigan, published in 1896.

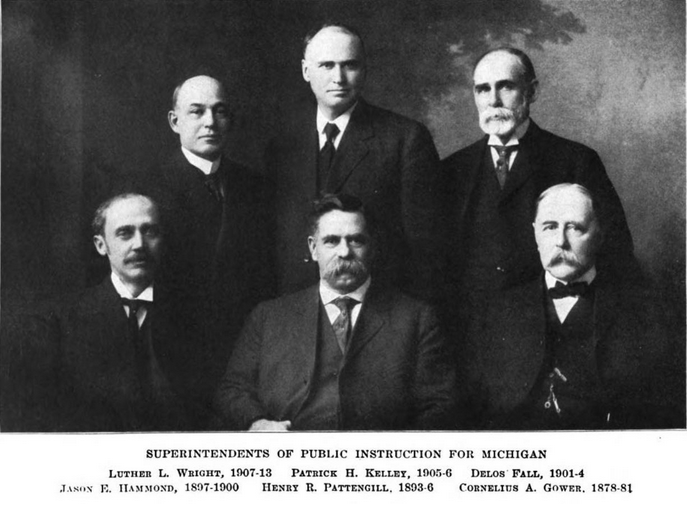
Hammond (front row, leftmost) with other superintendents of public instruction of Michigan.

In February 1896, Hammond wrote letters to Detroit politicians, expressing interest in seeking the Republican nomination for Superintendent of Public Instruction. On August 6, 1896, Hammond was nominated by the Republican convention at Grand Rapids, in a four way race. Hammond won the general election with 293,578 votes, compared to the 232,196 votes of David E. Haskins, the Democratic People's Union Silver candidate. After the general election, Hammond appointed Daniel E. McClure, one of his opponents in the convention, as deputy. Before his election, in 1896, Hammond began an investigation into the conditions of ten counties' schools. He investigated a school in each county, and collected information on various aspects of their conditions, as well photographs. Results were published in the superintendent report of 1897–1898.

Hammond was unopposed for Republican re-nomination in 1898. In the 1898 general election, Hammond defeated Democratic People's Union Silver candidate John F. Evert. In September 1899, Hammond made a new compilation of school laws. Since 1898, Hammond was in favor of a normal school in the Upper Peninsula of Michigan. On September 19, 1899, the Normal School at Marquette (now known as Northern Michigan University) was opened. In 1900, Hammond announced that he planned to retire from politics at the expiration of his superintendent term the same year. The same year, Hammond was granted an honorary master's degree from the Michigan State Agricultural College.

Hammond served as private secretary to Michigan Auditor General Perry F. Powers for four years, starting in 1900. From 1903 to 1912, he was manager of Hammond Publishing Company. From 1909 to 1915, he served as a trustee of the Kalamazoo State Hospital after an appointment by Governor Fred M. Warner. From 1912 to 1913, he served as a financial agent for Olivet College. From 1910 to 1919, Hammond participated in dry campaigns, rallying for the prohibition of alcohol at the local and state level, in Michigan, Illinois, and Missouri. In 1919, Hammond gave speeches to crowds of women, explaining the importance of voting, and educating them on the process of registering to vote. In 1921, Hammond was appointed by Governor Alex J. Groesbeck to the state welfare commission.

On May 1, 1919, Hammond became the manager of the Michigan Retail Dry Goods Association. Hammond also served as treasurer of the Michigan Merchants' Association and as associate secretary of the Grand Rapids Merchants' Mutual Fire Insurance Company. On April 22, 1942, Hammond announced his retirement as manager of the Michigan Retail Dry Goods Association. His retirement was made effective July 1.

== Personal life ==
Hammond married Genevieve F. Whitten on April 5, 1893, in Jonesville. Genevieve was a teacher. Together, they had one son. Hammond was a Freemason, belonging to the Masonic Lodge at Lansing. Hammond was a Congregationalist. He served as superintendent of the church school at the Plymouth Congregational Church in Lansing, and as a member of its educational committee.

== Death ==
After Hammond retired in 1942, he moved to New York City. He died there on October 20, 1957, in a nursing home on Fifth Avenue. He was interred in Jonesville, Michigan.
