= Deacon Thomas Kendall House =

Historic house in Massachusetts, United States

- U.S. National Register of Historic Places
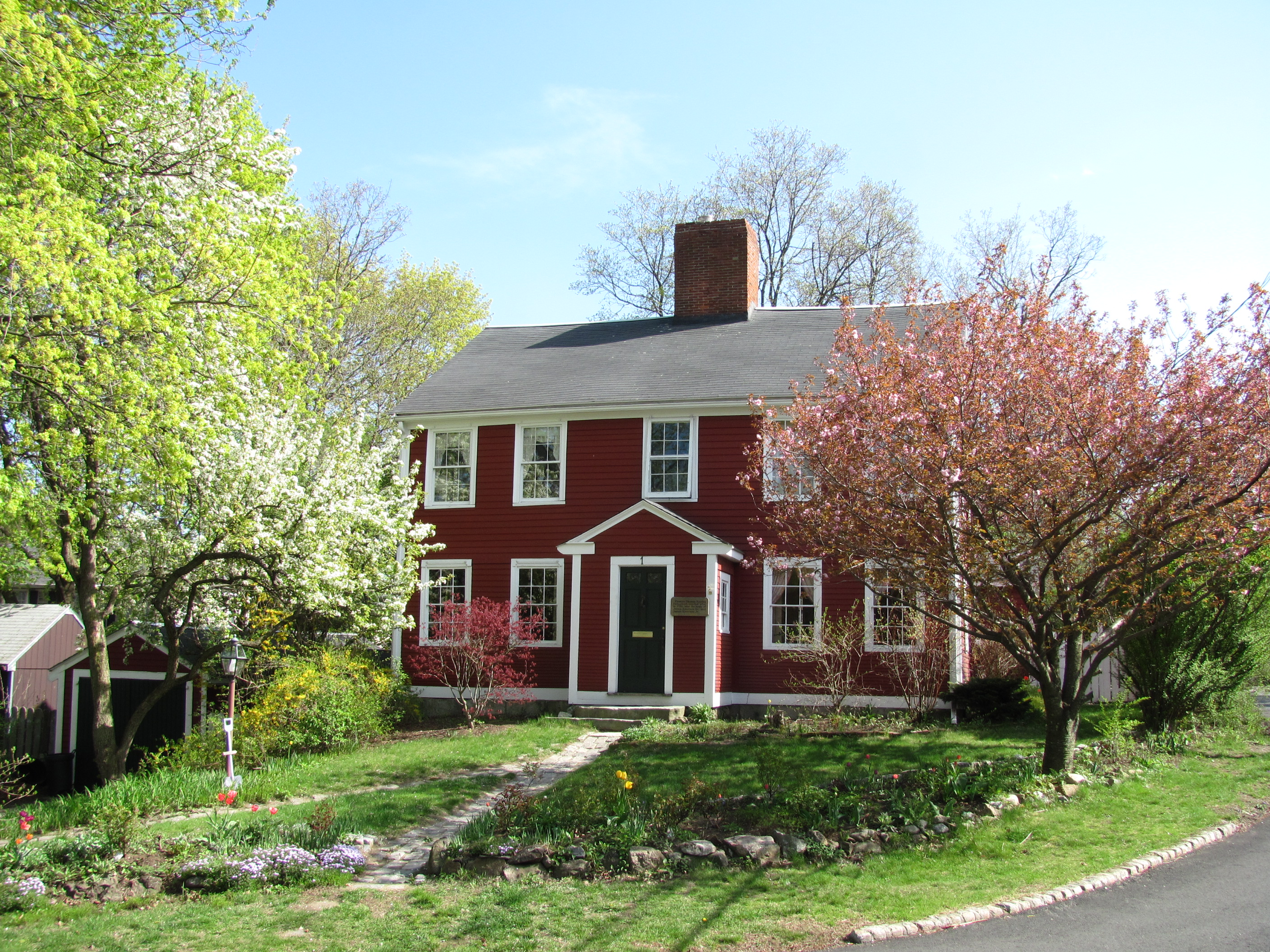
- Deacon Thomas Kendall House

- Location within Massachusetts Location within the United States
- Location: One Prospect St., Wakefield, Massachusetts
- Coordinates: 42°30′20″N 71°4′48″W
- Built: 1786
- Architectural style: Federal
- MPS: Wakefield MRA
- NRHP reference No.: 89000742
- Added to NRHP: July 06, 1989

The Deacon Thomas Kendall House is a historic house at One Prospect Street in Wakefield, Massachusetts. This timber frame, 2 1/2-story five-bay house has Federal styling, but its massive central chimney indicates that parts of the house likely predate the Federal period, and in a style that predates 1750 (Dea. Kendall lived 1618–1681). The house is believed to have suffered fire damage in 1786 and been reconstructed at that time, incorporating salvaged materials. Its exterior trim exhibits several different styles, that on the north and west sides more finely carved. The second-floor windows on the south side are smaller and set near the eaves, a typical colonial period feature. The house was listed on the National Register of Historic Places in 1989.

Deacon Thomas Kendall was an influential member of the community, serving as a selectman, commissioner, and deacon of the church for 36 years. He and his wife, Rebecca, had 10 children, and when she died, at the age of 85, she had 175 grandchildren and great-grandchildren. The Kendalls were among the earliest settlers of the Reading area (of which Wakefield was a part until the 19th century). The house was owned for much of the 19th century by the Emerson family, who also owned it at the time of the 1786 fire.

== See also ==
- National Register of Historic Places listings in Wakefield, Massachusetts
- National Register of Historic Places listings in Middlesex County, Massachusetts
