= State Hospital Gatehouse =

- U.S. National Register of Historic Places
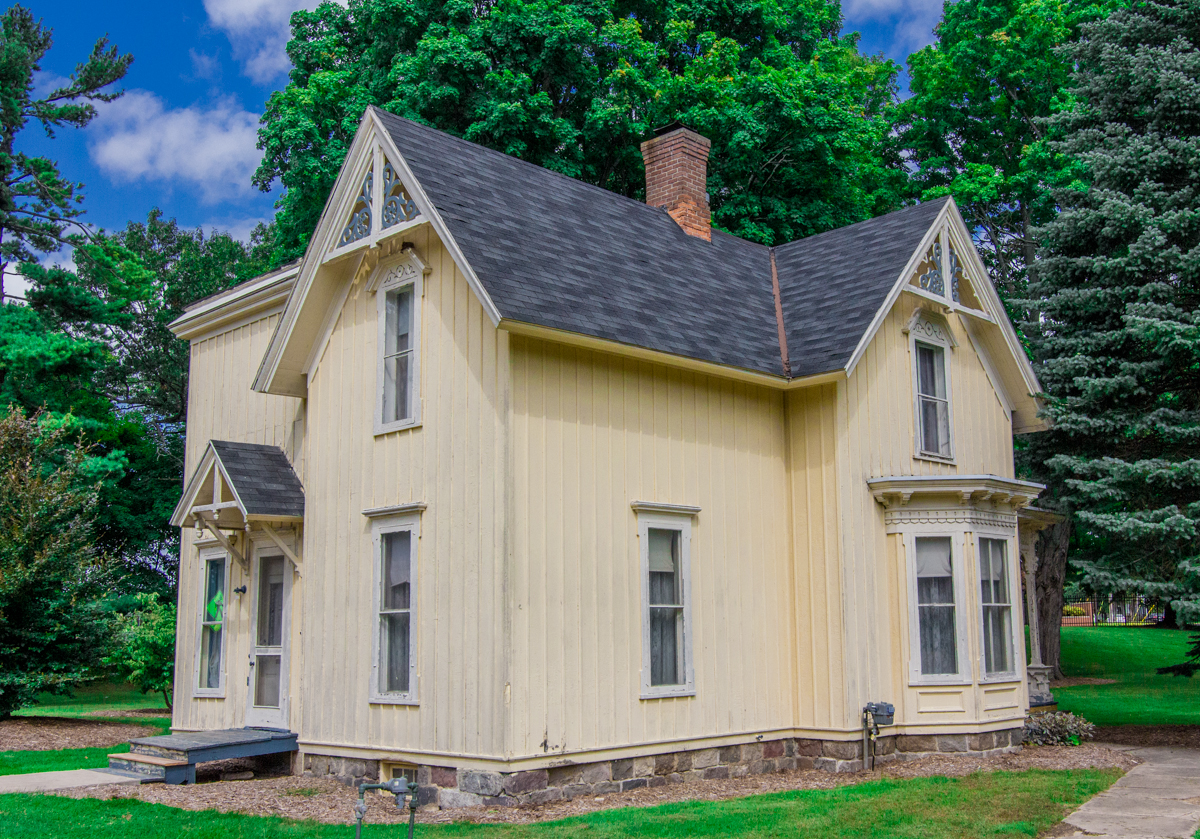
- Interactive map
- Location: 1006 Oakland Dr., Kalamazoo, Michigan
- Coordinates: 42°16′53″N 85°36′00″W
- Area: less than one acre
- Built: 1879
- Architectural style: Late Victorian
- MPS: Kalamazoo MRA
- NRHP reference No.: 83000872
- Added to NRHP: May 27, 1983

The State Hospital Gatehouse is a small house, constructed as a lodge and gatehouse at the entrance to the Michigan Asylum for the Insane (now the Kalamazoo Regional Psychiatric Hospital). It was listed on the National Register of Historic Places in 1983.

== History ==
The State Hospital Gatehouse was constructed in about 1879 at the entrance to the state hospital. Details of the building are drawn from illustrations in A. J. Bicknell's Detail, Cottage and Constructive Architecture, published in 1873. An entrance gate (now demolished) with similar features was constructed at the same time. It is unclear whether the building was ever actually used as a gatekeeper's lodge. By 1885 the house was used as a residence for some privileged women patients. It was later used by hospital staff families for a number of years. In the early 1960s the house was restored, and became a museum.

== Description ==
The gatehouse is a two-story, Late Victorian cottage with a gable roof. The house has an L-shaped front section, and a rear ell. The exterior is clad with board-and-batten siding. The gables and porch are decorated with Swiss-inspired and Eastlake ornamentation. The porch and bay window also have decorative trim.
