= John Fitch (classicist) =

Classicist, professor

- Occupations: Scholar, translator, poet

Academic background
- Education: King's College, Cambridge; Cornell University

Academic work
- Institutions: University of Victoria
- Main interests: Roman poetry, poetry of knowledge, Senecan drama
- Website: www.johngfitch.com

John Gordon Fitch is a classical scholar. He works chiefly on Roman poetry, especially Lucretius and the dramas of Seneca, and his interests also include Greek and Roman texts on agriculture and medicine. He is a professor emeritus at the University of Victoria.

== Education ==
He was educated at East Ham Grammar School, London, and King's College, Cambridge. He received his undergraduate degree from Cambridge University (1965) and his Ph.D. from Cornell University (1974).

== Career ==
Fitch was assistant professor at Ball State University (1972–73), and was then appointed at the University of Victoria, where he progressed to associate professor and then professor and chair in the Department of Greek and Roman Studies. He became professor emeritus on retirement from the university in 1999.

In 1981 he proposed a new relative dating of Seneca's dramas, based on the structure of the iambic trimeter. This was followed by a detailed edition with commentary of Seneca's Hercules, and simultaneously by a study of the anapaestic verses in the dramas (both 1987). Later came an edition of all the dramas in the bilingual Loeb Classical Library, accompanied by a separate textual commentary (both 2004). He has also written on the construction of selfhood and on the meaningful use of proper names in the dramas.

Fitch is also interested in the poetry of knowledge, particularly that of Lucretius and Vergil. In 2018 he published The Poetry of Knowledge and the ‘Two Cultures’, which examines the interrelationship of knowledge and poetry across a wide range of literature from antiquity to the twenty-first century, and argues for their compatibility.

He has also published an illustrated translation of Palladius' Opus Agriculturae. In 2022 he published the first English translation of On Simples, a Greek medicinal text of the first century A.D., traditionally (though wrongly) attributed to Dioscorides. Separately he published discussions of textual issues in each of these works.

== Selected works ==
- Seneca's Hercules Furens: A Critical Text with Introduction and Commentary, Ithaca & London: Cornell University Press, 1987, ISBN 0-8014-1876-3
- Seneca's Anapaests. Metre, Colometry, Text and Artistry in the Anapaests of Seneca's Tragedies, Atlanta: Scholars Press, 1987, ISBN 1-555-40214-3
- Seneca, Tragedies (Loeb Classical Library), Cambridge, Mass.: Harvard University Press. Vol. 1, 2002; vol. 2, 2004. Both volumes revised 2018.
- Annaeana Tragica: Notes on the Text of Seneca's Tragedies, Leiden & Boston: Brill, 2004, ISBN 90-04-14003-4
- Oxford Readings in Classical Studies: Seneca (editor), Oxford: Oxford University Press, 2008, ISBN 978-0-19-928209-8
- Palladius: The Work of Farming (translator), Totnes: Prospect Books, 2013, ISBN 978-1-903018-92-7
- The Poetry of Knowledge and the ‘Two Cultures’, Palgrave Macmillan 2018, ISBN 978-3-319-89559-8
- On Simples, Attributed to Dioscorides: Introduction, Translation, Concordances, Leiden & Boston: Brill, 2022, ISBN 978-90-04-51371-6
