= Fitch Ratings =

American credit rating agency

Fitch Ratings, Inc.
- Company type: Subsidiary
- Industry: Financial services
- Founded: 1913; 113 years ago
- Founder: John Knowles Fitch
- Headquarters: Manhattan, US; London, UK
- Key people: Paul Taylor (CEO of Fitch Group); Ian Linnell (president of Fitch Ratings and Fitch Ratings, Inc.); Rachel Lojko (president of Fitch Solutions); Tracey Perini (CFO)
- Revenue: ▲$1.7 Billion
- Number of employees: 5,000 (approximate)
- Parent: Hearst Corporation
- Website: fitchratings.com

Fitch Ratings, Inc. is an American–British credit rating agency. It is one of the three nationally recognized statistical rating organizations (NRSRO) designated by the U.S. Securities and Exchange Commission and is considered as being one of the "Big Three credit rating agencies", along with Moody's and S&P Global Ratings.

== History ==
Fitch Ratings is dual headquartered in New York and London. Hearst owns 100 percent of the company following its acquisition of an additional 20 percent for $2.8 billion on April 12, 2018. Hearst had owned 80 percent of the company after increasing its ownership stake by 30 percent on December 12, 2014, in a transaction valued at $1.965 billion. Hearst's previous equity interest was 80 percent following expansions on an original acquisition of 20 percent interest in 2006.

Hearst had jointly owned Fitch with FIMALAC SA, which held 20 percent of the company until the 2018 transaction. Fitch Ratings and Fitch Solutions are part of the Fitch Group.

The firm was founded by John Knowles Fitch on December 24, 1914, in New York City as the Fitch Publishing Company. In 1989, the company was acquired by a group including Robert Van Kampen. In 1997, Fitch was acquired by FIMALAC and was merged with London-based IBCA Limited, a FIMALAC subsidiary. In 2000, Fitch acquired both Chicago-based Duff & Phelps Credit Rating Co. (April) and Thomson Financial BankWatch (December).

Fitch Ratings is the third largest NRSRO rating agency, covering a more limited share of the market than S&P and Moody's, though it has grown with acquisitions and frequently positions itself as a "tie-breaker" when the other two agencies have ratings similar, but not equal, in scale.

In September 2011, Fitch Group announced the sale of Algorithmics (risk analytics software) to IBM for $387 million.

In June 2022, Fitch Group acquired GeoQuant, an AI-driven data and technology company.

== Operations ==
Fitch Ratings is a subsidiary of Fitch Group, a holding company wholly owned by Hearst Communications. Fitch Group also operates Fitch Solutions, a distribution channel for Fitch Ratings products and a provider of credit market data and financial analytics. Fitch Group employs approximately 5,000 people, including over 1,600 analysts. Paul Taylor is president and chief executive officer of Fitch Group. Fitch Ratings is registered as a nationally recognized statistical rating organization (NRSRO). The firm has more than 2,400 employees. Ian Linnell is president of Fitch Ratings.

== Criticism ==
The main credit rating agencies, including Fitch, were accused of misrepresenting the risks associated with mortgage-related securities, which included the collateralized debt obligation (CDO) market. There were large losses in the CDO market that occurred despite being assigned top ratings by the CRAs.

For instance, losses on $340.7 million worth of collateralized debt obligations (CDO) issued by Credit Suisse Group added up to about $125 million, despite being rated AAA by Fitch. However, differently from the other agencies, Fitch was warning the market on the constant proportion debt obligations (CPDO) with an early and pre-crisis report highlighting the dangers of CPDOs in 2007.

== See also ==
- FIMALAC
- Kroll Bond Rating Agency
- List of countries by credit rating
- Moody's Investors Service
- Spread Research
- Standard and Poor's
