= Dr. Nathan M. Thomas House =

- U.S. National Register of Historic Places
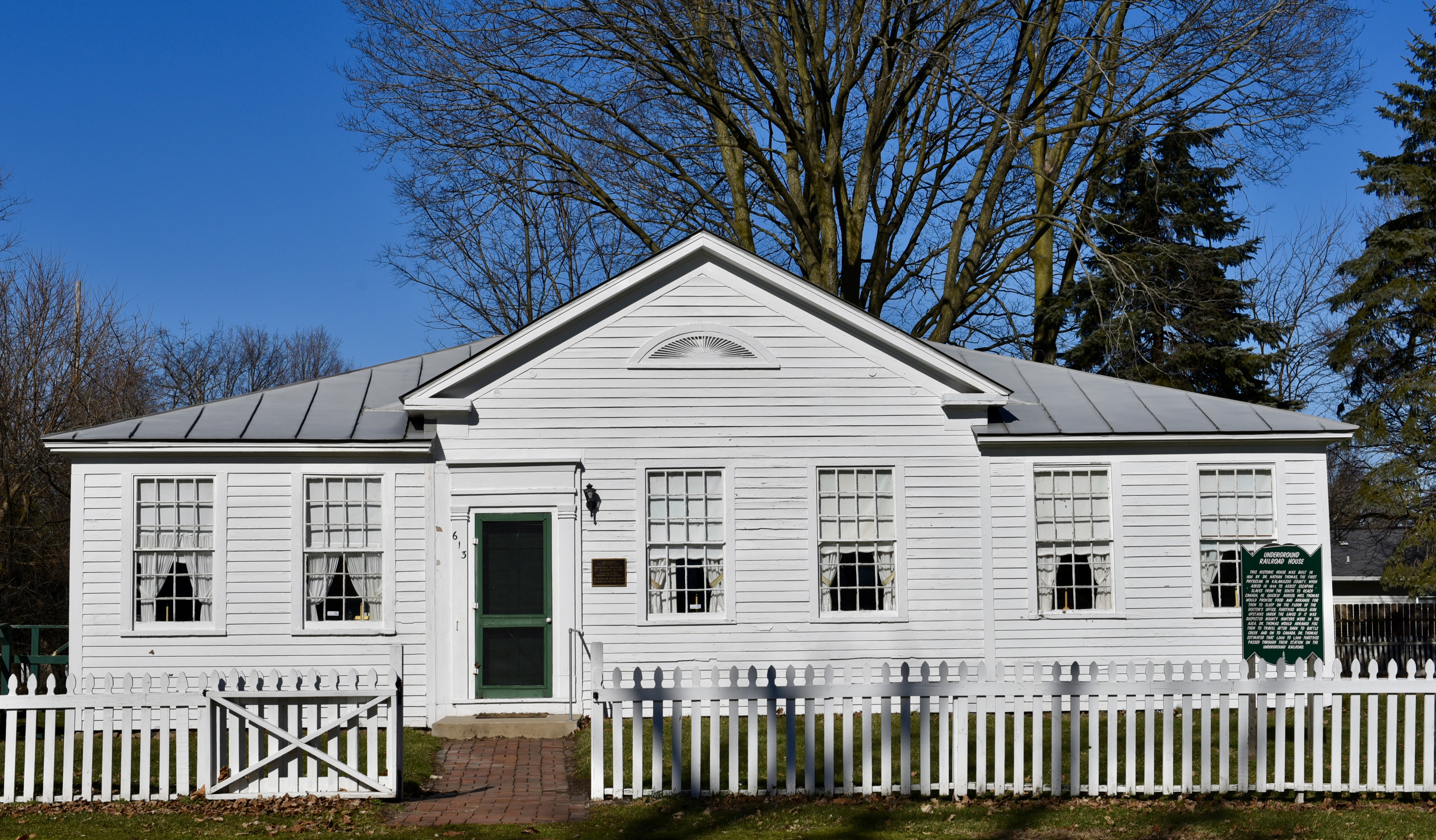
- Interactive map
- Location: 613 E. Cass St., Schoolcraft, Michigan
- Coordinates: 42°06′59″N 85°37′47″W
- Area: less than one acre
- Built: 1835
- Architectural style: Greek Revival, Federal
- NRHP reference No.: 82002843
- Added to NRHP: April 22, 1982

The Dr. Nathan M. Thomas House is a single-family home located at 613 East Cass Street in Schoolcraft, Michigan. The house is also known as the Underground Railway House, due to its use as a stop in the Underground Railroad. It was listed on the National Register of Historic Places in 1982.

== History ==
Dr. Nathan M. Thomas was born in 1803 in Mount Pleasant, Ohio, the son of Quaker parents. He studied medicine at the Medical College of Ohio in Cincinnati, graduating in 1828. He opened a practice in Columbiana County, Ohio, then moved to Prairie Ronde Township in Kalamazoo County in 1830, becoming the first physician in the county. He settled in the then-new village of Schoolcraft in about 1833. In 1835 he built the original section of this house near the center of the village, consisting of a doctor's office in front and a "dwelling room" in the rear. In 1840, Thomas married Pamela S. Brown. To make room for a new family, the Thomases had the house moved backward from the street and added wings on each side of the original section.

As the population of Kalamazoo County grew, Dr. Thomas's practice thrived, and by the time of his marriage he was beginning to invest money in land. This business proved more lucrative than medicine, and by 1853, Thomas had discontinued his practice to concentrate on his real estate holdings.

The Thomases lived in the house until 1867 or 1868, when they had a new house constructed. The 1835 frame house was moved from its original location near the center of town to the current location on Cass Street to make way for the new house. The Thomases constructed a three-story brick Italianate home on the original lot, and lived there the remainder of their lives. Nathan M. Thomas died in 1887; Pamela S. Thomas died in 1909.

At some point one of the 1840 wings was removed. In 1975, the Schoolcraft Bicentennial Committee purchased the house, and the Schoolcraft Historical Society was organized to oversee restoration. The Society raised funds to restore the house to its appearance in the 1840s, including replacing the demolished wing.

== Underground Railroad ==
Nathan Thomas was a staunch abolitionist, and was well known in the community for his views. In fact, the surrounding area in southwest Michigan was home to a large number of Quakers like Thomas, many of whom held similar views. Even before he constructed his house, fugitives from slavery would call on him for assistance. After the Thomas house was enlarged in 1840, Nathan and Pamela Thomas sheltered small groups of fugitives on their way to Detroit. When the Underground Railroad became more organized in 1843, the house became a station on the route, with escaped slaves moving from Cass County to the Thomas House and on to Battle Creek. Between 1840 and 1860, the Thomases helped over a thousand fugitive slaves on their way to freedom.

== Description ==
The Thomas house is a single-story rectangular Greek Revival house with Federal-style elements. It is divided into three sections: an 1835 end gable section in the center, and two hipped roof sections on either side. The house has a thin cornice with returns, and double-hung windows with 12-pane sashes. It is clad in clapboard. The center section is 28 feet deep and 20 feet wide. The wings are 12-1/2 feet wide and 42 feet deep.
