= Henderson Park (Henderson, Texas) =

Baseball park

Coordinates: 32.1494°N 94.7952°W

- Interactive map of Henderson Park
- Full name: Henderson Park
- Location: Henderson, Texas

Tenants
- Henderson Oilers (East Texas League) (1931, 1936-1940, 1946, 1949-1950) (Dixie League) (1933) (West Dixie League) (1934-1935) (Lone Star League) (1947-1948)

Henderson Park was a baseball park located in Henderson, TX and was the home to many Henderson baseball teams over the course of the facility. The remnants of the ballpark still exist and can be viewed behind the ancient middle school at Fair Park Street and South High Street.

== Sources ==
- "Texas Almanac 2008-2009," The Dallas Morning News, c.2008
