= Kalamazoo station (Grand Rapids and Indiana Railroad) =

Former railway station in Michigan, United States

Coordinates: 42°17′35″N 85°34′43″W

Kalamazoo
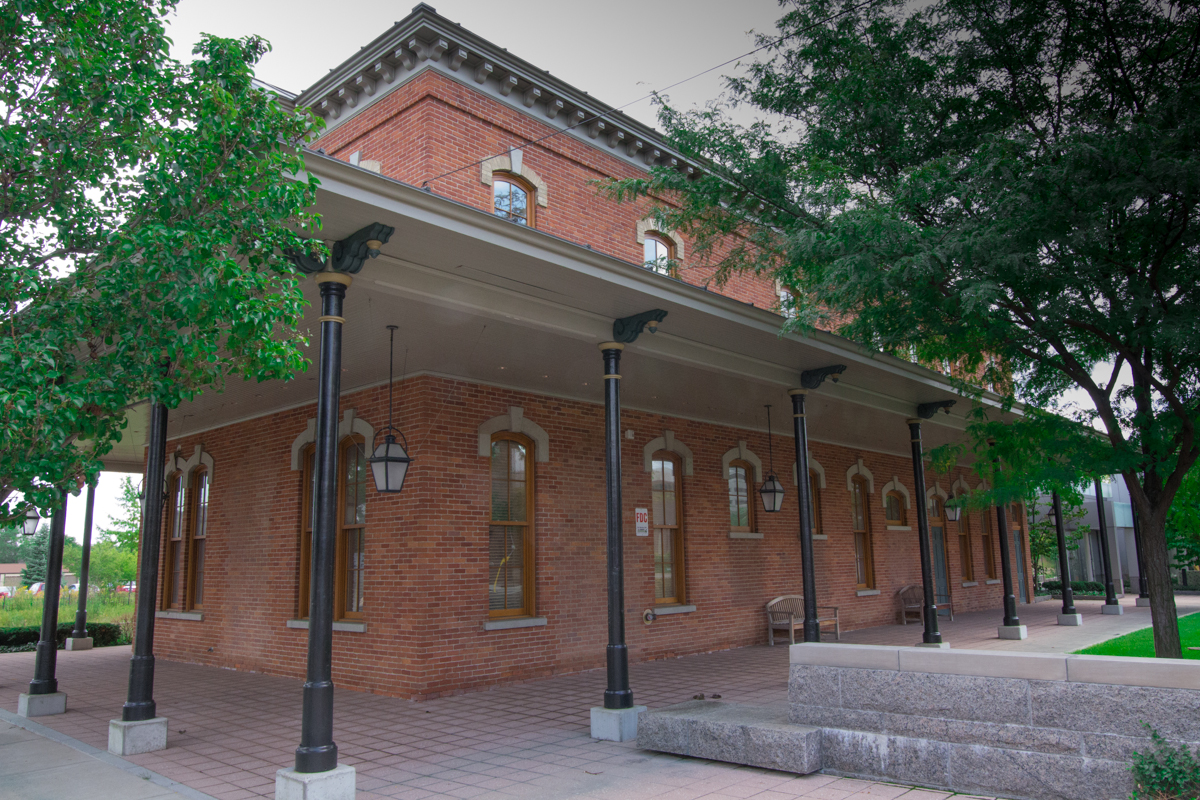
- The station building in 2014

General information
- Location: 402 East Michigan Ave. Kalamazoo, Michigan

History
- Opened: 1870
- Rebuilt: 1874
- Original company: Grand Rapids and Indiana Railroad

Former services
Preceding station	Pennsylvania Railroad	Following station
Wayland toward Mackinaw City	Grand Rapids & Indiana Railway	Vicksburg toward Richmond

Michigan State Historic Site
- Designated: March 2, 1976

Kalamazoo station is one of five former railway station in Kalamazoo, Michigan. The original station was built on the site in 1870 by the Grand Rapids and Indiana Railroad. A fire destroyed the building in 1874 and the present structure was built as its replacement. It was later used by the Pennsylvania Railroad and saw passenger service as a stop of the Northern Arrow.

The building was designated a Michigan State Historic Site on March 2, 1976.

The station building is designed in an Italian Revival style.
