= Joseph Bearwalker Wilson =

Joseph Bearwalker Wilson (1942–2004) was a shaman and witch. He founded the 1734 Tradition of witchcraft and created Metista spiritual system, which later developed into the Toteg Tribe. He was also a founding member of the Covenant of the Goddess.

Wilson was born December 11, 1942, and raised just inside the city limits of St. Johns in Clinton County, Michigan. He grew up with some Christian influence, but developed an early interest in the occult and in fully utilizing the powers of the mind, which he felt were barely tapped. During his early adult life he studied comparative religion, which encouraged his teaching: "what they all have in common must be close to the truth." He died on August 4, 2004, from complications of chronic obstructive pulmonary disease.

== Air Force career and spirituality ==
Wilson joined the Air Force in September 1961, and in autumn 1962, another airman named Sean (whom he does not identify by last name) introduced him to ritual practices designed to bring mental focus. Sean's wife also taught Wilson the use of roots and herbs to perform magic spells. Wilson felt the spiritual awareness that Sean presented was similar to, but not the same as witchcraft. Sean also recommended readings to him, of which the most influential were The White Goddess by Robert Graves, The Magic Arts in Celtic Britain by Lewis Spence, and The Golden Bough by Sir James George Frazer. However, Wilson found Sean's practical teachings more valuable than these written works.

In 1964, Wilson started a four-page newsletter, The Waxing Moon, which he considered to be "a journal of the old religion" or "a witchcraft newsletter." In 1970, this newsletter became the official journal of The Pagan Movement in Britain and Ireland which he founded together with Tony Kelly as outlined in his editorial to the first issue of the new series. In 1965, an advertisement for Pentagram in The Waxing Moon put him in contact with Roy Bowers, alias "Robert Cochrane," with whom he studied by mail until Bowers' death in 1966. Copies of their letters can be found online. Wilson founded the "1734 Tradition" in late 1973 and early 1974 when he compiled the Flags, Flax and Fodder booklet. He also participated in the formation of the Covenant of the Goddess, eventually leaving following their insistence that he adopt the Wiccan Rede.

== OSI agent ==
In 1971, Wilson served as a staff sergeant, stationed at Lakenheath, England. He became a "secret agent" for the Air Force Office of Special Investigations, spying upon his fellow servicemen who were working from within the military to protest American involvement in the Vietnam War. Wilson's testimony against Air Force Captain Thomas Culver led to the latter's court martial. Subsequently, writers in the Neo-Pagan and Wicca communities of the time branded Wilson as a "warlock" or traitor to paganism.

Wilson has said that he spent most of 1971 and 1972 in a "blur" caused by alcoholism. After his testimony against captain Culver, he received "hate mail" from the pagan community. He recalled:

"Literally hundreds of letters from people throughout the United States and England. [...] 95% of those letters condemned me. [...] People [...] wrote to tell me what a traitor I was and how much they hated me. Some of the letters threatened my life and the lives of my family. [...] I think this is when I started serious drinking. Tim Zell of the Church of All Worlds and Green Egg wrote something like, 'Joe, how could you. This is terrible. You could have gone down in history as an important founder of the pagan movement. Now you are nothing but a traitor.'"

== Toteg Tribe ==
The bulk of Wilson's work in his later life had to do with his shamanic walk. He created Metista, a spiritual system for non-native people that introduced the concept of interaction with the spirits of ancestry and land. The land was understood to belong not to an indigenous tribe but to the actual familial stream and current geographical location of the practitioner. Metista developed into Toteg Tribe, which is a fully enabled spiritual system consisting of interaction with Mother Earth, Father Sky, the genus loci of a person's geographical location, one's own familial ancestors, ancestors of culture, heritage and artistic, intellectual teachers. He also became a student of Catherine Yronwode, studying African American hoodoo folk magic, a tradition that he recommended to his own students in the Toteg Tribe.

The Toteg Tribe website may be found at Toteg Tribe The entire text of Wilson's book, "Nature Religion..." is contained on the page.
