= Kalamazoo Regional Psychiatric Hospital =

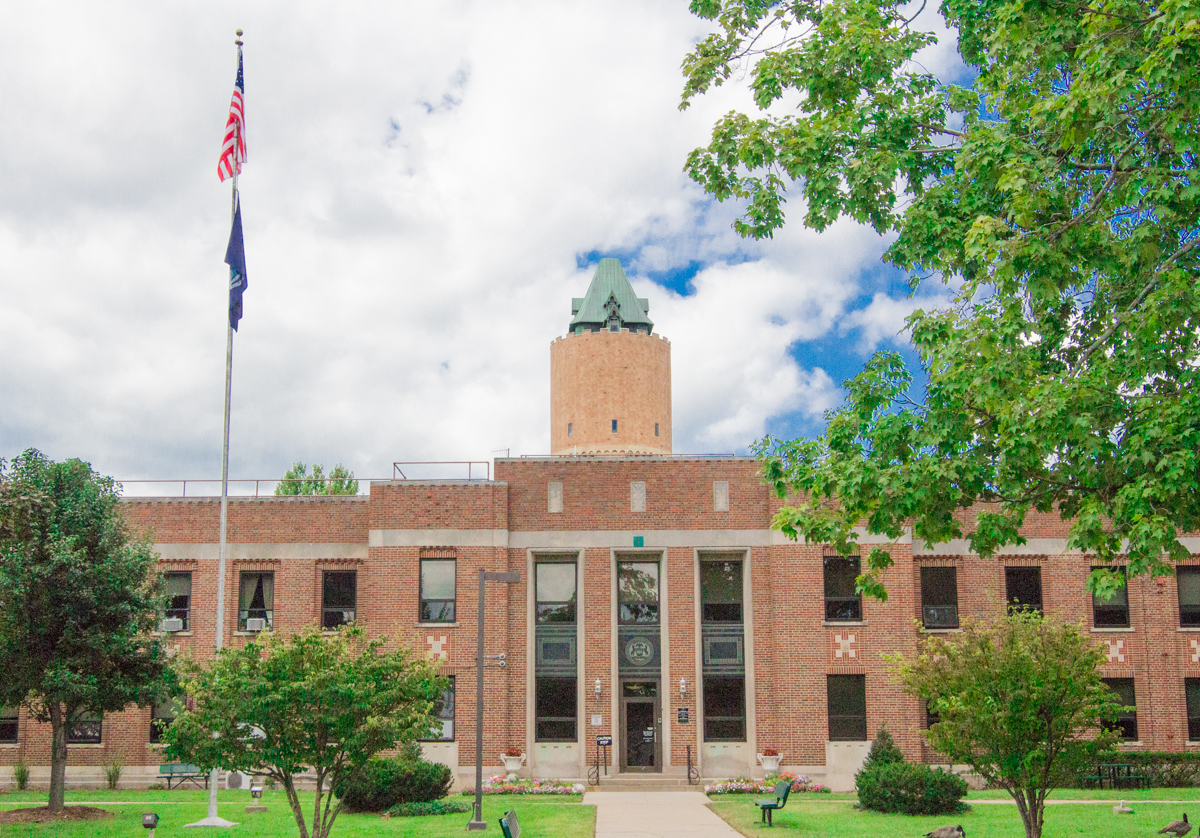
- The hospital in September 2014

Geography
- Location: Kalamazoo, Michigan, United States

History
- Opened: August 29, 1859

Links
- Lists: Hospitals in Michigan

The Kalamazoo Psychiatric Hospital (KRPH) is the largest mental health institution in Michigan. It was built under the Kirkbride Plan.

== History ==
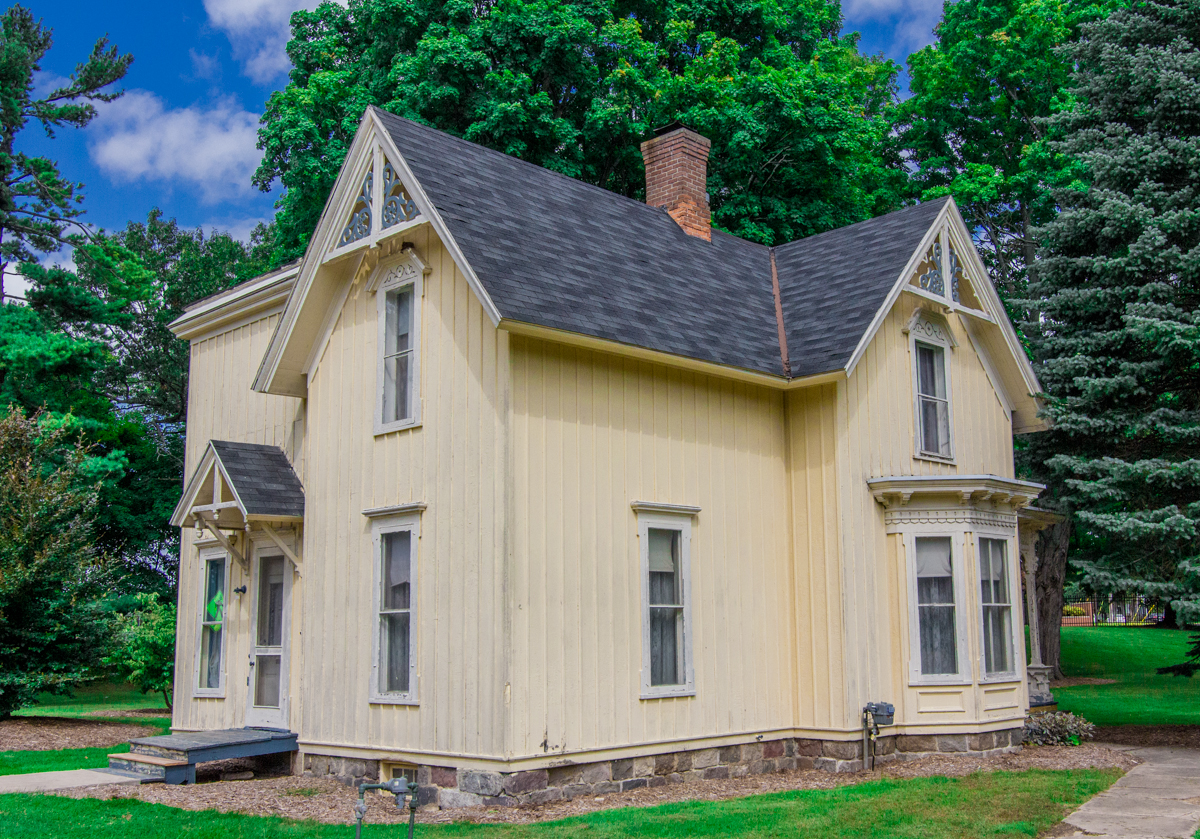
The historic gatehouse in front of the hospital

The Kalamazoo Regional Psychiatric Hospital officially opened on 29 August 1859 under the direction of Dr. Edwin Van Deusen, although three women patients had been admitted prior to that time. The first male patient was admitted in 1860. It was originally known as the 'Michigan Asylum for the Insane' and was renamed the 'Kalamazoo State Hospital' in 1911. Its name was changed to the 'Kalamazoo Regional Psychiatric Hospital' on 1 January 1978 and in July 1995 it assumed its present designation, the 'Kalamazoo Psychiatric Hospital'. Many local residents commonly referred it simply as the 'State Hospital'.

The facility has continuously expanded and is located on Oakland Drive, which was originally known as Asylum Avenue. It is bounded by Howard Street on the south, and by the campus of Western Michigan University on the north. Almost all the original and historic buildings have been demolished and new, modern ones have been built in their place. This includes the original hospital building, which originally was covered with vines and had a more pleasant appearance.

The water tower was designed by B.F. Stratton and was constructed in 1895 by contractor Benjamin Roe. It quickly became a local landmark and played prominently in the history of the city. In time, two working farms were opened for the care and rehabilitation of patients and were located about 3 miles (4.8 km) to the north and south of the main campus.

Another landmark on the main campus is the 'gate cottage' situated near Oakland Drive at the entrance to the hospital grounds. The gatehouse is 'carpenter gothic' in style, featuring board and batten siding, a steep roof and 'gingerbread' ornamentation. The house had been furnished with Victorian furniture and now serves as a museum. When first built, it was used as the porter's residence and later housed 12 women patients for a time.

== Notable people ==
=== Patients ===
- Louise Little (1894-7–1989), activist and mother of Malcolm X; admitted after a mental breakdown and released by her children 24 years later
- Danny Arthur Ranes (1943–2022), serial killer; was admitted for 10 days after attempting suicide

=== Staff ===
- Jason E. Hammond (1862–1957), educator; was a trustee
- Bertha Van Hoosen (1863–1952), surgeon; trained at the hospital
- Cornelia B. Wilbur (1908–1992), psychiatrist; first female extern

== See also ==
- Kalamazoo State Hospital Water Tower

== Sources ==
- Marable, Manning (2011). Malcolm X: A Life of Reinvention. New York: Viking. ISBN 978-0-670-02220-5.
- Perry, Bruce (1991). Malcolm: The Life of a Man Who Changed Black America. Barrytown, New York: Station Hill. ISBN 978-0-88268-103-0.
