= Fitchburg, Kentucky =

Unincorporated community in Kentucky, United States

- Unincorporated community
- Location within the state of Kentucky
- Coordinates: 37°43′57″N 83°51′7″W
- Country: United States
- State: Kentucky
- County: Estill
- Elevation: 728 ft (222 m)
- Time zone: UTC-5 (Eastern (EST))
  - Summer (DST): UTC-4 (EDT)
- GNIS ID: 512177

Fitchburg is an unincorporated community in Estill County, Kentucky, United States.

== History ==
Fitchburg was named for Frank and Fred Fitch, two brothers who in 1869 started a blast furnace at the site. A post office was established at Fitchburg in 1870, and remained in operation until it was discontinued in 1955.
