= Alice Underwood Fitch =

American painter

Alice Underwood Fitch (July 5, 1862 – August 18, 1936) was an American painter born in Memphis, Tennessee. She was the daughter of William Haynes Fitch and Eleanora Underwood and grew up in Detroit, Michigan. She was briefly married to John Lynch.

Fitch went to France in 1900 to study and paint. She became especially noted for her work as a miniature painter. For over 20 years, she was in constant demand as a copyist of famous paintings in the Louvre and other French galleries.

In 1908, the French Government conferred the Ordre des Palmes Académiques on her.
