= Charles C. Fitch =

American politician (1842–1899)

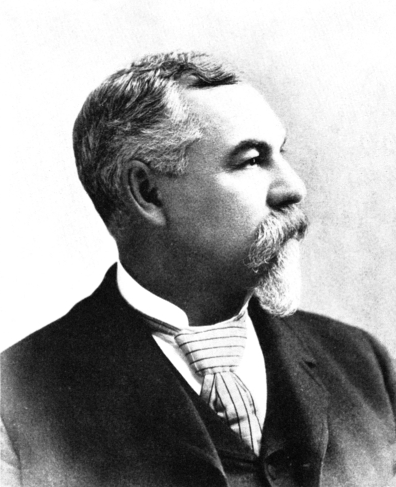

Member of the Michigan House of Representatives from the Ingham County 2nd district
- In office January 1, 1889 – December 31, 1892
- Preceded by: Marshall E. Rumsey
- Succeeded by: Job T. Campbell

Personal details
- Born: July 19, 1842 Cuylerville, New York
- Died: June 28, 1899 (aged 56)
- Party: Democratic
- Spouse: Mary Kate Clark (m. 1876)
- Education: Michigan Agricultural College

Charles Carroll Fitch (July 19, 1842 – June 28, 1899) was an American politician.

== Early life and education ==
Charles C. Fitch was born on July 19, 1842, in Cuylerville, New York. In 1848, Charles' father, Ferris S. Fitch, settled in Bunker Hill Township, Michigan. Ferris was one of the largest landowners in Bunker Hill Township, and had extensive farming interests. Charles was first educated at the district schools of Bunker Hill Township, and later studied at the Michigan Agricultural College.

== Career ==
After graduating from college, Fitch moved to Mason. Fitch was initially a farmer. From 1863 to 1865, Fitch stopped farming and began working in the Ingham County abstract office, and also served as the Deputy Register of Deeds for the county. After this period, Fitch returned to farming until 1875. Fitch ran the county abstract office from 1878 to the summer of 1886. In 1884, Fitch was elected Register of Deeds, and was re-elected in 1886. Fitch also served twelve years on the Mason Board of Education and as president of the Mason Water and Electric Lights Company.

In October 1888, Fitch was unanimously nominated in the Democratic convention for the Michigan House of Representatives seat represented the Ingham County 2nd district. In the general election on November 6, 1888, Fitch won election against Republican nominee Henry L. Henderson. Fitch was renominated for the same position in October 1890, by a convention in Dansville. He won re-election in November, against Republican nominee H. Rix Jr. Fitch did not seek re-election in 1892.

== Personal life ==
In 1876, Fitch married Mary Kate Clark. Together, they had one daughter, Fannie. On February 22, 1900, Fannie married Alva M. Cummins, a prominent lawyer. Fitch was a Freemason. Charles' brother, Ferris S. Fitch Jr., served as Michigan Superintendent of Public Instruction.

== Death ==
Fitch died on June 28, 1899, suddenly of heart disease. At Fitch's funeral, his eulogy was delivered by Lawton T. Hemans.
