= John Knowles Fitch =

American economist

- Born: John Knowles Fitch; February 15, 1880; Bridgeport, Connecticut, U.S.
- Died: June 5, 1969 (aged 89); Easton, Pennsylvania
- Education: Columbia University (BA)
- Occupation: Businessman
- Known for: Founding the Fitch Publishing Company
- Spouse: Lillian Whitehead
- Children: 3

John Knowles Fitch (February 15, 1880 – July 5, 1969) was the founder of the Fitch Publishing Company, and developed a financial securities rating system from AAA to D. Fitch ratings are used as a tool in the business of credit rating, usually behind Moody's ratings and Standard & Poor's ratings.

== Biography ==
Fitch's father was Francis Emory Fitch (September 15, 1850 – 1910), his mother was Cornelia Knowles (graduated Vassar College 1873). He was born in Bridgeport, Connecticut and while he was still a child, his parents moved to Brooklyn, New York, where they remained until 1891. They moved at that time to Passaic, New Jersey. He attended the Friends School in Brooklyn, and later the public school of Passaic. Following his graduation from Columbia University, which he entered in June 1902, he married Lillian L. Whitehead on June 15, 1905. She was the daughter of Reverend M. J. H. Whitehead, pastor of the North Reformed Church of Passaic, New Jersey. They resided in Passaic for several years, and then took up residence in Upper Montclair, New Jersey.

Shortly after his graduation from Columbia, Fitch bought a well-known florist shop located on Broadway and 22nd Street in New York City. He took correspondence courses in a variety of subjects, including advertising.

Following the death of Mallory Knowles Fitch, his elder brother, John Fitch sold his florist business and worked with his father in the printing business at 47 Broad Street, New York City. After the death of his father in 1910, the business was incorporated under the name of Francis Emory Smith Inc., and was located in the Fitch Building at 138 Pearl Street, near the corner of Wall Street in New York City. Upon the incorporation of this company, John Knowles Fitch became its president. On December 24, 1913, Fitch founded a new corporation named The Fitch Publishing Company, Inc. of which he was president. The main offices of this company were also located in the Fitch Building.

Among the Fitch Publishing Company's publications were the Fitch Bond Book, the Fitch Stock and Bond Manual, and other services furnishing daily and weekly statistics on the New York Stock Exchange and the American and Canadian corporate security field.

Fitch was president of the Alumni Federation of Columbia University, and during World War I aroused interest among his classmates to raise funds to purchase and equip an ambulance to be sent to France for the soldiers. His hobbies included yachting and golfing. He sailed his yacht Bavois to the coast of Labrador to visit scenes made famous by Sir Wilfred Grenfell.

== Personal life ==
John Knowles Fitch and his wife, Lillian Whitehead, had three children: John Knowles Jr. (born April 17, 1906, died January 21, 1998); and twins Marjorie and Muriel (born 1907). He died on June 5, 1969, in Easton, Pennsylvania.

== Sources ==
- Fitch, Roscoe Conkling. History of the Fitch family A.D. 1400-1930: a record of the Fitches in England and America, including "pedigree of Fitch" certified by the College of Arms, London, England. Haverhill, Massachusetts: Record Pub. Co., 1930.
- The History of Fitch Ratings 2006.
