= Ferris S. Fitch Jr. =

American politician (1853–1920)

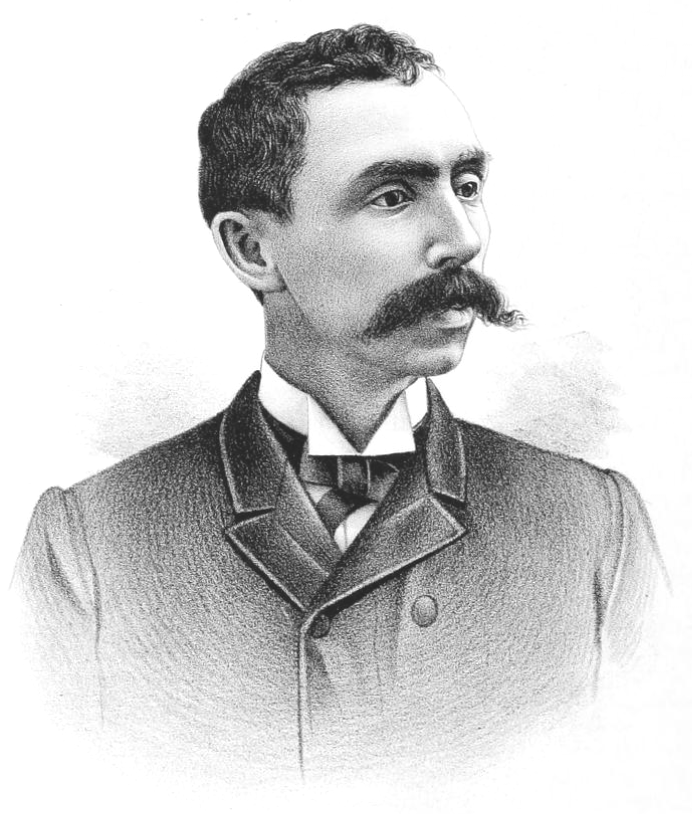

Michigan Superintendent of Public Instruction
- In office 1890–1892
- Preceded by: Joseph Estabrook
- Succeeded by: Henry R. Pattengill

Personal details
- Born: February 1, 1853 Bunker Hill Township, Michigan
- Died: January 21, 1920 (aged 66) Detroit, Michigan
- Party: Democratic
- Spouse: Lettie M. Humphrey (m. 1881; d. 1895)
- Education: Normal School at Ypsilanti; University of Michigan

Ferris S. Fitch Jr. (February 1, 1853 – January 21, 1920) was an American politician, educator, and journalist.

== Early life and education ==
Ferris S. Fitch Jr. was born on February 1, 1853, in Bunker Hill Township, Michigan. Ferris S. Fitch Sr. was one of the largest landowners in Bunker Hill Township, and had extensive farming interests. Ferris Jr. worked on his father's farm until he was 16 years old, when he started to attend the Normal School at Ypsilanti. Ferris graduated from a classical course at the school in 1873. Ferris served as an assistant Latin instructor during his senior year. Ferris then attended the University of Michigan and graduated with a Bachelor of Arts in 1877.

== Career ==
After graduating from university, Fitch became the chair of Latin and Greek at Smithson College in Indiana. He soon became president of the college. On February 1, 1878, Fitch became principal of Pontiac High School. As an educator, Fitch was an opponent of rote learning in favor of progressive education. Around 1881, Fitch was made Superintendent of the City Schools. In 1889, Elbert J. Kelly sold an Oakland County newspaper known as the Bill Poster to a stock company headed by Fitch. Fitch resigned as the City Schools Superintendent in June 1890 to enter journalism as the editor and manager of the newspaper he owned, which had its name changed from the Bill Poster to the Post.

On September 10, 1890, Fitch was unanimously nominated by the Democratic Convention in Grand Rapids for the office of Michigan Superintendent of Public Instruction. The nomination was made by University of Michigan Regent C. R. Whitman. In the November general election, Fitch defeated Republican nominee Orr Shurtz. In August 1892, Fitch was again nominated by the Democrats for Public Instruction Superintendent. In the November general election, Fitch was defeated by the Republican nominee, Henry R. Pattengill.

On September 1, 1895, Fitch relinquished his holdings in the Post to Harry Coleman.

== Personal life ==
Ferris S. Fitch was the brother of State Representative Charles C. Fitch. Ferris Fitch married Lettie M. Humphrey on August 4, 1881. Together, they had three children. Lettie died on February 27, 1895.

== Death ==
Fitch died on January 21, 1920, while visiting his daughter at her home in Detroit.
