= Silas W. Kendall House =

- U.S. National Register of Historic Places
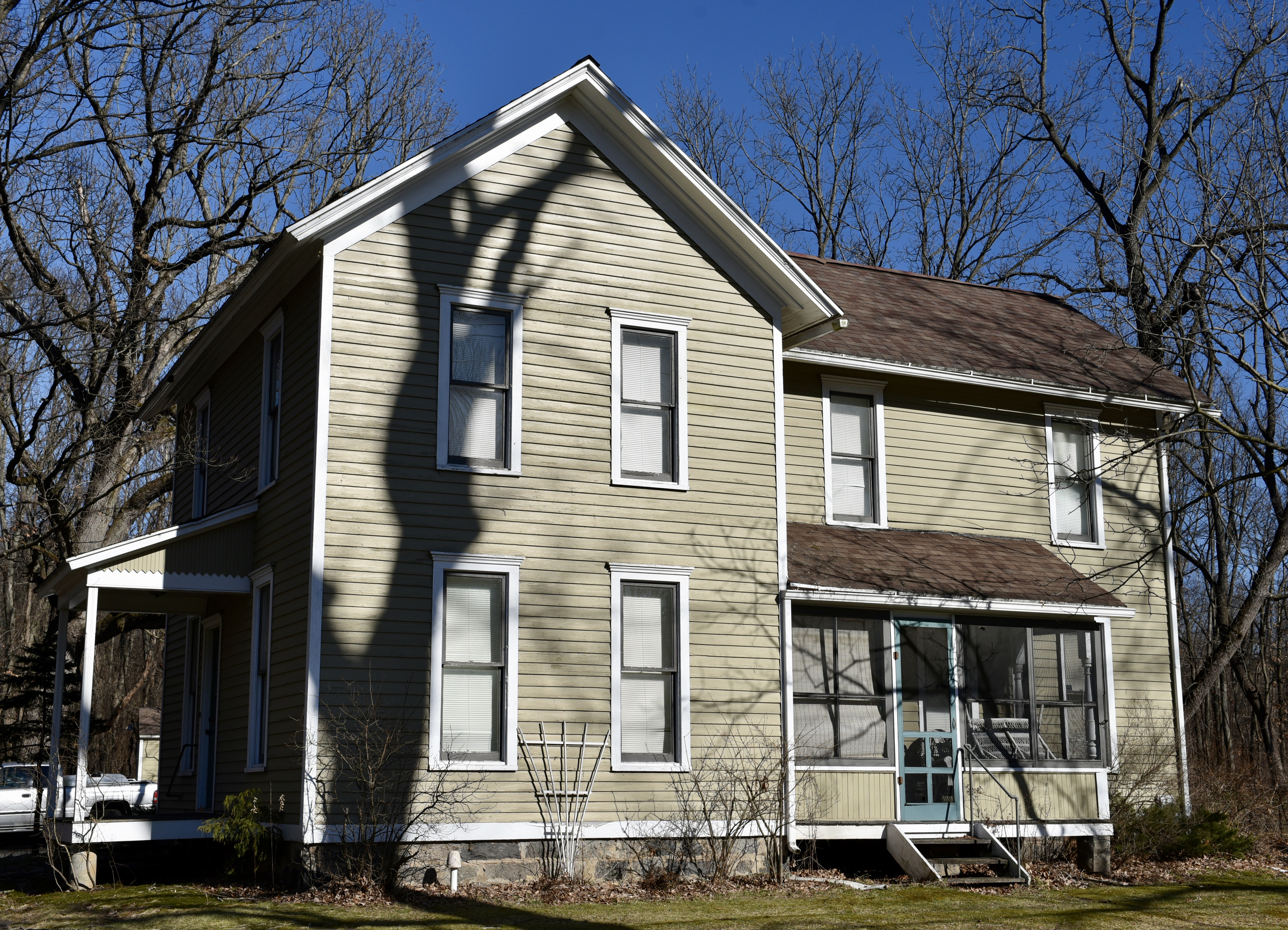
- Interactive map
- Location: 7540 Stadium Dr., Oshtemo Township, near Kalamazoo, Michigan
- Coordinates: 42°15′19″N 85°41′52″W
- Area: 2 acres (0.81 ha)
- Built: c. 1878
- Architectural style: Tri-gabled-ell
- NRHP reference No.: 90001958
- Added to NRHP: December 28, 1990

The Silas W. Kendall House was built as a single-family home, located at 7540 Stadium Drive in Oshtemo Township, near Kalamazoo, Michigan. It was listed on the National Register of Historic Places in 1990. As of 2019, it houses an architectural business.

== History ==
Homer S. Kendall was born in 1800 in Berkshire, Vermont, and moved to this part of Kalamazoo County in 1856. He purchased an 80-acre tract of land the section where this house is located was the first of the family to settle on this land, and settled here with his wife, Beulah Scott Kendall, and five children. Homer Kendall built a house for his family near here and began farming. One of his children was Silas W. Kendall, who was born in 1846 and moved with his parents. In 1873, Silas married Lucy S. Drummond, the daughter of a nearby farmer. Documents suggest that Silas constructed this house in 1878 in his father's land, but the exact construction date is uncertain. In any case, by the time of Homer Kendall's death in 1891, Silas was well-established, and inherited the 80 acres previously owned by his father. Both Silas and Lucy Kendall lived here until their deaths: his in 1925 and hers in 1940. After 1940, their only child, E. Vernon Kendall, inherited the property. He farmed and lived here for his entire life, until 1968. The property suffered neglect for years after that, but was purchased and refurbished in 1990 to house a small business and an upstairs rental unit.

== Description ==
The Silas W. Kendall House is a two-story, gabled-ell former farmhouse covered with clapboard. It has broadly overhanging eaves with plain raking cornices, plain corner boards, and simple frieze boards. The windows are primarily narrow, double-hung, single-light, sash type units. A slant-roof porch, with Queen-Anne-style lathe-turned support posts fits in the angle between the upright and wing in front. The porch contains two entrances: one into the former living room in the wing and one into the former front parlor in the upright. A second porch is located on one side of the house. A one-and-one-half-story rear ell is likely original to the house.
