= Henderson Park-West Main Hill Historic District =

- U.S. National Register of Historic Places
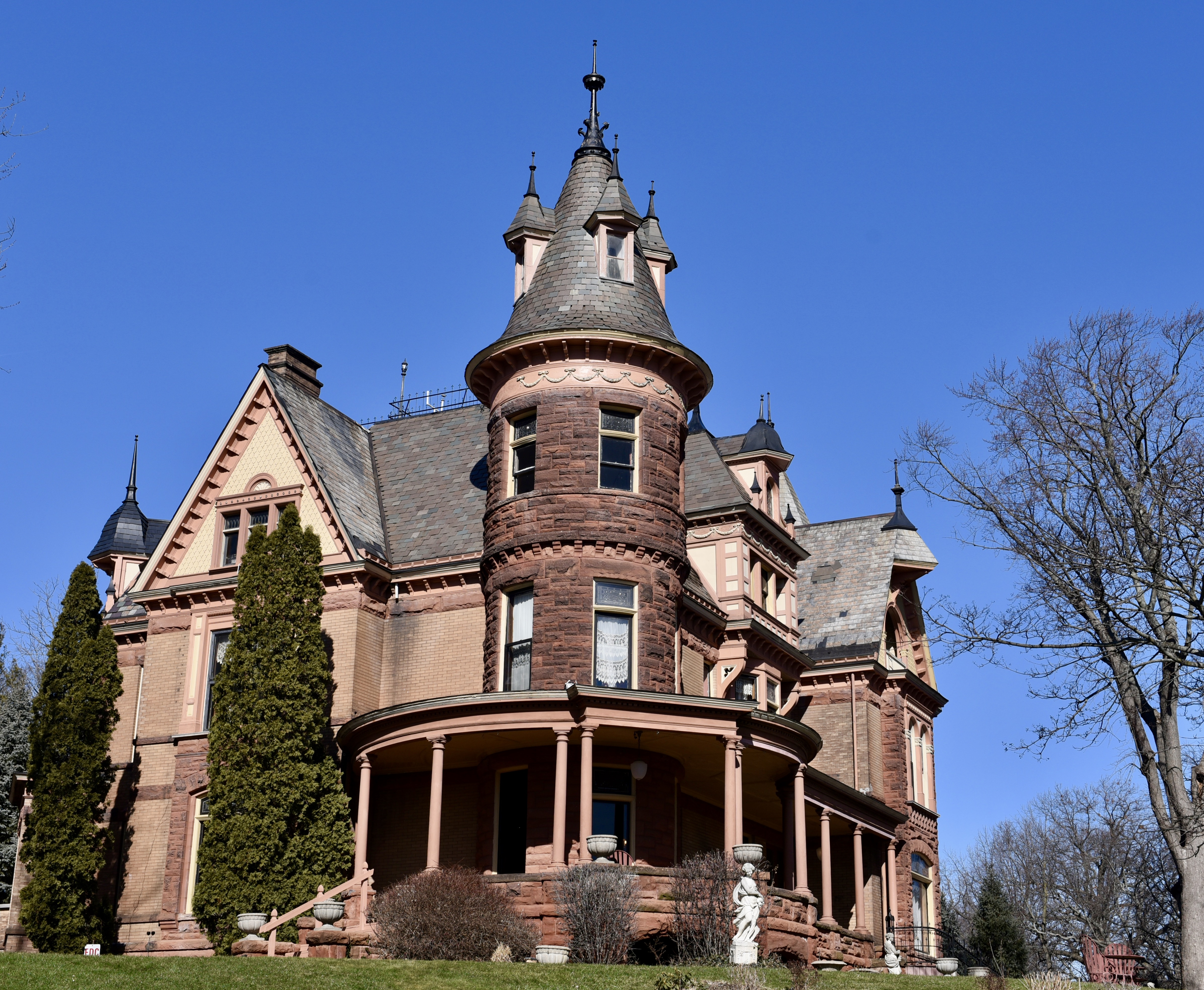
- Henderson Castle, 100 Monroe

- Location within Michigan Location within the United States
- Interactive map
- Location: Roughly bounded by W. Main, Thompson, Academy, Monroe, W. Lovell and Valley Sts. and Prairie Ave., Kalamazoo, Michigan
- Coordinates: 42°17′29″N 85°36′21″W
- Area: 52 acres (21 ha)
- Architectural style: Late 19th And Early 20th Century American Movements, Late 19th And 20th Century Revivals, Late Victorian
- NRHP reference No.: 95000871
- Added to NRHP: July 21, 1995

The Henderson Park-West Main Hill Historic District is a primarily residential historic district roughly bounded by West Main, Thompson, Academy, Monroe, West Lovell and Valley Streets and Prairie Avenue in Kalamazoo, Michigan. The district was listed on the National Register of Historic Places in 1995.

== History ==
In the 1850s, much of the land in the current district was owned by farmer James Taylor. Taylor apparently platted part of it in 1852, but there was little development, as the area was uphill and inconvenient to access from Kalamazoo. Taylor's daughter eventually married Frank Henderson. Henderson had arrived in Kalamazoo in 1855 and started a saddlery in 1864. In 1874, he began a business making uniform and regalia business, including Masonic regalia, which proved more lucrative than the saddle-making business. In the later 1800s, Kalamazoo grew outwards toward Taylor's lands, now owned by Henderson and his wife. By 1888, horse trams were introduced, making the area suddenly more accessible. Henderson decided to replat the area, and hired surveyor Frank Hodgman and civil engineer George S. Pierson to lay out a series of curvilinear streets.

In 1890–1894, Henderson built his own "castle," bringing the area to prominence in Kalamazoo's society. However, lots in the area were slow to sell until after the turn of the century, when Kalamazoo's business boom brought increased pressure on housing. The simultaneous growth of Kalamazoo College and the founding of Western Normal School (now Western Michigan University), both quite near the neighborhood, ensured the success of the area, with the lots substantially filled by the 1920s. Early residents of the area included professors from both Kalamazoo College and Western Michigan University, as well as small business owners and other professionals.

== Description ==
The Henderson Park-West Main Hill Historic District contains 140 buildings constructed in the late nineteenth and early twentieth century. The neighborhood is set on curved, tree-lined, hilly streets, with buildings set back from the road. Nearly all of the buildings are single family residences, built for high-status families and primarily in early twentieth-century period revival architectural styles. One school is also in the district, as well as two parks. The houses are of similar scale and style, widely separated from one another.
