= YMCA Camp Fitch on Lake Erie =

Summer camp in Springfield, Pennsylvania

YMCA Camp Fitch
- To help children grow in Spirit, Mind and Body
- Interactive map of YMCA Camp Fitch
- Location: Springfield Township, Erie County, Pennsylvania, USA
- Coordinates: 42.004°N 80.431°W
- Annual attendance: 19,000
- Operated by: YMCA of Youngstown, Ohio
- Established: 1914
- Website: www.campfitchymca.org

YMCA Camp Fitch is a year-round camp in North Springfield, Pennsylvania, owned and operated by the YMCA of Youngstown, Ohio. Prior to 1914, all summer camps operated by the YMCA of Youngstown were experimental and temporary in nature. Since its founding in 1914, Camp Fitch has hosted campers every year to date. Originally a program of the YMCA's downtown branch, Camp Fitch now exists as a YMCA branch owned by the YMCA of Youngstown.

While it began as a seasonal camp, Fitch now has the capability to operate throughout the year, owing in part to a campaign to expand its land holdings and facilities starting in the 1960s. During the summer months it operates as a traditional summer camp, with most of its campers staying for week-long sessions. When summer camp is not in session, the camp runs an outdoor education program for schools and hosts several weekend groups and conferences.

== History ==
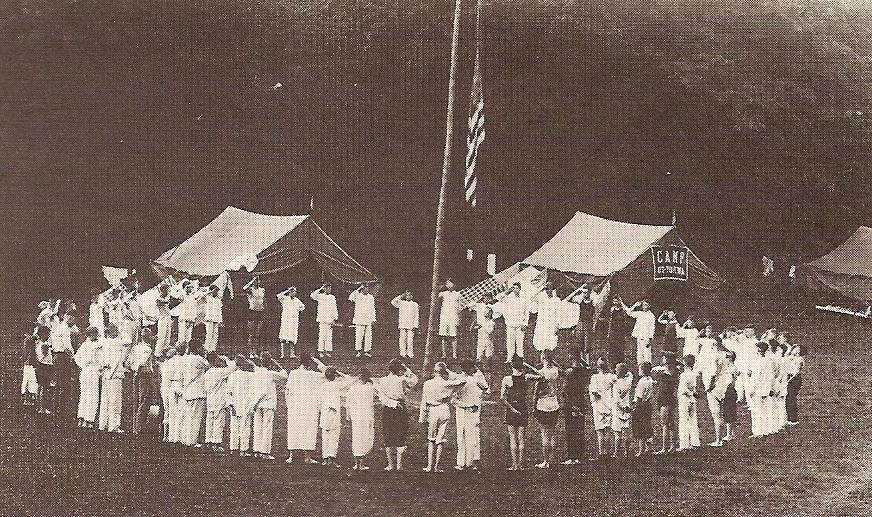
The Little Beaver camp site

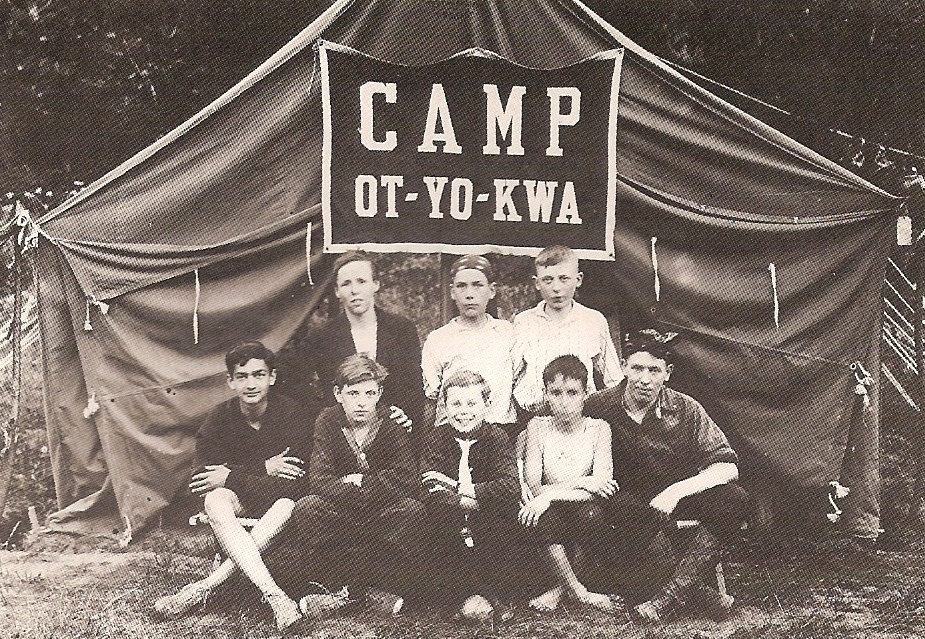
A tent group at the old Little Beaver camp site

The Youngstown YMCA began hosting camps for young boys in the early 1900s, the first of which was conducted at Muddy Lake near Ravenna, Ohio in 1906. In 1907, the camp was moved to Grand River between Orwell and Ashtabula and the following year the camp was moved to a site on Lake Erie between Saybrook and Geneva-on-the-Lake.

In 1914 the Board of Trustees of the Youngstown YMCA adopted a permanent policy of conducting a summer camp for boys. The campsite in 1914 was established at Cannon's Mills on Little Beaver River. Land for the camp was donated by John H. Fitch in addition to a sum of money sufficient to operate the camp for a five-year period. Thirty-two campers were enrolled for the first year, and the camp continued to operate at that site for the summers of 1915, 1916 and 1917. During these first years, a common fashion accessory for campers was a forked stick; these had to be carried for protection due to the abundance of rattlesnakes and copperheads in the area. Fortunately, this reptilian problem was rectified through the relocation of the camp grounds.

During the summer of 1919, a $5,600 dam was built to improve swimming and boating facilities; however, in spring of 1920, the dam gave way to a flood and for the next three seasons the camp used a wooden dam constructed by campers and their families.

Due to growing enrollment, in 1918 the camp was moved to West Point, also on Little Beaver River. At the close of the 1918 camping season, the family of the late John H. Fitch donated $10,000 to purchase the West Point camp site and make permanent improvements. The property consisted of 26 acres (110,000 m^{2}) of land and a lodge. The total purchase price was $4,500. In gratitude, the Board of Trustees passed a resolution changing the name of the camp from Ot-Yo-Kwa to Camp John H. Fitch.

In 1923, the camp once again reached its capacity at eight tents and one ball diamond. A 93-acre (380,000 m^{2}) site in North Springfield, Pennsylvania was picked to serve as a new permanent site for the camp. The wood land, located on Lake Erie, was located 72 miles (116 km) from Youngstown. Heirs of John H. Fitch contributed $25,000 for the purchase of the site. In 1924, the tenth anniversary of Camp Fitch, camp was moved to its present site. The new site consisted of many acres of woodland and a half-mile (800 m) of beachfront.

On the present day site, the camp emphasis was on program and the camp was staffed with a doctor, chaplain, directors for crafts, nature study, riflery, waterfront, village directors for each of the three villages (Windy City for boys ages 9 to 11, Chicagami for boys ages 12 to 14, Ot-Yo-Kwa for boys age 15 and older), an assistant camp director for program, a camp steward to handle the dining room and camp store and a tent leader for each tent.

Group tent picture taken in 1969. Military tents like the one shown above housed all campers until 1986 when the cabent was introduced. Military tents were gradually phased out of use as more cabents were built each summer season.

Camp Fitch operated exclusively as a boys' camp until the summer of 1951, when a two-week program for girls was initiated. This received an enthusiastic response, and the following years additional periods just for girls were added. By 1957, attendance for boys and girls increased to the point that the camp finally saw the necessity of simultaneously operating both a girls' camp and a boys' camp. The girls' camp (Chicagami) occupied the original site of the boys' camp. An area of forest was cleared to the east of Chicagami for the establishment of the new boys' camp, Ot-Yo-Kwa.

In the mid-1960s, Camp Fitch was formally recognized as a YMCA branch and began a period of major expansion in facilities and programming over the course of several decades. Under the direction of William Lyder, Fitch was able to grow from a seasonal operation to a permanent, year-round establishment running approximately 340 days a year. Existing buildings on campus were winterized and modified to accommodate year-round programming. The upgrades to these buildings along with the construction of two outdoor education lodges allowed for the creation of an Outdoor Education program in 1973 that serves schools and youth groups when summer camp is not in session. During the Outdoor education season, the Fitch's outdoor education staff work with visiting school faculty to facilitate a curriculum covering the historical, geographical and biological interests of the area. With the addition of the year-round programming, about 19,000 campers attend the camp a year.

With the expansion of program offerings, Fitch found itself in need of additional land to accommodate its growing population. In the early 1970s, the camp purchased 284 acres (1.1 km^{2}) of wooded flatland and a half-mile of shore line on Lake Erie. In addition, the eastern boundary was expanded to run along Crooked Creek. In 1984, the French Creek Boy Scout Council in Erie sold its Camp Sequoyah, located just east of Camp Fitch. Fitch purchased all of Sequoyah south of Ables Road, along with 300 feet (91 m) of lake front property. This expansion brought the camp to its current size of over 450 acres (1.8 km^{2}) with 1 mile (1.6 km) of frontage on Lake Erie. To date, only about 90 acres (360,000 m^{2}) of camp land has been developed. The remaining lands have been left as undisturbed wilderness, which is used for outdoor camp programs, hiking trails and extended overnight camping as well as a buffer to external expansions in the area.

In addition to expanding Fitch's land holdings, Lyder campaigned to increase the number of facilities available to campers. A pool and inland lake were built to expand the aquatics program. All bath facilities were upgraded under his watch and several residential lodges constructed. Programming areas received roofs to shields campers from snow and rain, and a 40-foot climbing tower was constructed. The most significant facility impacts during his tenure, however, were the creation of cabents and the construction of a new Dining Hall. With the new dining hall in place, the camp's dining capacity was expanded to accommodate 1000 guests at a time. With these new accommodations in place, Fitch has recently started to host corporate retreats and conferences throughout the year.

== Camp Fitch today ==
=== Cabents (1986 to Present) ===
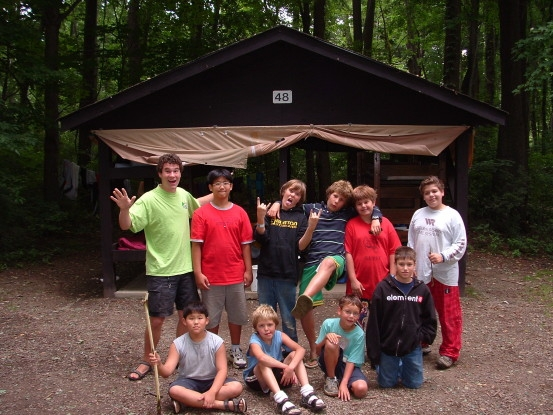
A Camp Fitch cabent (Summer 2003)

Camp Fitch had long held on to the tradition of housing campers in tents; however, by 1986, the cost of repairing canvas and the inconveniences of conventional military tents brought on the need for alternative accommodations. Thus, the cabent (a tent/cabin hybrid) was born. A cabent has a permanent wooden roof with 8 in × 8 in (200 mm × 200 mm) corner pillars and canvas sides erected over a cement platform. Cabents allowed the camp to maintain its tradition of outdoor, tent-style camping while eliminating challenges that come with such accommodations. Each cabent unit generally accommodates eight occupants - typically one counselor and seven campers. In the early 2000s, most cabents in the camp were upgraded with built-in bunk beds eliminating the need for work crews to move and store bunks in the off seasons. Cabents housed the camp's population during the summer season from 1986 to 2017. Currently, they are used for housing campers 14 and older.

=== Cabins (2017 to Present) ===
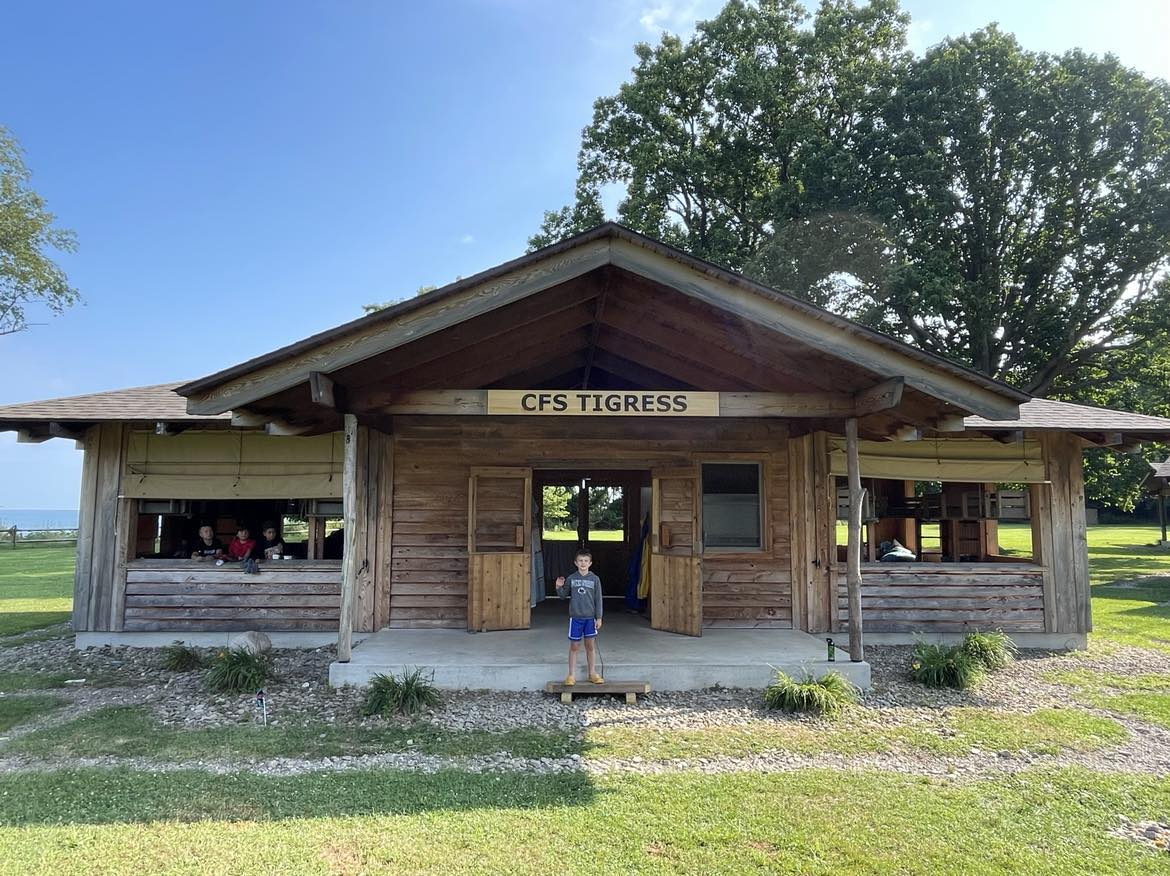
A Camp Fitch Cabin, Front View, overlooking Lake Erie (summer 2023)

In 2017, the camp decided to upgrade its permanent housing from the cabent to a larger cabin structure of its own unique design. Wanting to retain the camp’s tradition of “open air meets enclosed structure”, the new design retains the openness of the previous cabent while incorporating features found in traditional cabins at other camps. Cabins sit on a 44-foot by 35-foot foundation with a post and beam construction built from century old reclaimed douglas fir. The cabins comprise two separate wings to house campers and staff. The sleeping areas nearly double the capacity of the cabents and improve supervision as multiple staff are housed with the campers. To maintain the openair feel of a cabent, a large portion of each exterior wall has been left open to allow for a flowing cross breeze from Lake Erie. In the event of inclement weather, all-weather siding can be rolled down over the open areas in a similar style to the cabents. As of 2024, Camp Fitch has built 16 cabins to house all campers under age 13. Its current plans are to eventually build at least 26 in total.

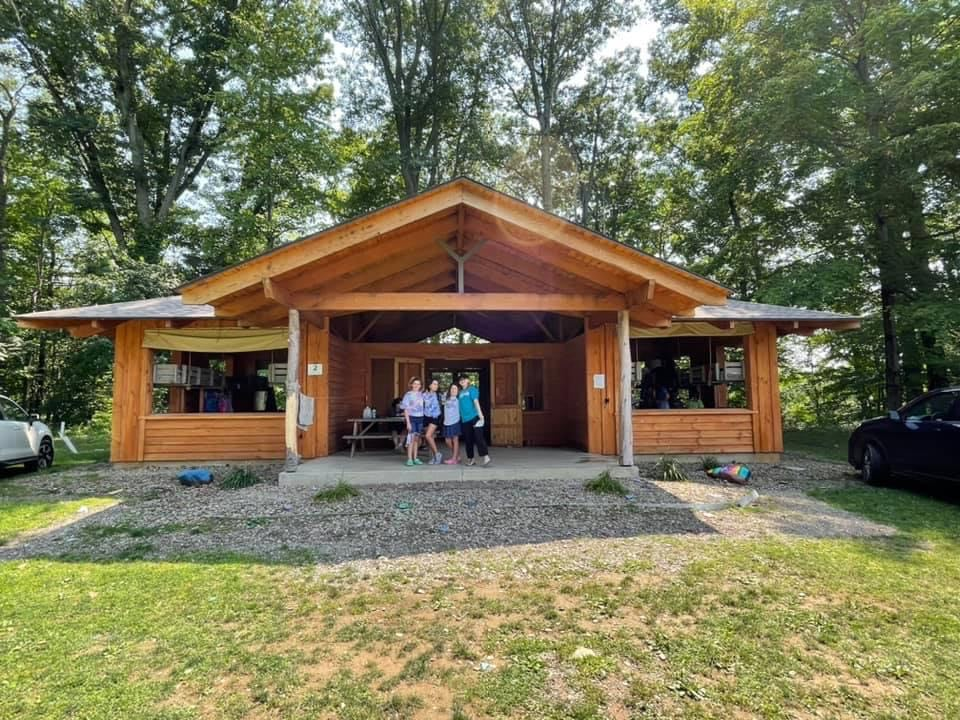
Modern Camp Fitch Cabin (Rear View)

In addition to improving the camper/staff ratio, the cabins deliver more modern amenities cabents and tents were unable to provide. A common area sitting between the housing wings provides a half bath and private changing areas. Two covered, open-air porches are located in the front and rear of the cabins and the permanent walls along the foundations keep the cabins insides dry during wet spells.

=== International programs ===
For several decades members of the international have had a continual presence among the staff and volunteers of Camp Fitch. This tradition can trace its roots back to 1972 when the international camp counselor program of the YMCA arranged for a registered nurse from Switzerland to join the staff. For the next decade, the camp hosted a few international staff each year; however, in 1984 Camp Fitch was able to begin to expand the number of staff coming from abroad. This was primarily due to a close link that had been established between the YMCA España and several YMCAs of Northern Ohio. This partnership at first resulted in a small staff exchange program between the two countries. By 1987 Camp Fitch's counselor in training program was expanded to actively recruit both Spanish and American youths for staff development. Today Camp Fitch still works extensively with YMCA España as well as the YMCA ICCP Program and other international partners to coordinate international camping experiences for foreign children and young adults. Every year, Fitch hosts several international staff members, campers and CITs.

=== Facilities and activities ===
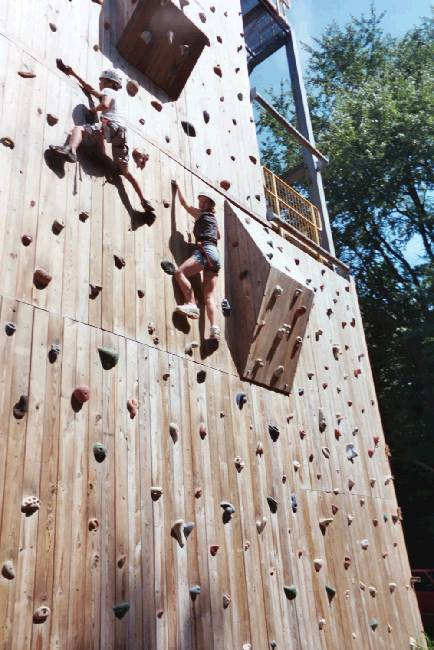
Fitch's 40-foot (12 m) Climbing Tower

Camp Fitch's facilities include a 4-story climbing tower with zip line, an indoor climbing center, rifle range, archery range, swimming pool, mountain bike trails, horseback riding, air-rifle range, an indoor nature activity center, an inland Lake (Lake MVIMA) and access to Lake Erie. Activity areas include: Horseback Riding, Air-Rifles, Rock Climbing, Swimming, Sailing, Crafts, Canoeing, Boating, Water-skiing, Archery, Riflery (22 mm), Rocketry, Horsemanship Lessons, Campfires, Swim Lessons, SUP and daily age-group specific programs.

=== Fleets ===
During the summer sessions, campers are divided into different age groups, "fleets". Fleet's Cabents are grouped together on the camp grounds, and their tables are grouped together in the dining hall. Each fleet has its own set of songs and traditions, and throughout the week campers get the opportunity to participate in fleet-only programs geared towards the camper's age level. In Girls' Camp, ages groups are divided as follows: Sloop fleet (ages 8 to 10), Schooner fleet (ages 11 to 12), and Clipper fleet (ages 13 to 14), Galleon Fleet (ages 15 to 16). Boys' Camp is divided as follows: Sloop Fleet (ages 8 to 10), Schooner Fleet (ages 11 to 12), Clipper Fleet (ages 13 to 14), Galleon Fleet (ages 15 to 16). Both Girls' Camp and Boys' Camp have a Mackinaw Fleet (ages 6 to 7) - a special "first" camp designed to introduce young children to summer camping.

=== Specialty camps ===
In addition to the traditional summer camp program offered each season, Camp Fitch also offers several "specialty" camps. These programs generally emphasize a theme or goal for its attendees and most are designed to permit participants the chance to take part in the traditional camp programs during their stay. Specialty camps are generally divided into three separate categories:

Leadership and Development Fleets Camp Fitch offers two programs aimed at developing leadership ability for future staff. Its Counselor in Training program for rising High School juniors in particular is well known in the region for training members of the international community and finding them placement both at Camp Fitch and several other summer camps in northwestern Pennsylvania. The Leaders in Training program is available for rising sophomores to learn the basics of leadership at Camp Fitch while all of the training can be applied to home life.

Focus Programs Focus Programs include all events from traditional camp along with additional programs and offerings by leaders in the specialty. At the Camp Fitch Farm, campers can choose Farm Focus featuring our several heritage breeds of domesticated animals, while Outriders features our Equestrian Programs. Tech Focus at Camp Fitch includes Drone Camp and one of the oldest computer camps in the nation. In addition to these activity camps, camp also hosts a Diabetes program and Camp Frog for epilepsy during the summer. From the 1970s until 2017, camp had offered a residency camp for adults with mental and physical disabilities.

Teen Adventure Trips Every summer Camp Fitch offers several multi-week off-site camping trips. Typically, these trips include hiking, white water rafting, caving and rock climbing across the eastern United States.

== Spiritual mission ==
Curly's Chapel 1964, named for Camp Fitch's director in the late twenties and thirties. Raymond "Curly" Johnson was the writer of Camp Fitch's Candlelight Service. The service is still held weekly in the camp chapel during the summer session.

The inspiration for the founding of Camp Fitch, according to the camp's 25th anniversary publication, sprang from the "need of the city boy for a vacation in the out-of-doors under Christian leadership". Today, Fitch's mission reflects the traditional goal of the YMCA: "helping children grow in spirit, mind and body". While campers and staff of many creeds regularly attend camp year round, Christian education and leadership are still built into the core of the camp's mission. Camp staff are expected to "lead by example" by acting in a Christian manner at all times. To encourage this, it provides a Christian Leadership Conference once a year for YCA staff and volunteers. Camp Fitch has set aside several locations on its grounds to help facilitate the spiritual portion of its mission including two outdoor chapels, one indoor chapel, and reflection points for both the Girls' and Boys' camps.

During the summer session, campers attend daily chapel services and a midweek colloquial Vespers service; however, most alumni of Camp Fitch would agree that the spiritual highlight of summer camping period is the unique Candlelight service held at the close of each week. Authored by Raymond L. "Curly" Johnson, Fitch's director from 1928 to 1935, this service blends lessons of character building with Christian themes. Johnson originally conducted the service himself for campers, and the version used today has changed very little from its original form. At the end of the service, attendee's are tasked with setting a personal goal to work towards during his or her time away from Camp Fitch. In 1982 to honor Johnson and his impact on Fitch's spiritual heritage, the camp chapel was renovated and renamed "Curly's Chapel".

== Affiliations ==
Camp Fitch is a member of the American Camp Association.
