= Three Rivers Academy (disambiguation) =

Three Rivers Academy may refer to:

- Three Rivers Academy, Trois-Rivières, Québec, Canada, a high school
- Three Rivers Academy, Surrey, England, a secondary school
- Three Rivers Academy Sixth Form College, Surrey, England, a junior college

== See also ==
- Three Rivers High School (disambiguation)
- Three Rivers College (disambiguation)
- Three Rivers (disambiguation)
