= Three Rivers =

Three Rivers may refer to:

== Related to Pittsburgh, Pennsylvania, United States ==
- The confluence of the Allegheny River and Monongahela River to form the Ohio River at Pittsburgh, Pennsylvania
  - A nickname for the Pittsburgh area and a phrase used commonly in local culture
  - Three Rivers Park in Pittsburgh
  - Three Rivers Heritage Trail in Pittsburgh and Allegheny County
  - Three Rivers Arts Festival, held in Pittsburgh
  - Pittsburgh Three Rivers Regatta
  - Three Rivers Classic, an ice hockey tournament
  - Three Rivers Stadium, a now demolished sports facility in Pittsburgh
  - Three Rivers Xplosion, a women's football team in Pittsburgh
  - Three Rivers Review, a literary magazine published by the University of Pittsburgh
  - Three Rivers Village School in Pittsburgh

== Geography ==
=== Australia ===
- Three Rivers Station, a pastoral lease in the Mid West of Western Australia
- Three Rivers, Queensland, a locality in the Shire of Cloncurry

=== Canada ===
- Trois-Rivières, a city formerly called Three Rivers
- Trois-Rivières (federal electoral district), a federal electoral district in Quebec, formerly called Three Rivers
- Three Rivers, Prince Edward Island, an amalgamated town in eastern PEI
- The Three Rivers (Prince Edward Island), the collective name for the Brudenell, Cardigan and Montague Rivers
- Three Rivers, New Brunswick, a village
  - The historical collective name for the Petitcodiac River, the Memramcook River, and the Shepody Bay in New Brunswick

=== United Kingdom ===
- Three Rivers District, Hertfordshire
- Three Rivers Estuary, Carmarthen Bay

=== United States ===
- Three Rivers, California
- Three Rivers, Massachusetts
- Three Rivers, Michigan
- Three Rivers, New Mexico
- Three Rivers Park District, Minnesota
- Three Rivers, the region surrounding Muskogee, Oklahoma
  - Three Rivers Museum, a museum in Muskogee, Oklahoma
- Three Rivers (Oregon), a river
- Three Rivers, Oregon, a census-designated place
- Three Rivers, Texas
- Three Rivers Petroglyph Site, a state park in New Mexico

=== Elsewhere ===
- Sanjiangyuan National Nature Reserve or Three Rivers Nature Reserve, Qinghai province, China, containing the headwaters of the Yellow, Yangtze, and Mekong Rivers
- Kiso Three Rivers, Japan, a river confluence
- Three Rivers Proper, a suburb of Vereeniging, Gauteng, South Africa
- Three Rivers East, a suburb of Vereeniging, Gauteng, South Africa

== Businesses ==
- Three Rivers Casino and Resort, Oregon
- Three Rivers Computer Corporation, a defunct corporation
- Three Rivers Mall, Kelso, Washington
- Three Rivers Press, a book publisher

== Education ==
- Three Rivers Community College (Connecticut), Norwich, Connecticut, United States
- Three Rivers Community College (Missouri), Poplar Bluff, Missouri, United States
- Three Rivers Academy Sixth Form College, Surrey, England, a junior college
- Three Rivers Academy, Trois-Rivières, Québec, Canada, a high school
- Three Rivers Academy, Surrey, England, a secondary school
- Three Rivers Academy Sixth Form College, Surrey, England, a junior college
- Three Rivers School District (disambiguation)
  - Three Rivers Community Schools, a school district in Michigan, United States
- Three Rivers High School (disambiguation)
- Three Rivers Village School, Pittsburgh, Pennsylvania, United States

== Other uses ==
- Federal Correctional Institution, Three Rivers
- Three Rivers Conference (disambiguation), athletics and activities conference in multiple states
- Three Rivers District (VHSL), Virginia, United States, a school sports conference
- Three Rivers DC v Governor of the Bank of England, a 2001 UK legal case concerning the collapse of the Bank of Credit and Commerce International
- The Three Rivers Regiment (12e Régiment blindé du Canada), a Canadian military unit
- Three Rivers Festival, Fort Wayne, Indiana, United States
- Three Rivers Fountain, Adelaide, South Australia
- Three Rivers Rambler, a tourist train in Knoxville, Tennessee
- Three Rivers (train), a discontinued Amtrak train
- Three Rivers (TV series), an American medical drama, debuted and cancelled in 2009
- Three Rivers, the working title for the 1993 film Striking Distance
- Three Rivers, a fictional suburb in the 1994 show My So-Called Life
- "Three Rivers", a song by Dave on his 2021 album We're All Alone in This Together
- Three Rivers Fire, a 2021 fire in New Mexico

== See also ==
- Three Rivers and St. Maurice, former electoral district in Canada
- Three Rivers East, a suburb of Vereeniging, Gauteng, South Africa
- Three Rivers Proper, a suburb of Vereeniging, Gauteng
- Three Parallel Rivers of Yunnan Protected Areas, Yunan Province, China, within the drainage basins of the Yangtze, Mekong, and Salween Rivers
- Trois-Rivières (disambiguation)
- Tres Rios (disambiguation)
- 三河
