= TRCC =

TRCC can refer to:

- Three Rivers Community College
- Texas Residential Construction Commission
- Toronto Rape Crisis Centre
