= Three Rivers High School =

Three Rivers High School can be:

- Three Rivers Academy, formerly Three Rivers High School, Trois-Rivières, Quebec, Canada
- Three Rivers High School (Michigan), Three Rivers, Michigan, United States
- Three Rivers High School (Texas), Three Rivers, Texas, United States

== Other uses ==
- Three Rivers Academy, Surrey, England, UK; a high school

== See also ==
- Three Rivers (disambiguation)
