= 三河 =

三河, meaning "Three_Rivers", may refer to:

== Japan ==
- Mikawa Province (三河国), a former partition of Japan
- Mikawa-Anjō Station (三河安城駅)

== Mainland China ==
- Sanhe, Hebei (三河市), county-level city in Langfang, Hebei
- Sanhe Subdistrict, Chengdu (三河街道), in Xindu District, Chengdu, Sichuan
- Towns named Sanhe (三河镇)
  - Sanhe, Feixi County, Anhui
  - Sanhe, Haiyuan County, Ningxia
  - Sanhe, Yilong County, Sichuan
- Sanhe Township (三河乡)
  - Sanhe Hui Ethnic Township (三河回族乡), Ergun City, Inner Mongolia

== See also ==
- Sanhe (disambiguation), for topics that are romanised as "Sanhe" but not written in Chinese as "三河".
