= Vicksburg High School =

Vicksburg High School may refer to:

- Vicksburg High School (Michigan)
- Vicksburg High School (Mississippi)
