= Three Rivers School District =

Three Rivers School District may refer to:

- Three Rivers Community Schools, a school district in Michigan, USA
- Three Rivers Independent School District, a school district in Texas, USA
- Three Rivers School District (Oregon), USA; a school district

== Other uses ==
- Three Rivers Conference (disambiguation), school sports districts
  - Three Rivers District (VHSL), Virginia, USA; a school sports district

== See also ==
- Three Rivers (disambiguation)
