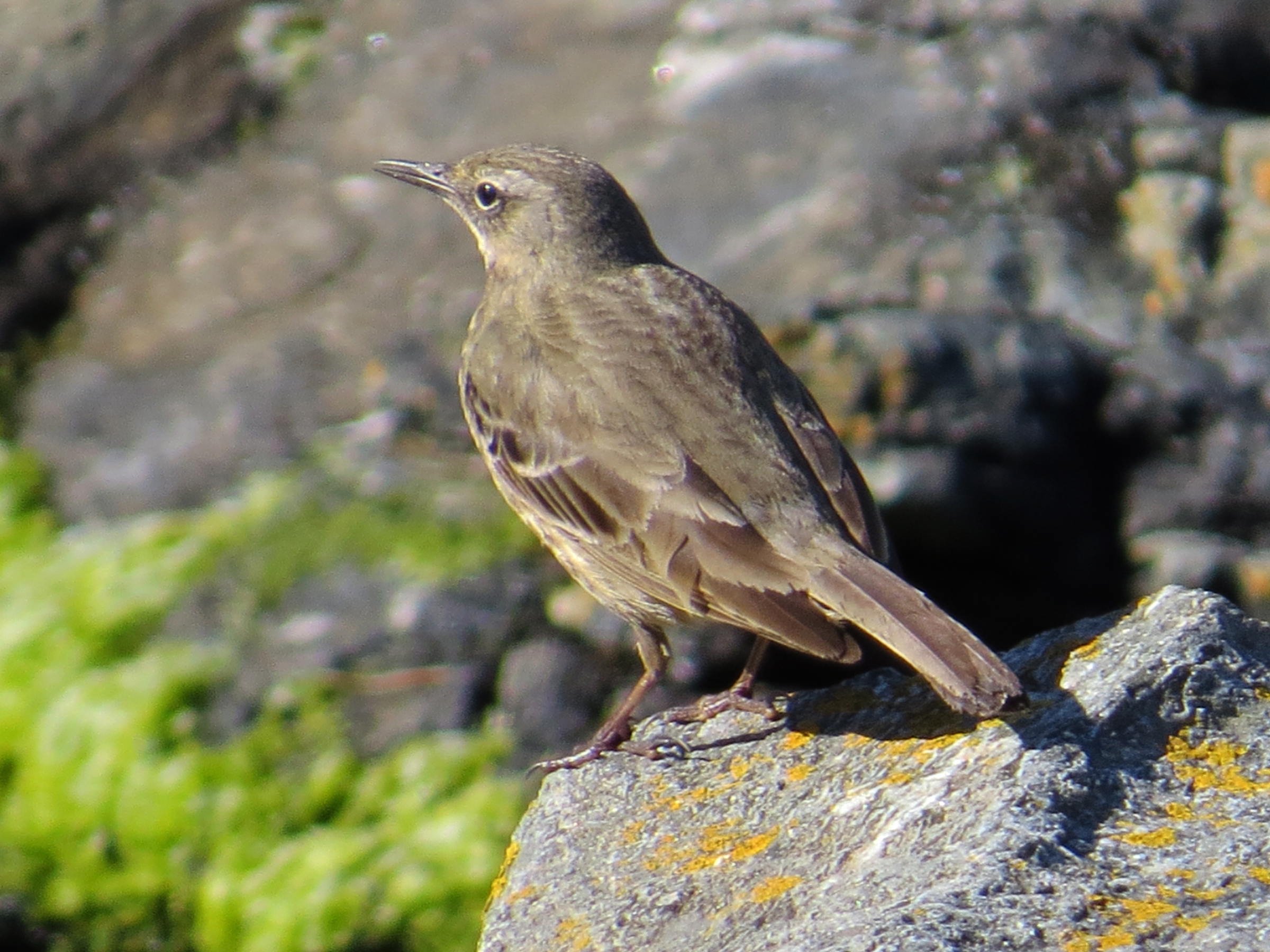
- Nominate A. p. petrosus at Portsoy in Aberdeenshire, Scotland
- Bird recorded in Pembrokeshire, Wales

Conservation status
- Least Concern (IUCN 3.1)

Scientific classification
- Kingdom: Animalia
- Phylum: Chordata
- Class: Aves
- Order: Passeriformes
- Family: Motacillidae
- Genus: Anthus
- Species: A. petrosus

Binomial name
- Anthus petrosus (Montagu, 1798)
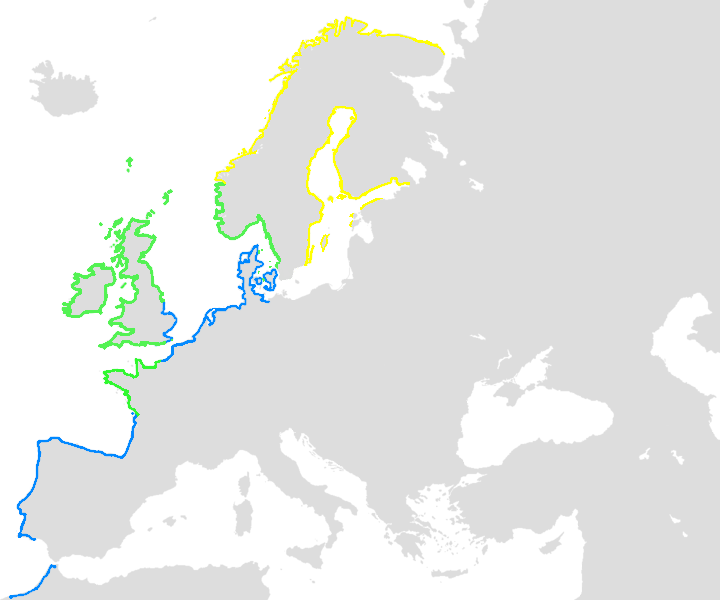
- Breeding summer visitor; Resident year-round; Winter visitor (ranges are approximate)

Synonyms
- Anthus spinoletta petrosus (Montagu, 1798)

= European rock pipit =

Small passerine bird that breeds in western Europe

The European rock pipit (Anthus petrosus), or simply rock pipit, is a species of small passerine bird that breeds in western Europe on rocky coasts. It has streaked greyish-brown upperparts and buff underparts, and is similar in appearance to other European pipits. There are two subspecies, of which the nominate is non-migratory, and the Fennoscandian one is migratory, wintering in shoreline habitats further west and south in Europe. The European rock pipit is territorial at least in the breeding season, and year-round where it is resident. Males will sometimes enter an adjacent territory to assist the resident in repelling an intruder, behaviour only otherwise known from the African fiddler crab.

European rock pipits construct a cup nest under coastal vegetation or in cliff crevices and lay four to six speckled pale grey eggs which hatch in about two weeks with a further 16 days to fledging. Although insects are occasionally caught in flight, the pipits feed mainly on small invertebrates picked off the rocks or from shallow water.

The European rock pipit may be hunted by birds of prey, infested by parasites such as fleas, or act as an involuntary host to the common cuckoo, but overall its population is large and stable, and it is therefore evaluated as a species of least concern by the International Union for Conservation of Nature (IUCN).

== Taxonomy and systematics ==
The family Motacillidae consists of the wagtails, pipits and longclaws. The largest of these groups is the pipits in the genus Anthus, which are typically brown-plumaged terrestrial insectivores. Their similar appearances have led to taxonomic problems; the European rock pipit and the buff-bellied pipit were considered subspecies of the water pipit until they were separated by the British Ornithologists' Union in 1998. The European rock pipit is closely related to the meadow, red-throated and rosy pipits as well as its former subspecies.

The first formal description naming this species was by English naturalist George Montagu in 1798. It had previously been described in 1766 by Thomas Pennant, in the first edition of British Zoology, although he did not distinguish it from the common titlark (meadow pipit). It was first shown to be different from that species by John Walcott in the 1789 edition of his Synopsis of British Birds, in which he called it the sea lark. John Latham was the first to give the European rock pipit a scientific name, Alauda obscura in 1790, but his name was an invalid homonym, the same name being used a year earlier by Gmelin for a different bird from Sardinia. In the same year, Montagu, whom Latham had consulted about the bird, found European rock pipits on the coast of South Wales, where it was known to some fishermen in the region as the "rock lark". He adopted that name for the species and gave it the scientific name Alauda petrosa.

The scientific name of the European rock pipit is from Latin. Anthus is the name given by Pliny the Elder to a small bird of grasslands, and the specific petrosus means "rocky", from petrus, "rock".

There are two recognised subspecies of the European rock pipit:

Image	Subspecies	Distribution
	Anthus petrosus petrosus (Montagu, 1798) – the nominate subspecies	breeds in the Faroe Islands, Ireland, Great Britain, northwest France and the Channel Islands; non-migratory
	Anthus petrosus littoralis Brehm, 1823	breeds in Norway, Denmark, the Baltic Sea coasts, and far northwestern Russia; migratory, wintering on the coasts of western Europe from Scotland south to northwest Africa.

The suggested subspecies A. p. kleinschmidti on the Faroe Islands, Shetland, and Orkney, A. p. meinertzhageni on South Uist, A. p. hesperianus on the Isle of Arran, and A. p. ponens in northwestern France cannot be reliably separated from the nominate subspecies and are now included in it. There is a geographical cline in appearance, with longer-billed, darker birds at the western end of the range, and shorter-billed, paler individuals in the east.

== Description ==
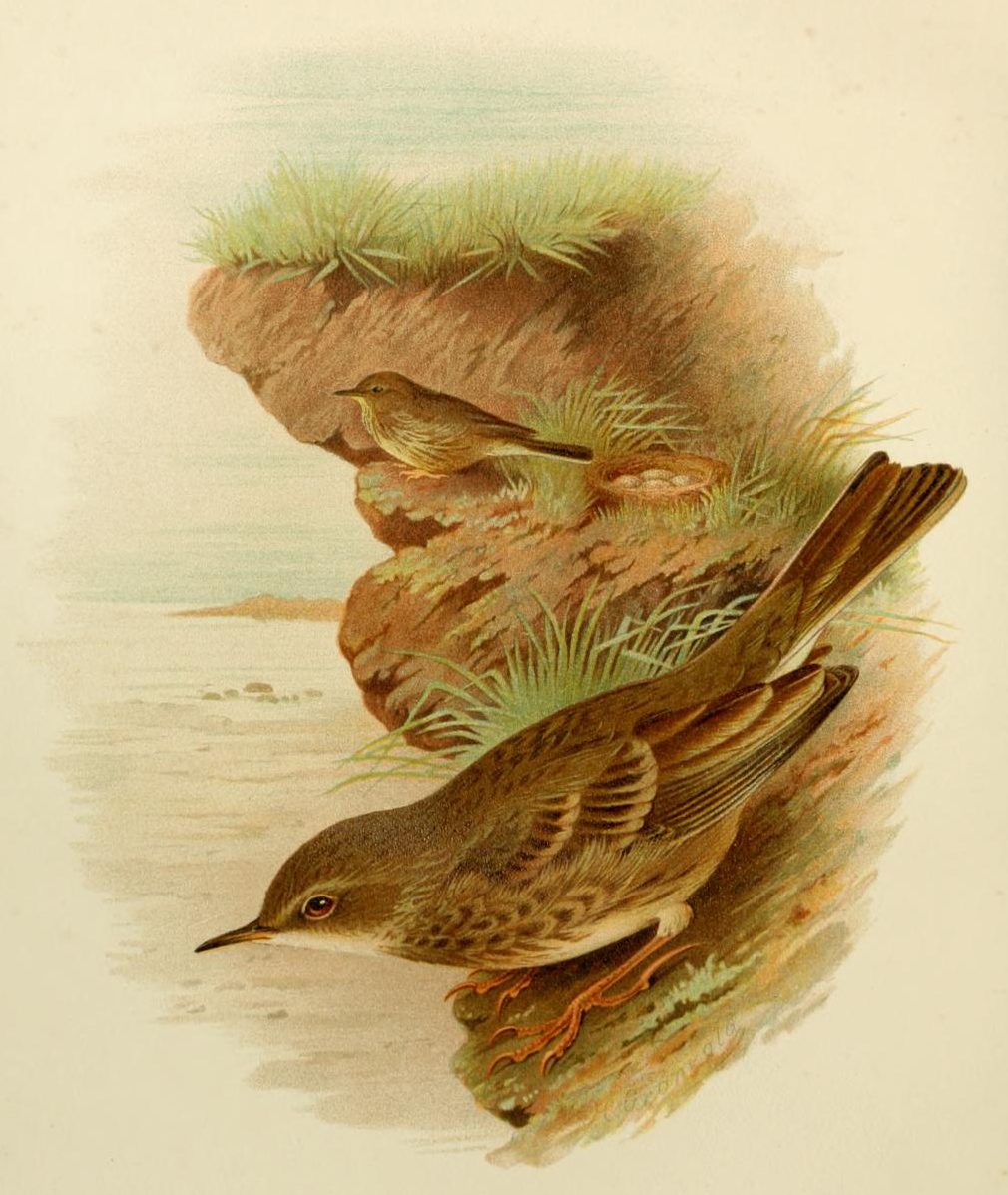
1907 illustration by Henrik Grønvold

The European rock pipit is 16.5–17 centimetres (6.5–6.7 in) long and weighs 18–32.5 grams (0.63–1.15 oz). The nominate race has smoky-olive upperparts, weakly streaked with darker brown, and buff underparts, heavily marked with poorly defined brown streaks. The legs, bill and iris are dark brown or blackish, and there is a pale eye-ring. The sexes are alike; although males average slightly brighter than females, the overlap is complete and birds cannot be sexed on appearance or measurements. Immature birds resemble the adult, although they may sometimes be browner and more streaked above, looking superficially similar to meadow pipits.

The eastern subspecies A. p. littoralis can only be reliably distinguished from the nominate subspecies in summer plumage, when it may show pinkish underparts and a pale supercilium (eyebrow), thereby resembling the water pipit. European rock pipits in winter are readily distinguishable from water pipits, but very difficult to assign to subspecies by appearance or measurements. The western populations are known to be nearly sedentary, so east of the Elbe basin vagrant Eurasian rock pipits are presumably mostly littoralis. Ringing results show that A. p. littoralis birds from Scandinavia winter widely within the breeding range of A. p. petrosus in Britain as well as further south in western Europe; they are sometimes, but not always, separated ecologically, tending to use more sheltered and muddier, less stony, coasts. Virtually all rock pipits in southeastern England (where A. p. petrosus does not breed) are A. p. littoralis.

Adult European rock pipits have a complete moult in August–September, at which time juveniles replace their body and some wing covert feathers, giving them an appearance very like the adults. From late January to early March there is a partial moult and individually variable moult of some body and wing covert feathers, and sometimes the central tail feathers.

The European rock pipit is closely related to the water pipit and the meadow pipit, and is rather similar in appearance. Compared to the meadow pipit, the European rock pipit is darker, larger and longer-winged than its relative, and has dark, rather than pinkish-red, legs. The water pipit in winter plumage is also confusable with the European rock pipit, but has a strong supercilium and greyer upperparts; it is also typically much warier. The European rock pipit's dusky, rather than white, outer tail feathers are also a distinction from all its relatives. The habitats used by European rock and water pipits are completely separate in the breeding season, and there is little overlap even when birds are not nesting.

The European rock pipit's song is a sequence of about twenty tinkling cheepa notes followed by a rising series of thin gee calls, and finishing with a short trill. The shrill pseep flight call is intermediate between the soft sip sip sip of the meadow pipit and the water pipit's short, thin fist.

== Distribution and habitat ==
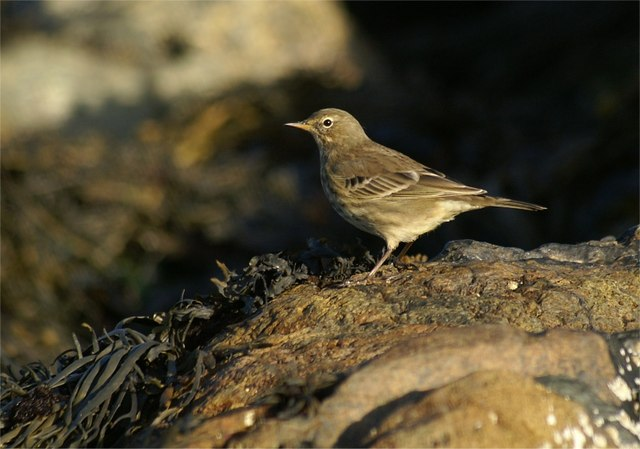
On the rocky beaches of Norwick, Shetland

The European rock pipit is almost entirely coastal, frequenting rocky areas typically below 100 metres (330 ft), although on St Kilda it breeds at up to 400 metres (1,300 ft). The European rock pipit is not troubled by wind or rain, although it avoids very exposed situations. It may occur further inland in winter or on migration.

The breeding range is temperate and Arctic Europe on western and Baltic Sea coasts, with a very small number sometimes nesting in Iceland. The nominate race is largely resident, with only limited movement. A. p. littoralis is largely migratory, wintering on coasts from southern Scandinavia to southwest Europe, with a few reaching Morocco. Wanderers have reached Spitsbergen and the Canary Islands, but records in Europe away from the coast are rare. For example, a male shot at Dresden in 1894, now in the collection of the local State Museum of Zoology, is the sole specimen for Saxony.

Migratory populations leave their breeding grounds in September and October, returning from March onwards, although in the far north they may not arrive before May.

== Behaviour ==
The European rock pipit is a much more approachable bird than the water pipit. If startled, it flies a fairly short distance, close to the ground, before it alights, whereas its relative is warier and flies some distance before landing again. Eurasian rock pipits are usually solitary, only occasionally forming small flocks.

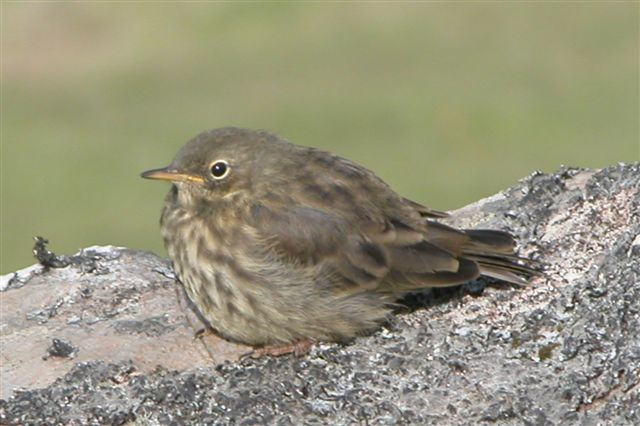
A. p. petrosus on Suðuroy, Faroe Islands

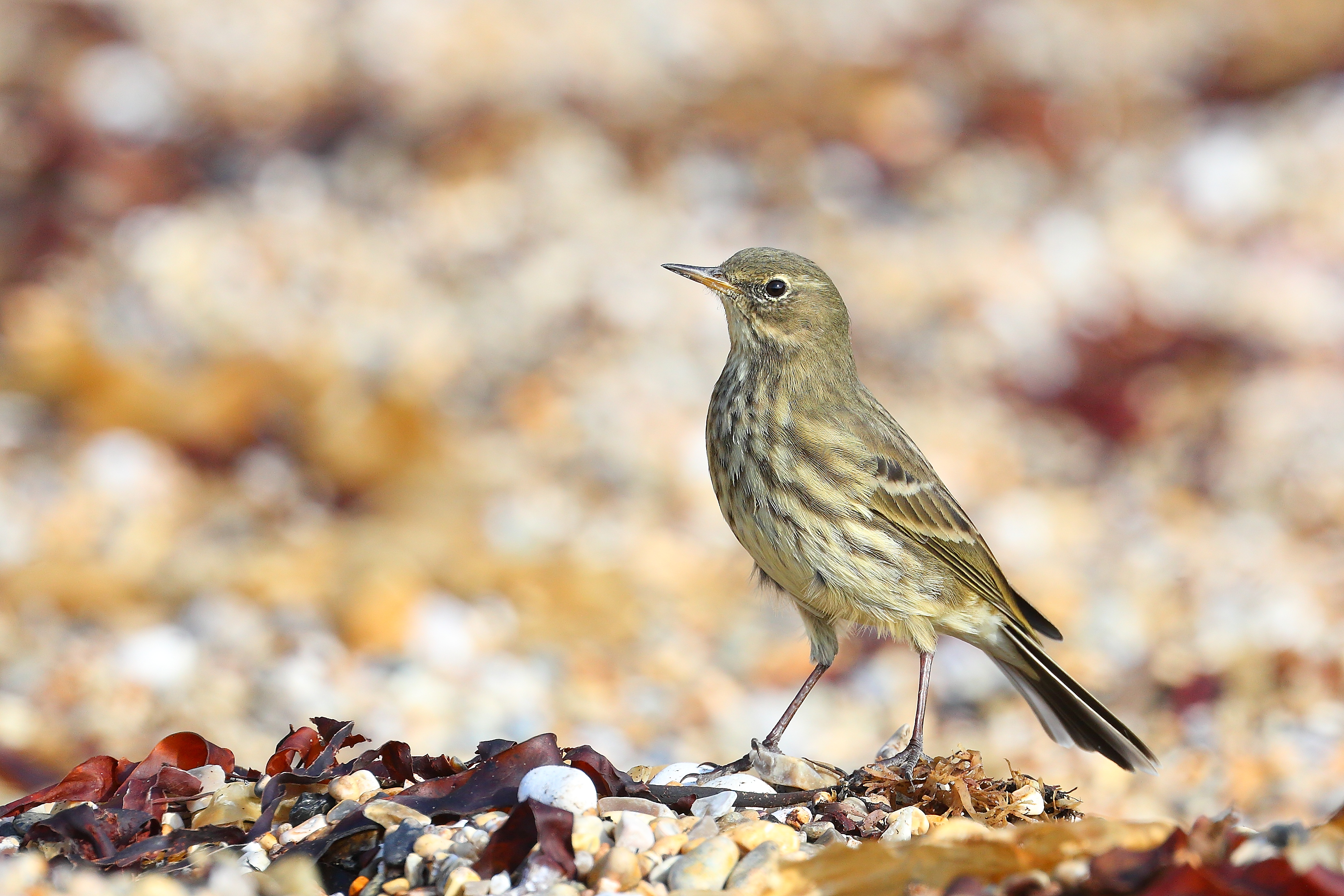
Anthus petrosus at Ringstead Bay, Dorset

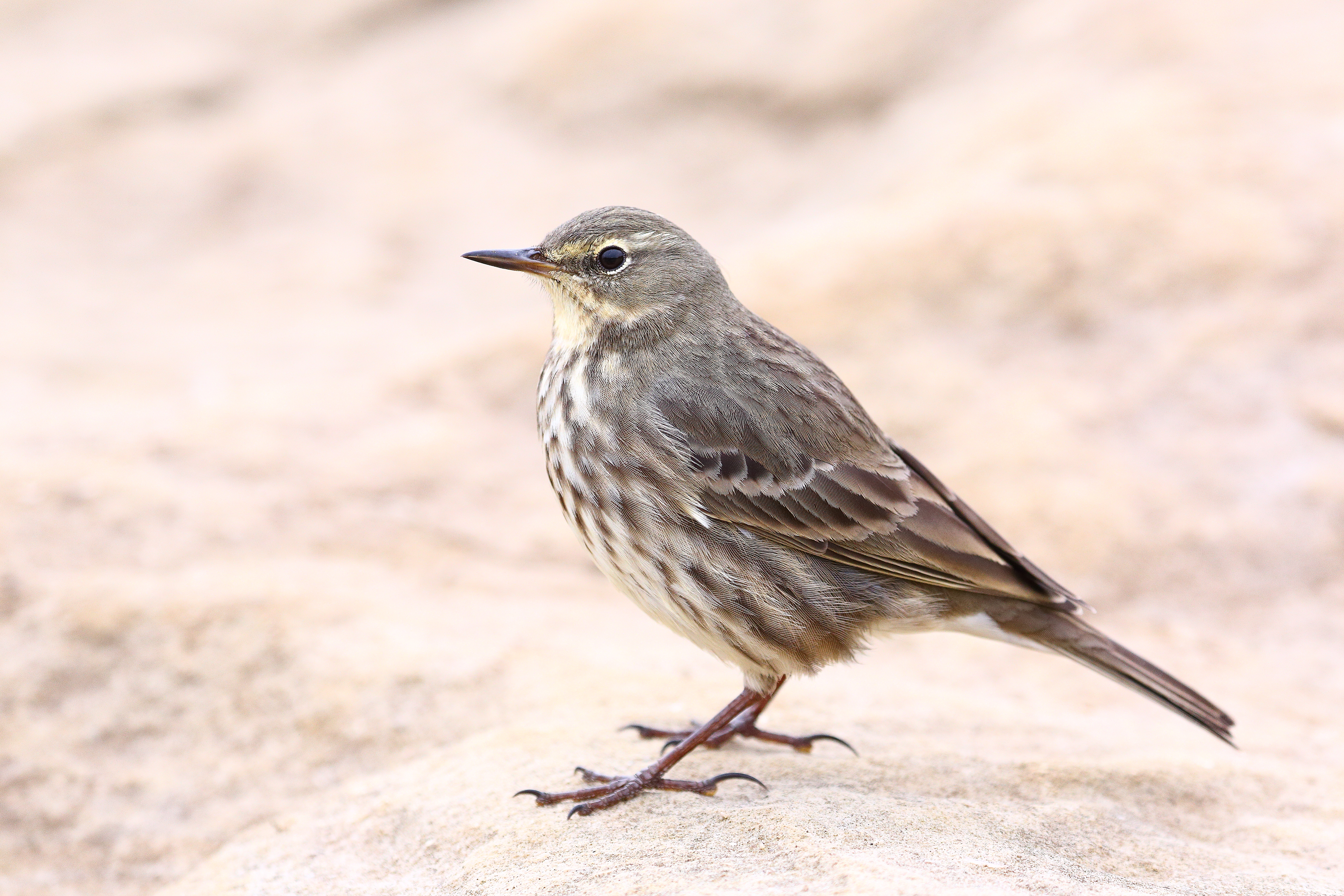
Anthus petrosus at Swanage, Wales

=== Breeding ===
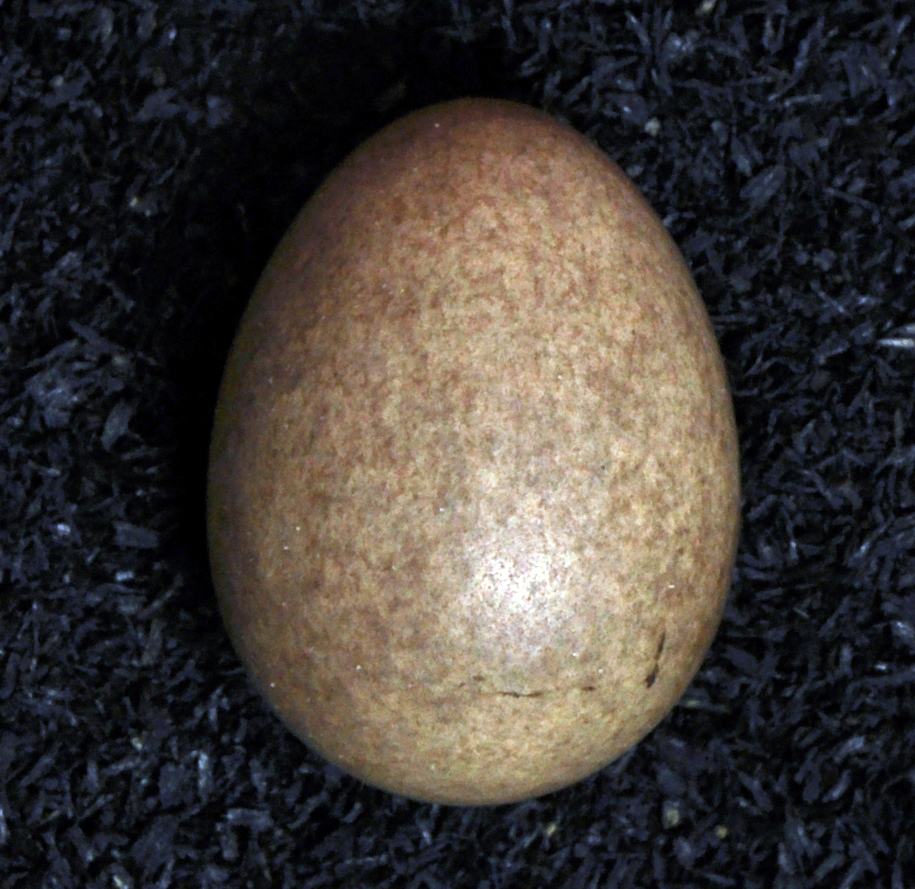
The bird lays four to six speckled pale grey eggs which hatch in about two weeks.

The European rock pipit is highly territorial in the breeding season, and throughout the year where it is resident. Breeding males have a song display in which they fly to 15–30 metres (49–98 ft) above the ground, then circle or descend to the ground with a fluttering "parachute" flight. Territorial males will sometimes enter the territory of an adjacent male to cooperate in evicting an intruder. This behaviour, which requires the ability to distinguish the resident from the intruder, is only otherwise known from the African fiddler crab.

Eggs are laid from early to mid-April in Britain and Ireland, from mid-May in southern Scandinavia, and from June in the north. The nest is always close to the shore, in a cliff crevice or hole, or under the cover of vegetation. It is constructed by the female from seaweed and dead grass, and lined with finer fibres or hair.

The clutch is four to six eggs, glossy pale grey with darker grey or olive speckles mainly at the wider end. They measure 21.6 by 16.0 millimetres (0.85 in × 0.63 in) and weigh 2.7 grams (0.095 oz), (Note: For A. p. petrosus and A. p. littoralis. The formerly sometimes accepted subspecies A. p. kleinschmidti is reported to have fractionally larger eggs at 22.2 by 16.1 millimetres (0.87 in × 0.63 in).) of which 5% is shell. They are incubated for 14–16 days to hatching, almost entirely by the female, although males have been recorded as occasionally helping. The naked altricial chicks are brooded by the female and fledge in about 16 days. Both parents may feed the chicks for several days after fledging. There may be two broods in a year in the south of the pipit's range, and just one further north.

In a British survey, a hatching rate of 82% and a fledging rate of 78% gave an overall 58% nesting success, with an average 2.5 surviving young per pair. In contrast, a study in northwestern France found juvenile mortality was nearly 70%. The average lifespan is not recorded, although the maximum recorded age is 10.9 years.

=== Feeding ===
The European rock pipit's feeding habitat is rocky coasts, rather than the damp grassland favoured by the water pipit. The European rock pipit feeds mainly on invertebrates, seeking out most of its prey on foot, only occasionally flying to catch insects. It will venture into shallow water as it follows retreating waves, and may take advantage of human activity that exposes sea slaters or other species that hide under stones.

Food items include snails, worms, small crustaceans, flies and beetles. The proportions of each prey species vary with season and locality. Amphipod larvae are important in Ireland and Scotland, crustaceans in Norway, and the mollusc Assiminea grayana in the Netherlands. Small fish are occasionally eaten, and in hard weather pipits may scavenge for other food, including human food litter. There is little competition from other species for food, since rocky beach specialists like the purple sandpiper take slightly larger food items, and may wade in deeper water. When food is abundant, meadow pipits may also feed on the shore, but are driven away by the European rock pipits when there is less prey available.

== Predators and parasites ==
The European rock pipit is hunted by birds of prey including the Eurasian sparrowhawk. As with other members of its genus, it is a host of the common cuckoo, a brood parasite. Eggs laid by cuckoos that specialise in using pipits as their hosts are similar in appearance to those of the pipit.

The European rock pipit is also a host to the flea Ceratophyllus borealis, and several other flea species in the genera Ceratophyllus and Dasypsyllus. The Eurasian rock pipit can benefit from parasitism of the common periwinkle Littorina littoria by the castrating trematode Parorchis acanthus. Beaches can become attractive where the decline of the periwinkle results in more ungrazed algae, with corresponding increases in invertebrates and a greater diversity of smaller Littorina snails as food for the pipits.

== Status ==
Estimates of the breeding population of the European rock pipit vary, but may be as high as 408,000 pairs, of which around 300,000 pairs are in Norway. Despite slight declines in the British population and some range expansion in Finland, the population is considered overall to be large and stable, and for this reason it is evaluated as a species of least concern by the IUCN.

Breeding densities vary from 0.9–6 pairs/km (1.4–9.7 pairs/mi) of coast depending on the quality of the habitat. There are few threats, although oil spills can temporarily reduce the invertebrate population of affected rocky coasts.
