= Vicksburg Community Schools =

School district in Michigan

Address
- 301 S. Kalamazoo Ave. Vicksburg, Kalamazoo, Michigan, 49097; United States

District information
- Grades: Pre-Kindergarten-12
- Superintendent: Keevin O'Neill
- Schools: 6
- Budget: $45,023,000 2022–2023 expenditures
- NCES District ID: 2634950

Students and staff
- Students: 2,560 (2024–2025)
- Teachers: 157.25 (on an FTE basis) (2024–2025)
- Staff: 321.35 FTE (2024–2025)
- Student–teacher ratio: 16.28 (2024–2025)

Other information
- Website: www.vicksburgschools.org

Vicksburg Community Schools is a public school district in Michigan. In Kalamazoo County, it serves Vicksburg and parts of the townships of Brady, Pavilion, Schoolcraft, and Wakeshma. It also serves parts of the townships of Mendon and Park in St. Joseph County.

== History ==
Vicksburg Community Schools was founded in 1846. By the late 19th century, each township within Vicksburg Community School's present boundaries had several small, independent school districts containing one-room schools, and Vicksburg High School was located in a building called Maple Street School. Consolidation of the rural districts with the Vicksburg district occurred in 1947. The first student graduated in 1881.

A new school, which contained all grades, opened in 1909. The school was expanded in 1915, and a sewing machine and a Victrola were purchased that year as well. The building is currently used as the district administration building.

The current high school was built in 1952 and expanded in 1954 and 1965. The auditorium opened in February 1994. Additions were built at the school in 2001.

Vicksburg Middle School, originally Vicksburg Junior High, opened in fall 1960. The architect was Trend Associates.

== Schools ==
Schools in Vicksburg Community Schools district
School	Address	Notes
Vicksburg High School	501 E. Highway St., Vicksburg	Grades 9–12. Built 1952.
Vicksburg Middle School	348 East Prairie St., Vicksburg	Grades 6–8. Built 1960.
Pathways High School	301 S. Kalamazoo St., Vicksburg	Alternative high school. Grades 9–12
Indian Lake Elementary	11901 South 30th St., Vicksburg	Grades PreK-5. Built 1963.
Sunset Lake Elementary	201 North Boulevard, Vicksburg	Grades PreK-5. Built 1958.
Tobey Elementary	8551 East Long Lake Dr., Scotts	Grades PreK-5. Built 1954.
