= Parorchis acanthus =

Scientific classification
- Kingdom: Animalia
- Phylum: Platyhelminthes
- Class: Trematoda
- Order: Plagiorchiida
- Family: Philophthalmidae
- Genus: Parorchis
- Species: P. acanthus

Binomial name
- Parorchis acanthus Nicoll, 1907

Species of fluke

Parorchis acanthus is a parasitic flatworm of the class Trematoda. It is a parasitic castrator of the common periwinkle Littorina littorea. Unlike many trematode species it encysts on hard surfaces and not inside a second intermediate host.

Free-living cercariae are released from the snail hosts to encyst on hard surfaces, generally the shells of bivalves. The release is encouraged by warmer temperatures and increased light intensity. Encystment on bivalves is most successful when they enter the mussel with the inhalation current first. They then actively emerge, using their suckers and then encyst on the shell. If the bivalve is then eaten by a bird P. acanthus will be transmitted to the definitive host. Survival and successful encystment can be reduced by the presence of epibionts, such as the barnacle Semibalanus balanoides, on the shell.

Castration of the snail molluscan host can result in a decline in host numbers and, in turn, can lead to more ungrazed algae, with corresponding increases in invertebrate populations and a greater diversity of smaller Littorina snails. The increased numbers of small prey items makes the affected rocky coasts more attractive to birds such as the purple sandpiper and European rock pipit. This is likely to facilitate transmission of P. acanthus to its definitive host.
