= Colin Bibby =

British ornithologist and conservationist

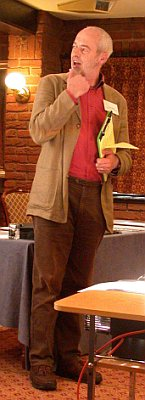
Bibby at the West Midland Bird Club's 'Bird Club Forum' at Lea Marston, Warwickshire, in February 2004

Colin Joseph Bibby (20 November 1948 – 7 August 2004) was a British ornithologist and conservationist.

Bibby was born in the Wirral, Cheshire, the son of a North Wales farmer. He was educated at Oundle School, Northamptonshire, and at St John's College, Cambridge, graduating in natural sciences. He gained his PhD for a classic study on the ecology and conservation of Dartford warblers.

Bibby was a research staff member for the Royal Society for the Protection of Birds from 1971 to 1986, and the head of Conservation Science from 1986 to 1991. In 1991, he moved to BirdLife International, where he led their research team and a major research program, with projects in over 70 countries. In 2001 he became a self-employed environmental consultant. He was also a member of the Rare Breeding Birds Panel, and the founding editor of the British Trust for Ornithology journal Ringing and Migration.

His major contributions were in the development of quantitative approaches to the study of birds for research leading to conservation. He was also a frequent contributor to British Birds magazine.

In 1994, he was awarded the Dr A.H. Heineken Prize for Environmental Sciences for his work with BirdLife International, and in June 2004, he received the RSPB Medal in recognition of his contribution to ornithology.

He learned that he had an incurable cancer in March 2004 and, on 7 August 2004 at the age of 55, died in his sleep. He was survived by his wife, Ruth, and three sons.

== Memorials ==
A special supplement published with Bird Conservation International (Vol 18 No 3, September 2008) was dedicated to Bibby. In it, Mike Rands, BirdLife's Chief Executive, wrote:

Colin Bibby was a truly remarkable man. He had a life-long interest in almost all things biological, and applied scientific thinking and rigour to a vast array of situations, be they the study of a particular conservation problem, or matters concerning the management of an organisation. [He] leaves a great legacy of knowledge and ideas, and this publication pays tribute to his innovative approach to the application of ornithology to conservation.

In 2017 a stained-glass painting of a Dartford Warbler, in the style of Bibby's favourite artist, Eric Ennion, was added to a window at St Michael and All Angels Church, Caldecote, Cambridgeshire in Bibby's honour. Bibby had spent the months after his fatal diagnosis fundraising for the church windows' restoration. A service of dedication for the memorial painting, on 16 July 2017, led by the Archdeacon of Cambridge, Alex Hughes, was attended by over 100 people.

== Selected publications ==
- Bibby, C. J.; Collar, N. J.; Heath, M. F.; Imboden, Ch.; Johnson, T. H.; Long, A. J.; Stattersfield, A. J.; Thirdgood, S. J. (1992). Putting biodiversity on the map: priority areas for global conservation. Girton College, Cambridge, U.K.: International Council for Bird Preservation. ISBN 0946888248. LCCN 98196426; vi+90 p. : col. ill.; 30 cm
- Bibby, Colin J.; Burgess, Neil D.; Hill, David A. (2 December 2012). Bird Census Techniques. Academic Press. ISBN 9780080984506; illustrated by Sandra Lambton, RSPB (pbk reprint of 1992 1st edition); Bibby, Colin J.; Burgess, Neil D.; Hillis, David M.; Hill, David A.; Mustoe, Simon (15 August 2000). 2nd edition. Elsevier. ISBN 0120958317. LCCN 00101511; Simon Mustoe was an additional co-author and co-illustrator for the 2nd edition.
