= Malcolm Ogilvie =

British ornithologist and author

Dr. Malcolm Alexander Ogilvie
- Occupations: Ornithologist; Natural history author
- Known for: Study of wildfowl

Dr. Malcolm Alexander Ogilvie is a British ornithologist and freelance natural history author and consultant. One of his areas of expertise is wildfowl.

Ogilvie was a research scientist with the Wildfowl and Wetlands Trust from 1960 to 1986, also editing their journal, Wildfowl, from 1966 to 1986. Until 1997 he was a member of the British Birds editorial board and a member of the editorial board of the handbook The Birds of the Western Palearctic. He has been a fully qualified bird ringer since 1958. He is a past regional representative for the British Trust for Ornithology, and past vice-county plant recorder for South Ebudes for the Botanical Society of Britain and Ireland.

Ogilvie has been resident on the island of Islay since 1986. He was married to Carol (died 2024) and has two daughters, Isla and Heather.

== Qualifications ==
- Member of the Society of Biology and a Chartered Biologist (MIBiol, CBiol) (1977)
- Doctor of Philosophy (PhD), Bristol University (1983)

== Positions ==
Ogilvie's positions have included:

- Member, Gloucestershire Ornithological Advisory Committee, 1963–1986
- Member, Ringing Committee, British Trust for Ornithology, 1970–1985
- Member, West Areas Board, Scottish Natural Heritage, February 1991 - March 2001 (Deputy Chairman, August 1997 - March 2001)
- Member, Scientific Advisory Committee, Scottish Natural Heritage, April 1994 - March 2001, and April 2005 - March 2010
- Chairman, Editorial Committee, Scottish Ornithologists' Club, 1997–2002
- Member, Committee for Scotland, Royal Society for the Protection of Birds, 1999–2004
- Regional Representative for Islay, Jura & Colonsay, British Trust for Ornithology, 1989–2006
- Member, Argyll Bird Records Panel, since 1990
- Organiser, Wetland Bird Survey (formerly National Wildfowl Counts), Argyll, 1991–2006
- Member, Argyll Raptor Study Group, since 1993
- Secretary, Rare Breeding Birds Panel, 1993–2006
- Rare Breeding Birds Panel representative on Scottish Raptor Monitoring Scheme, 2002–2006
- Recorder, vice-county 102 (S Ebudes), Botanical Society of the British Isles, 2004-2023

== Bibliography & references ==
=== Ornithology ===
- Ducks of Britain and Europe (illustrated by Carol Ogilvie), Poyser (1975) ISBN 0-85661-010-0
- The Winter Birds, Michael Joseph (1976) ISBN 0-7181-1529-5
- Wild Geese (illustrated by Carol Ogilvie), Poyser (1978) ISBN 0-931130-00-X
- The Bird-Watcher's Guide to the Wetlands of Britain, Batsford (1979) ISBN 0-7134-0847-2
- Birdwatching on Inland Fresh Waters (illustrated by Carol Ogilvie) Severn House (1981), ISBN 0-7278-2004-4;
  - paperback edition (1983)
- Wildfowl of Britain and Europe (illustrated by Peter Scott and Noel Cusa), Oxford University Press (1986) ISBN 0-19-217723-0
- Flamingos (illustrated by Carol Ogilvie), Alan Sutton (1986) ISBN 0-86299-266-4
- Best Days with British Birds (with Stuart Winter), British Birds Ltd. 1989 ISBN 0-9508471-3-5
- The Birds of Islay (illustrated by Carol Ogilvie), Lochindaal Press, 1992
  - second edition 1994
  - third edition 2003
- Wildfowl: Hamlyn Bird Behaviour Guide (illustrated by Bruce Pearson), Hamlyn, (1994) ISBN 0-600-57973-5
- Photographic Handbook: Wildfowl of the World (with Steve Young), New Holland (2002) ISBN 1-84330-328-0
- Grebes of the World (illustrated by Chris Rose), Bruce Coleman Books (2002) ISBN 1-872842-03-8
- Collect Birds on Stamps (5th edition, revised by Ogilvie), Stanley Gibbons, (2003) ISBN 0-85259-532-8
- Birds of Islay - A Celebration in Photographs (with Gordon Langsbury), Lochindaal Press (2006) ISBN 0-9551146-0-8

=== Other natural history ===
- The Wild Flowers of Islay : A Checklist, Lochindaal Press (1995)

=== Other ===
- Place Names of Islay: Their Meanings and Pronunciations compiled by Katie Ferguson and Margot Perrons, edited Ogilvie), Islay Museums Trust, (1990)
