= Trois-Rivières (disambiguation) =

Trois-Rivières means three rivers in French and may refer to:

in Canada

- Trois-Rivières, the largest city in the Mauricie region of Quebec, Canada
- Circuit Trois-Rivières, a racetrack in Trois-Rivières, Quebec
- Trois-Rivières (provincial electoral district), a provincial electoral district in Quebec
- Trois-Rivières (federal electoral district), a federal electoral district in Quebec
- Trois-Rivières (Province of Canada), a defunct electoral district in the Province of Canada (1841–1867)
- Trois-Rivières (Lower Canada), a defunct electoral district in Lower Canada (1792–1838)
- Trois-Rivières (territory equivalent to a regional county municipality), a statistical area
- Trois-Rivières, historically the collective name for the Petitcodiac River, the Memramcook River, and the Shepody Bay in New Brunswick.

in France

- Canton of Trois-Rivières, canton in the Arrondissement of Basse-Terre on the island of Guadeloupe.
- Trois-Rivières, Guadeloupe, a commune and chef-lieu of the Canton of Trois-Rivières
- Trois-Rivières, Martinique, a village on the island of Martinique
- Trois-Rivières, Somme, a commune in the Somme department

in Haiti

- Les Trois Rivières, a river in Haiti

== Other uses ==
- Trois-Rives, Quebec, Canada

== See also ==
- Three Rivers (disambiguation)
- Tres Rios (disambiguation)
