= Three Rivers High School (Michigan) =

Location
- 700 6th Avenue; Three Rivers, Michigan 49093-8328; United States; 41°56′51″N 85°37′02″W

Information
- School district: Three Rivers Community Schools
- Principal: Carrie Balk
- Teaching staff: 36.80 (FTE)
- Grades: 9-12
- Enrollment: 676 (2023–2024)
- Student to teacher ratio: 18.37
- Colors: Purple; White
- Team name: Wildcats
- Rival: Gull Lake High School; Vicksburg High School; Sturgis High School
- Website: www.trschools.org/schools/three-rivers-high-school/

Three Rivers High School is a high school in Three Rivers, Michigan, United States. It is operated by Three Rivers Community Schools.

== Demographics ==
The demographic breakdown of the 680 students enrolled in 2018-19 was:

- Male - 50.4%
- Female - 49.6%
- Native American - 0.3%
- Asian - 1.2%
- Black - 5.9%
- Hispanic - 6.8%
- Hawaiian/Pacific Islander - 0.3%
- White - 77.9%
- Multiracial - 7.6%

In addition, 46.9% of students were eligible for reduced-price or free lunch.

== Athletics ==
The school's teams are nicknamed the Wildcats. They compete in the Wolverine Conference. Three Rivers High School won Division 2 boys state Track & Field championships in 2000 and 2002. and in Football in 2003. Three Rivers' rivals are Sturgis High School, Gull Lake High School, Vicksburg High School.
