= Vicksburg, Michigan =

- Village
- City of Vicksburg
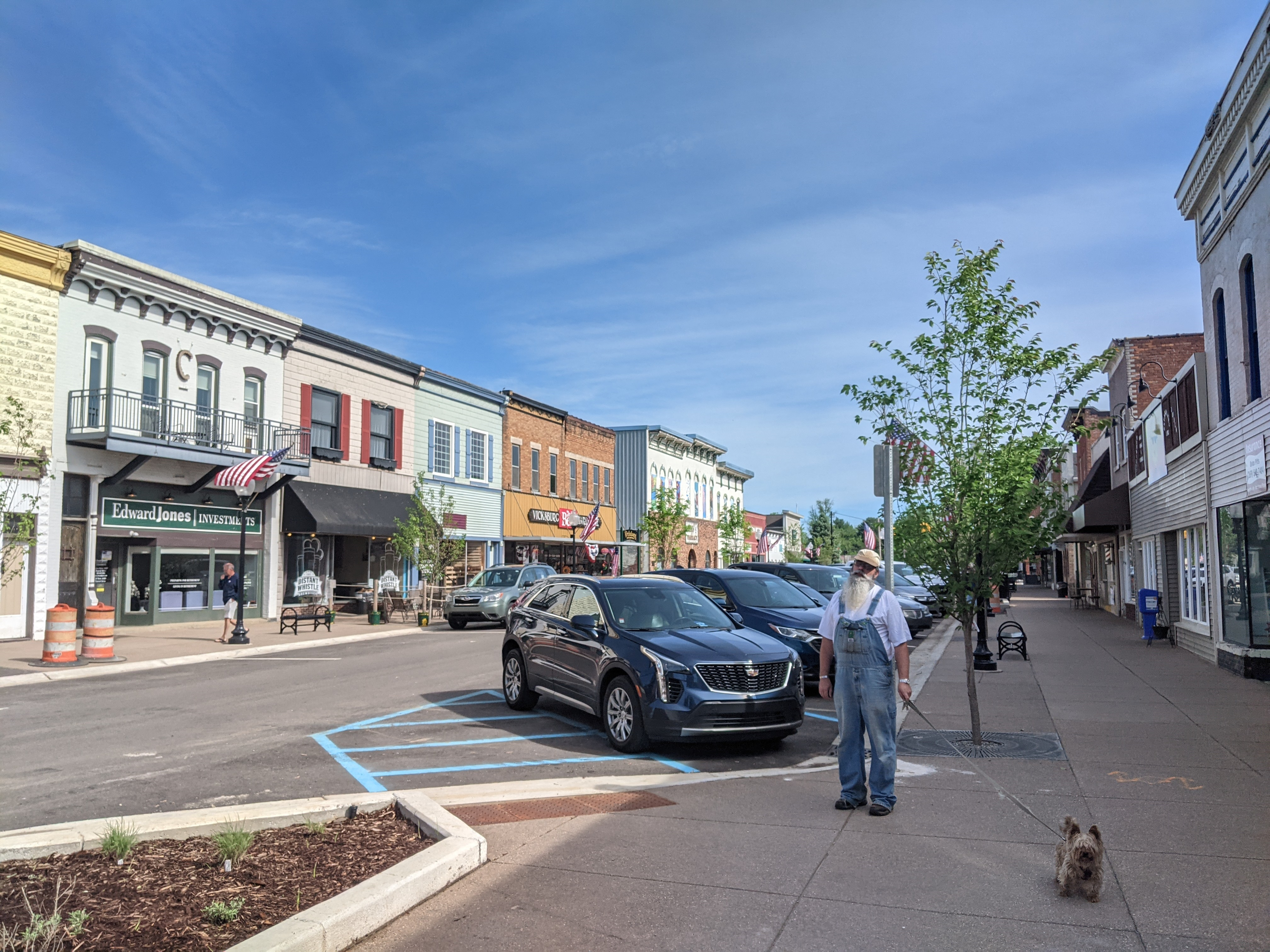
- Main Street in 2022

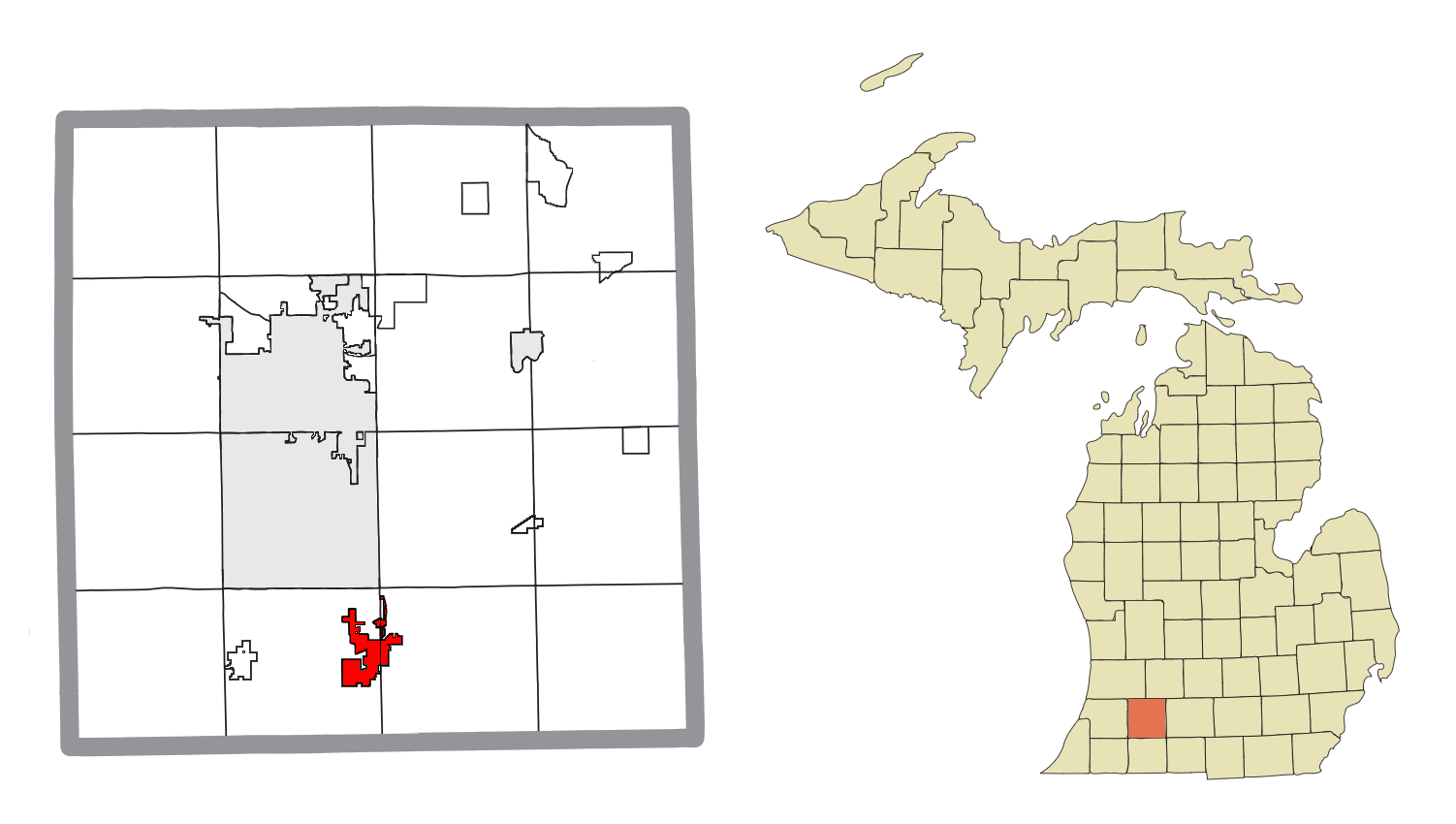
- Location within Kalamazoo County

- Location within the state of Michigan Location within the United States
- Coordinates: 42°7′14″N 85°32′3″W
- Country: United States
- State: Michigan
- County: Kalamazoo
- Townships: Schoolcraft, Brady
- Incorporated: 1871

Area
  - Total: 3.09 sq mi (8.00 km^{2})
  - Land: 2.96 sq mi (7.66 km^{2})
  - Water: 0.14 sq mi (0.35 km^{2})
- Elevation: 850 ft (260 m)

Population (2020)
  - Total: 3,706
  - Density: 1,253.8/sq mi (484.11/km^{2})
- Time zone: UTC-5 (Eastern (EST))
  - Summer (DST): UTC-4 (EDT)
- ZIP code: 49097
- Area code: 269
- FIPS code: 26-82300
- GNIS feature ID: 1615573
- Website: www.vicksburgmi.org

Vicksburg is a village in Kalamazoo County, Michigan, United States. The population was 3,706 at the 2020 census. The west part of the village is in Schoolcraft Township and the east part is in Brady Township.

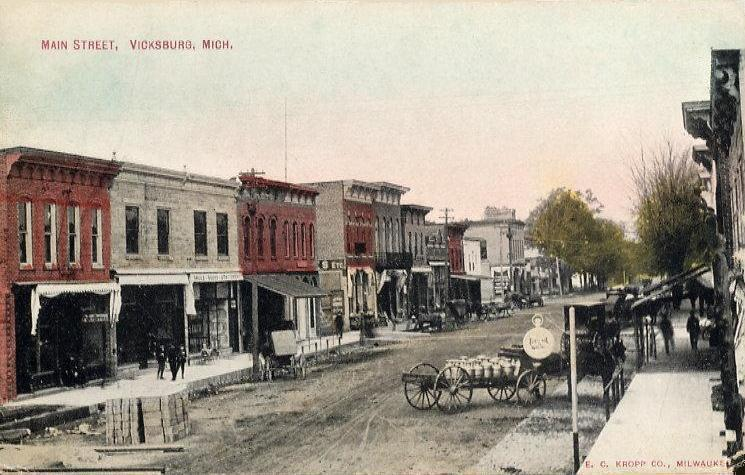
A view of Main Street Vicksburg, Michigan, 1909.

== History ==
John Vickers, the town's namesake, settled in the area in 1831. It was incorporated as a village of the state in 1871. A Michigan Registered Historic Site plaque reads:

VICKERS' MILL: In 1831, John Vickers built a brush dam over the eight-foot waterfall on Portage Creek and erected a log grist mill. The mill is believed to have been the first mill in Kalamazoo County. The dam created a pond that supplied water power to the mill and formed the sizeable Sunset Lake, around which pioneers built homes and set up businesses. Vickers died in 1842. On October 18, 1871, the village was incorporated as Brady, but one day later, a petition passed to rename it Vicksburg.

== Geography ==
According to the United States Census Bureau, the village has a total area of 3.15 square miles (8.16 km^{2}), of which 3.01 square miles (7.80 km^{2}) is land and 0.14 square miles (0.36 km^{2}) is water. Vicksburg is located on the shore of Sunset Lake.

== Demographics ==
Historical population
| Census | Pop. | Note | %± |
|---|---|---|---|
| 1880 | 784 | | — |
| 1890 | 921 | | 17.5% |
| 1900 | 972 | | 5.5% |
| 1910 | 1,624 | | 67.1% |
| 1920 | 1,712 | | 5.4% |
| 1930 | 1,735 | | 1.3% |
| 1940 | 1,774 | | 2.2% |
| 1950 | 2,171 | | 22.4% |
| 1960 | 2,224 | | 2.4% |
| 1970 | 2,139 | | −3.8% |
| 1980 | 2,224 | | 4.0% |
| 1990 | 2,216 | | −0.4% |
| 2000 | 2,320 | | 4.7% |
| 2010 | 2,906 | | 25.3% |
| 2020 | 3,706 | | 27.5% |
U.S. Decennial Census

=== 2020 census ===
As of the 2020 census, Vicksburg had a population of 3,706. The median age was 34.4 years. 28.9% of residents were under the age of 18 and 11.7% of residents were 65 years of age or older. For every 100 females there were 98.6 males, and for every 100 females age 18 and over there were 95.0 males age 18 and over.

95.3% of residents lived in urban areas, while 4.7% lived in rural areas.

There were 1,426 households in Vicksburg, of which 42.7% had children under the age of 18 living in them. Of all households, 50.4% were married-couple households, 16.1% were households with a male householder and no spouse or partner present, and 24.5% were households with a female householder and no spouse or partner present. About 21.7% of all households were made up of individuals and 8.8% had someone living alone who was 65 years of age or older.

There were 1,494 housing units, of which 4.6% were vacant. The homeowner vacancy rate was 0.2% and the rental vacancy rate was 6.1%.

Racial composition as of the 2020 census
| Race | Number | Percent |
|---|---|---|
| White | 3,266 | 88.1% |
| Black or African American | 88 | 2.4% |
| American Indian and Alaska Native | 20 | 0.5% |
| Asian | 29 | 0.8% |
| Native Hawaiian and Other Pacific Islander | 2 | 0.1% |
| Some other race | 38 | 1.0% |
| Two or more races | 263 | 7.1% |
| Hispanic or Latino (of any race) | 134 | 3.6% |

=== 2010 census ===
As of the census of 2010, there were 2,906 people, 1,120 households, and 773 families residing in the village. The population density was 965.4 inhabitants per square mile (372.7/km^{2}). There were 1,233 housing units at an average density of 409.6 per square mile (158.1/km^{2}). The racial makeup of the village was 95.9% White, 0.6% African American, 0.3% Native American, 0.6% Asian, 0.6% from other races, and 2.1% from two or more races. Hispanic or Latino of any race were 3.2% of the population.

There were 1,120 households, of which 39.8% had children under the age of 18 living with them, 48.4% were married couples living together, 14.6% had a female householder with no husband present, 6.1% had a male householder with no wife present, and 31.0% were non-families. 25.6% of all households were made up of individuals, and 8.6% had someone living alone who was 65 years of age or older. The average household size was 2.59, and the average family size was 3.12.

The median age in the village was 33 years. 28.4% of residents were under the age of 18; 7.6% were between the ages of 18 and 24; 29.3% were from 25 to 44; 23.4% were from 45 to 64; and 11.3% were 65 years of age or older. The gender makeup of the village was 49.3% male and 50.7% female.

== Education ==
Public education is provided by the Vicksburg Community Schools, which serves the village and the surrounding area. Vicksburg High School, Vicksburg Middle School, and Sunset Lake Elementary School are in the village, with two additional elementary schools located in nearby rural areas.

== Events ==
Each year during the second weekend in June, Vicksburg hosts a classic car show.

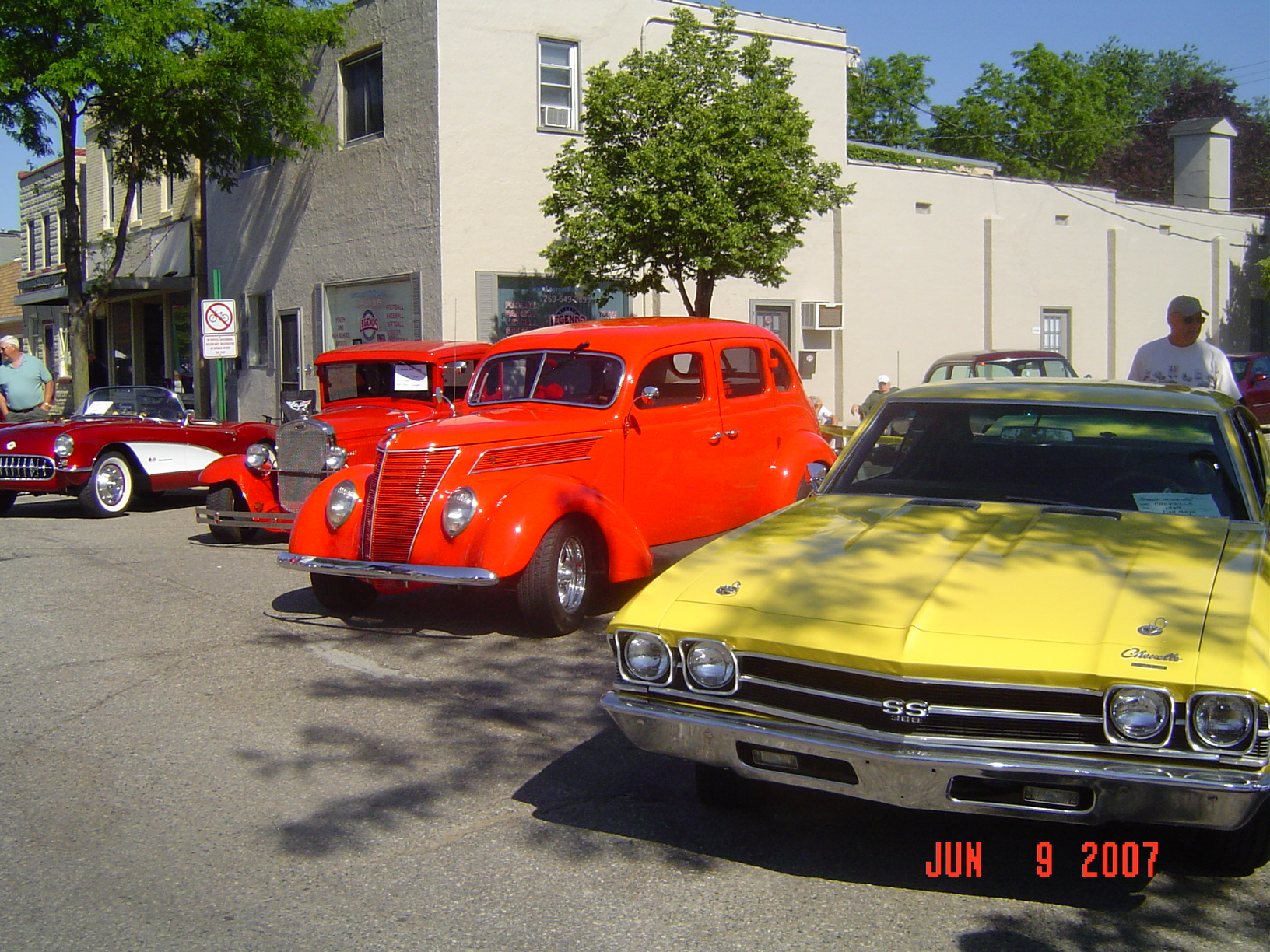

Vicksburg Car Show 2009 Vicksburg Car Show 2008 Vicksburg Car Show 2007 Vicksburg Car Show 2006

Annual Summer Festival – Located at the Vicksburg Recreation Park, The Vicksburg Lions Club has hosted this event for 37 years. The festival features Otto's Beer & Bratwurst Tent, Family Night, Volleyball and Horseshoe Tournaments, and Live Music. The B&B Annual Summer Festival begins the third Thursday in July and runs through Saturday night.

Christmas in the Village – Located within the whole town of Vicksburg, This event takes place every year in December with family fun events and a parade. It finishes off with the Christmas Tree lighting ceremony.

== Vicksburg in the national media ==
On November 14, 1977 (and continued on November 21, 1977), author Bil Gilbert wrote a long feature story in Sports Illustrated on the impact of high school football on life in a small town. He chose to write about Vicksburg High School and mentioned many local citizens and establishments in his article.

== Notable people ==
- Joe Gembis, head football coach, Wayne State University
- William Lucking, actor
- General Glenn K. Otis, US Army
- Leon Roberts, Major League Baseball outfielder, was born in Vicksburg
- Bill Snyder, pitcher for the Washington Senators 1919–1920
- Jim Thurman, TV writer, director and producer
