= Three Rivers College =

Three Rivers College may refer to:

- Three Rivers College (Connecticut), Norwich, Connecticut, US
- Three Rivers College (Missouri), Poplar Bluff, Missouri, US
- Three Rivers Academy Sixth Form College, Surrey, England, UK; a junior college

== See also ==
- Three Rivers (disambiguation)
