= Three Rivers Conference =

Three Rivers Conference may refer to several high-school sports conferences in the United States:

- Three Rivers Conference (Illinois)
- Three Rivers Conference (Indiana)
- Three Rivers Conference (Minnesota), see Southern Football Alliance
- Three Rivers Conference (Ohio), see OHSAA Southwest Region athletic conferences

== See also ==
- Three Rivers District (VHSL), Virginia
- Three Rivers (disambiguation)
- Three Rivers School District (disambiguation)
