= Chris Rose (artist) =

British wildlife artist (born 1959)

- Born: Christopher Andrew Rose; 27 August 1959 (age 66); Kilembe, Uganda
- Education: Rydens County Secondary School; University of Nottingham (BSc)
- Occupation: Wildlife artist
- Website: www.chrisrose-artist.co.uk

Christopher Andrew Rose (born 27 August 1959 in Kilembe, Uganda) is a British wildlife artist. He is member of the Society of Wildlife Artists (SWLA) since 1983.

Rose was born in Uganda where he lived until the age of six. After an education in the Rydens County Secondary School in Hersham, Surrey he studied biology at the University of Nottingham from 1979 to 1981 where he graduated to BSc. Unable to find work as a biologist he was offered a contract as illustrator for the Dorset Heritage Coast Project, where he worked until 1982. Between 2003 and 2009 he served on the board of governors of the Federation of British Artists and was secretary of the SWLA from 2009 to 2015.

Rose has illustrated several books about birds and other wildlife, including Robins and Chats (2015 by Rose and Clement) - an identification guide covering the 175 species of this family, A Handbook to the Swallows and Martins of the World (1989 by Angela Turner), Grebes of the World (2002 by Malcolm Ogilvie), and In a Natural Light, a book of his paintings with personal commentary on his own work (2005 by Rose). In addition he was among the illustrators of the Handbook of the Birds of the World, including volume 4, volume 6 to volume 12, volume 14, volume 16 and the special volume New Species and Global Index.

Rose now works purely as a painter, working chiefly in oils and acrylics, specialising in paintings of wildlife within the landscape.

== Exhibitions ==
- 2019 Chris Rose – Solo show, Rountree Tryon Gallery, London and Petworth
- 2012 Birds of the World – Tryon Gallery, London
- 2011 Artists for Albatrosses – Two-man show, Air Gallery, London
- 2009 Chris Rose – recent paintings – Solo show, Wildlife Art Gallery, Lavenham; Between the Tides – Solo show, Waterson House, Aberlady
- 2007 Natural moments – Three-man show, Wildlife Art Gallery, Lavenham
- 2006 ‘White Horizons’, Exhibition of Antarctic paintings, Edinburgh International Conference Centre
- 2006 The Great Fen – ANF group show, Byard Gallery, Cambridge
- 2005 In a Natural Light – Solo show, Wildlife Art Gallery, Lavenham; Aig an Oir – SWLA group show, Edinburgh Botanic Gardens, Edinburgh
- 2004 Treasures of the Forgotten Forest – ANF group show, Wildlife Art Gallery, Lavenham
- 2003 Chris Rose – Solo show, Wildlife Art Gallery, Lavenham
- 2001 Chris Rose – Solo show, Wildlife Art Gallery, Lavenham
- 2000 Drawn to the Forest – SWLA group show, Wildlife Art Gallery, Lavenham
- 1995 Extramudura – ANF group show, Wildlife Art Gallery, Lavenham
- 1993 Portrait of a Living Marsh – ANF group show, Wildlife Art Gallery, Lavenham; Wildlife – the Artist's View – Group show, Leigh Yawkey Woodson Art Museum, Wisconsin, USA
- 1992 Birds in Art – Group show, Leigh Yawkey Woodson Art Museum, Wisconsin, USA
- 1990 Wildlife Art – Three-man show, Wildlife Art Gallery, Lavenham
- 1984 – current; Annual exhibition of SWLA, Mall Galleries, London

== Awards ==
- 1986 Bird Illustrator of the Year (British Birds journal)
- 1991 European Bird Artist of the Year
- 2001 European Bird Artist of the Year – black and white category winner
- 2005 European Bird Artist of the Year (Swarovski and Birdwatch magazine)
- 2018 David Shepherd Wildlife Artist of the Year category winner
