= Bill Snyder (baseball) =

American baseball player (1898-1934)

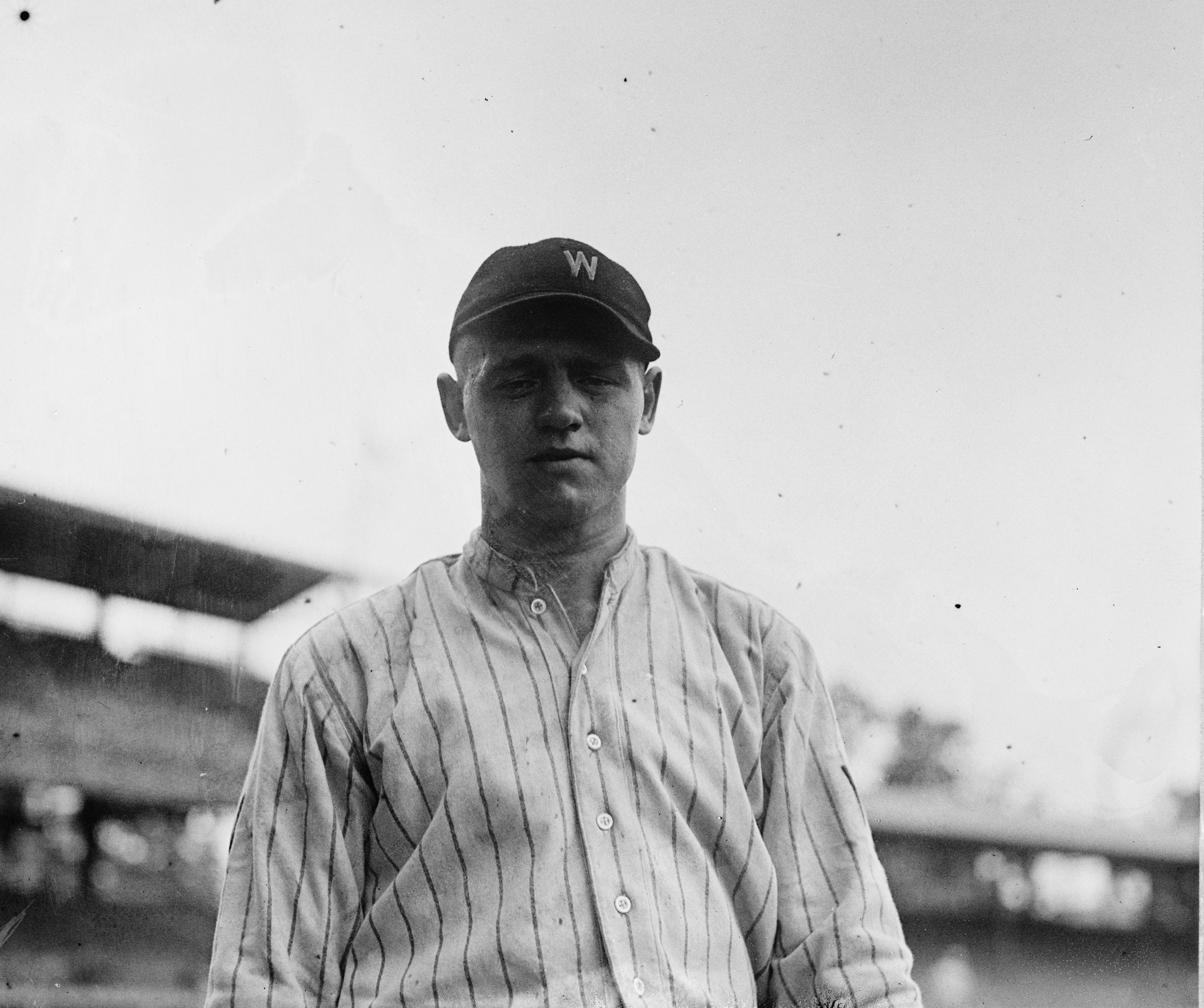
- Pitcher
- Born: January 28, 1898; Mansfield, Ohio
- Died: October 8, 1934 (aged 36); Vicksburg, Michigan
- Batted: Right Threw: Right

MLB debut
- September 14, 1919, for the Washington Senators

Last MLB appearance
- July 20, 1920, for the Washington Senators

MLB statistics
- Win–loss record: 2-2
- Earned run average: 3.77
- Strikeouts: 22
- Stats at Baseball Reference

Teams
- Washington Senators (1919–1920)

William Nicholas Snyder (January 28, 1898 – October 8, 1934) was an American Major League Baseball pitcher from Mansfield, Ohio who appeared in 18 games between 1919 and 1920 for the Washington Senators.

Snyder died in Vicksburg, Michigan on October 8, 1934.
