= Tres Rios =

Tres Rios may refer to:

- Três Rios, Rio de Janeiro, Brazil
- Tres Ríos, Cartago, Costa Rica
- Desarrollo Urbano Tres Ríos (Tres Ríos), Culiacán, Sinaloa, Mexico

== See also ==
- Trois-Rivières (disambiguation)
- Three Rivers (disambiguation)
