= Sanhe, Yilong County =

Sanhe 三河镇
- Town
- Location in Sichuan
- Coordinates: 31°24′51″N 106°43′40″E
- Country: People's Republic of China
- Province: Sichuan
- Prefecture-level city: Nanchong
- County: Yilong
- Village-level divisions: 1 residential community 20 villages
- Elevation: 341 m (1,119 ft)
- Time zone: UTC+8 (China Standard)
- Area code: 0817

Sanhe (Chinese: 三河; pinyin: Sānhé; lit. 'three rivers') is a town in Yilong County in northeastern Sichuan province, China, located 43 kilometres (27 mi) northeast of the county seat. As of 2018, it has one residential community (社区) and 20 villages under its administration.
