= Three Rivers East =

- Location within Gauteng Location within South Africa
- Coordinates: 26.660°S 28.007°E
- Country: South Africa
- Province: Gauteng
- District: Sedibeng
- Municipality: Emfuleni
- Main Place: Vereeniging

Area
  - Total: 3.09 km^{2} (1.19 sq mi)

Population (2011)
  - Total: 2,547
  - Density: 824/km^{2} (2,130/sq mi)

Racial makeup (2011)
  - Black African: 21.9%
  - Coloured: 0.7%
  - Indian/Asian: 0.5%
  - White: 76.2%
  - Other: 0.7%

First languages (2011)
  - Afrikaans: 58.5%
  - English: 23.1%
  - Sotho: 9.0%
  - Zulu: 3.9%
  - Other: 5.4%
- Time zone: UTC+2 (SAST)
- Postal code (street): 1929
- PO box: 1941

Three Rivers East is a suburb of Vereeniging, Gauteng. The suburb lies on the easternmost end of the city, bordered by the Sugarbush river to the south and east and by an eco estate called Summerview Estate to the West.

Three Rivers East is home to many people working in the nearby Johannesburg due to easy access to the R59 Freeway linking the two cities. It is also home to some of Vereeniging's wealthiest families and together with the suburb of Three Rivers Proper contribute to the majority of the tax income for the local municipality. Many of these families live in either Fisheagle Street, or Heron Avenue, next to the Sugarbush river. The suburb is currently being converted into the Three Rivers East Security Estate.

All the streets in the suburb are named after bird species found in South Africa with the exception of Hawthorn street, which is named after a tree. Other places of interest include: Weaver's Nest conference centre, Suikerbos (Sugarbush) Laerskool and Riverside High School. The suburb is also situated close to many other schools and shopping centres.

There are two wildlife conservation areas situated around the suburb. The first forms part of the Summerview Eco estate, and the other is situated next to the Sugarbush River and is in fact part of Three Rivers Proper. The conservation areas are funded and cared for by the residents of the two neighbourhoods. There is a wide range of game found in these two areas including; Black Wildebeest, Kudu, Waterbuck, Porcupine, Impala and Springbok.

Many new developments have sprung up around Three Rivers East including:

- Fisheagle Estate
- Jazella del Rio Estate
- Summerview Estate
- Three Rivers East Ext. 2
- Uitvlught Estate (Unfinished)
