= Rare Breeding Birds Panel =

- RBBP Logo
- Abbreviation: RBBP
- Formation: 1968
- Purpose: To collate breeding data on all species of rare breeding bird in the UK in order to report annually on their numbers, trends and distribution, and maintain a secure archive to support conservation and research for these species.
- Region served: United Kingdom
- Chair: Dawn Balmer
- Website: rbbp.org.uk

The Rare Breeding Birds Panel (RBBP) is an ornithological body which collects data on the breeding attempts and successes of the rarer species of birds breeding in the United Kingdom. It was created in 1968 as a subcommittee of the RSPB, with representation from the Nature Conservancy Council (NCC) and British Birds magazine.

In December 1972 it became an autonomous body, financed jointly by the BTO, RSPB, British Birds and, later, the NCC. The formation of the RBBP as an independent body was announced in April 1973, and data on rare breeding birds was reported on for the years 1973 onwards. Its role was given as:

The aims of the Panel are to collect in one place all information on rare breeding birds so that changes in status—both increases and decreases—can be monitored, and so that essential information is not lost (as has happened in the past) through the deaths of those keeping rare breeding records secret.

The panel collects data on more than 160 species of rare and scarce breeding birds in the UK. These are divided into four categories:

- Category A - Rare species
- Category B - Less scarce species
- Category C - Less scarce and widespread species
- Category D - Rare non-native species

The panel's logo is a black-necked grebe.

== Members ==
In order to maintain their neutrality, panel members are appointed in a personal capacity, and so do not formally represent their employing or sponsoring organisation.

=== Former ===
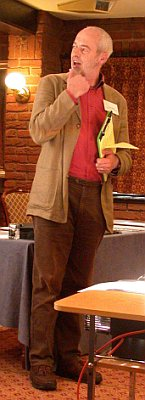
Bibby at the West Midland Bird Club's 'Bird Club Forum' at Lea Marston, Warwickshire, in February 2004

Former members have included:

- Peter Conder (founding member, 1968)
- Colin Bibby
- Malcolm Ogilvie (Secretary, 1993–2006)

== See also ==
- British Birds Rarities Committee
