= Three Rivers, Michigan =

- City
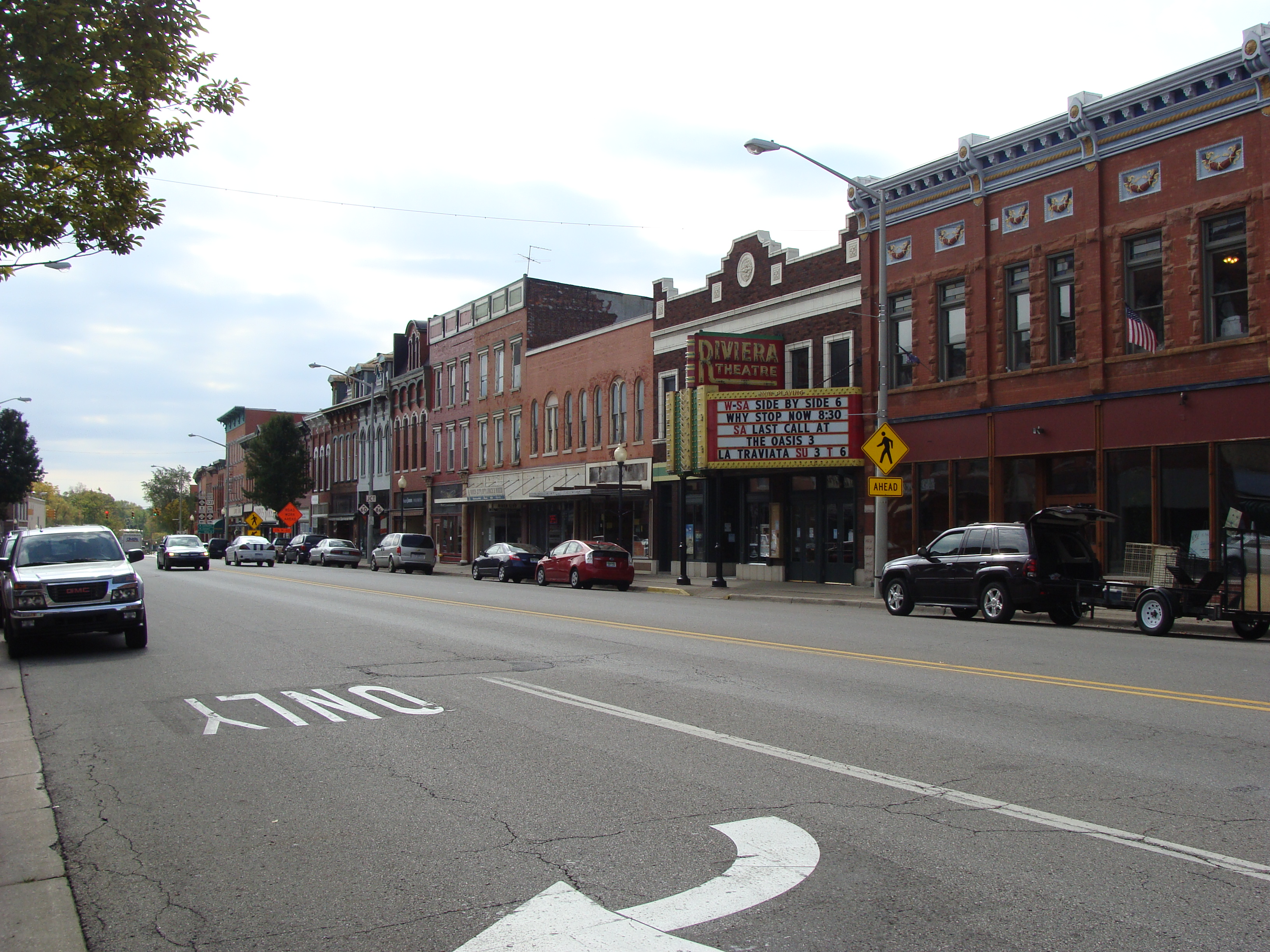
- Downtown Three Rivers

- Flag

- Location of Three Rivers, Michigan
- Coordinates: 41°56′39″N 85°37′56″W
- Country: United States
- State: Michigan
- County: St. Joseph

Area
  - Total: 5.83 sq mi (15.10 km^{2})
  - Land: 5.56 sq mi (14.40 km^{2})
  - Water: 0.27 sq mi (0.70 km^{2})
- Elevation: 804 ft (245 m)

Population (2020)
  - Total: 7,973
  - Density: 1,433.7/sq mi (553.55/km^{2})
- Time zone: UTC−5 (Eastern (EST))
  - Summer (DST): UTC−4 (EDT)
- ZIP code: 49093
- Area code: 269
- FIPS code: 26-79760
- GNIS feature ID: 1624987
- Website: City website

Three Rivers is a city in St. Joseph County. The population was 7,973 at the time of the 2020 census.

Three Rivers derives its name from its location at the confluence of the St. Joseph River and two tributaries, the Rocky and Portage rivers. The St. Joseph River flows into Lake Michigan.

The city is the home of St. Gregory's Abbey, a Benedictine monastery of the Episcopal Church, which was established in 1946.

On the morning of August 6, 2024 an EF2 tornado struck the north side of Three Rivers.

On March 6, 2026, a significant tornado impacted much of Three Rivers, damaging numerous homes and businesses. A PDS tornado warning was issued along with this storm. This tornado was part of a larger tornado outbreak impacting much of the central United States. The same isolated supercell thunderstorm that produced the Three Rivers tornado later produced the devastating March 6, 2026, Union City tornado.

== Geography ==
According to the United States Census Bureau, the city has a total area of 5.66 square miles (14.66 km^{2}), of which 5.40 square miles (13.99 km^{2}) is land and 0.26 square miles (0.67 km^{2}) is water.

=== Highways ===
- US 131
- Bus. US 131
- M-60
- M-86

=== Climate ===
Climate data for Three Rivers, Michigan (1991–2020 normals, extremes 1895–present)
Month	Jan	Feb	Mar	Apr	May	Jun	Jul	Aug	Sep	Oct	Nov	Dec	Year
Record high °F (°C)	67 (19)	74 (23)	83 (28)	88 (31)	97 (36)	104 (40)	107 (42)	100 (38)	103 (39)	93 (34)	81 (27)	72 (22)	107 (42)
Mean daily maximum °F (°C)	31.2 (−0.4)	34.4 (1.3)	45.0 (7.2)	57.8 (14.3)	69.4 (20.8)	78.6 (25.9)	82.3 (27.9)	80.2 (26.8)	74.1 (23.4)	61.2 (16.2)	47.4 (8.6)	36.1 (2.3)	58.1 (14.5)
Daily mean °F (°C)	23.9 (−4.5)	26.1 (−3.3)	35.4 (1.9)	47.0 (8.3)	58.5 (14.7)	67.9 (19.9)	71.4 (21.9)	69.6 (20.9)	62.6 (17.0)	50.7 (10.4)	39.1 (3.9)	29.4 (−1.4)	48.5 (9.2)
Mean daily minimum °F (°C)	16.7 (−8.5)	17.8 (−7.9)	25.9 (−3.4)	36.2 (2.3)	47.6 (8.7)	57.2 (14.0)	60.5 (15.8)	58.9 (14.9)	51.0 (10.6)	40.2 (4.6)	30.9 (−0.6)	22.8 (−5.1)	38.8 (3.8)
Record low °F (°C)	−23 (−31)	−20 (−29)	−11 (−24)	7 (−14)	23 (−5)	34 (1)	41 (5)	35 (2)	25 (−4)	13 (−11)	−6 (−21)	−15 (−26)	−23 (−31)
Average precipitation inches (mm)	2.85 (72)	2.06 (52)	2.30 (58)	3.35 (85)	4.40 (112)	4.10 (104)	3.99 (101)	3.95 (100)	3.58 (91)	3.69 (94)	3.04 (77)	2.35 (60)	39.66 (1,007)
Average snowfall inches (cm)	15.0 (38)	9.7 (25)	3.7 (9.4)	0.6 (1.5)	0.0 (0.0)	0.0 (0.0)	0.0 (0.0)	0.0 (0.0)	0.0 (0.0)	0.0 (0.0)	2.9 (7.4)	9.3 (24)	41.2 (105)
Average precipitation days (≥ 0.01 in)	15.2	11.8	11.3	12.7	13.4	11.0	9.7	10.7	9.7	11.9	12.6	14.3	144.3
Average snowy days (≥ 0.1 in)	9.8	7.1	3.3	0.6	0.0	0.0	0.0	0.0	0.0	0.1	1.9	7.4	30.2
Source: NOAA

== Demographics ==
Historical population
Census	Pop.	Note	%±
1860	957		—
1870	1,189		24.2%
1880	2,525		112.4%
1890	3,131		24.0%
1900	3,550		13.4%
1910	5,072		42.9%
1920	5,209		2.7%
1930	6,863		31.8%
1940	6,710		−2.2%
1950	6,785		1.1%
1960	7,092		4.5%
1970	7,355		3.7%
1980	7,015		−4.6%
1990	7,413		5.7%
2000	7,328		−1.1%
2010	7,811		6.6%
2020	7,973		2.1%
U.S. Decennial Census

=== 2020 census ===
As of the 2020 census, Three Rivers had a population of 7,973. The median age was 34.3 years. 26.5% of residents were under the age of 18 and 13.8% of residents were 65 years of age or older. For every 100 females there were 92.1 males, and for every 100 females age 18 and over there were 89.6 males age 18 and over.

100.0% of residents lived in urban areas, while 0.0% lived in rural areas.

There were 3,163 households in Three Rivers, of which 32.8% had children under the age of 18 living in them. Of all households, 32.5% were married-couple households, 22.0% were households with a male householder and no spouse or partner present, and 35.3% were households with a female householder and no spouse or partner present. About 34.3% of all households were made up of individuals and 13.0% had someone living alone who was 65 years of age or older.

There were 3,435 housing units, of which 7.9% were vacant. The homeowner vacancy rate was 2.1% and the rental vacancy rate was 3.6%.

Racial composition as of the 2020 census
Race	Number	Percent
White	6,180	77.5%
Black or African American	731	9.2%
American Indian and Alaska Native	42	0.5%
Asian	77	1.0%
Native Hawaiian and Other Pacific Islander	2	0.0%
Some other race	212	2.7%
Two or more races	729	9.1%
Hispanic or Latino (of any race)	520	6.5%

=== 2010 census ===
As of the census of 2010, there were 7,811 people. The 49093 Three Rivers zip code population as of 2010 stands at just shy of 20,000 people. There were 3,048 households and 1,862 families residing in the city. The population density was 1,446.5 inhabitants per square mile (558.5/km^{2}). There were 3,519 housing units at an average density of 651.7 per square mile (251.6/km^{2}). The racial makeup of the city was 82.6% White, 10.1% African American, 0.6% Native American, 0.9% Asian, 1.8% from other races, and 4.0% from two or more races. Hispanic or Latino of any race were 5.2% of the population.

There were 3,048 households, of which 36.9% had children under the age of 18 living with them, 35.2% were married couples living together, 19.7% had a female householder with no husband present, 6.2% had a male householder with no wife present, and 38.9% were non-families. 32.5% of all households were made up of individuals, and 12.5% had someone living alone who was 65 years of age or older. The average household size was 2.50 and the average family size was 3.15.

The median age in the city was 31.5 years. 28.5% of residents were under the age of 18; 10.6% were between the ages of 18 and 24; 27.3% were from 25 to 44; 21.5% were from 45 to 64; and 12% were 65 years of age or older. The gender makeup of the city was 47.7% male and 52.3% female.

=== 2000 census ===
As of 2000 the median income for a household in the city was $32,460, and the median income for a family was $36,272. Males had a median income of $31,849 versus $23,659 for females. The per capita income for the city was $16,279. About 16.2% of families and 19.3% of the population were below the poverty line, including 25.5% of those under age 18 and 9.4% of those age 65 or over.

== Education ==
Public education for Three Rivers and the surrounding area is provided by the Three Rivers Community Schools.

=== Secondary schools ===
- Three Rivers High School
- Three Rivers Middle School

=== Elementary schools ===
- Andrews
- Norton
- Park
- Ruth Hoppin

Private schools include Immaculate Conception School and Heartwood Renaissance Academy.

Since 1965 the summer school of the Latvian Cultural Center Gaŗezers works in Three Rivers.

== Notable people ==
- Neal Ball, first player in Major League Baseball history to pull off an unassisted triple play; played for Three Rivers's semi-pro team in 1901.
- Harry Blackstone Jr., magician; was born in Three Rivers.
- Daniel Booko, actor known for The Suite Life of Zack & Cody, Hannah Montana, and iCarly
- Paul Christy, former professional wrestler
- Charles Collingwood, CBS television news correspondent
- David R. Leitch, former member of the Illinois General Assembly
- Pete Metzelaars, former NFL player
- Jack Perrin, silent film actor
- Matt Thornton, retired professional baseball player
