= Sanhe Subdistrict, Chengdu =

Sanhe Subdistrict 三河街道
- Subdistrict
- Location in Sichuan
- Coordinates: 30°46′50″N 104°7′51″E
- Country: People's Republic of China
- Province: Sichuan
- Prefecture-level city: Chengdu
- District: Xindu District
- Time zone: UTC+8 (China Standard)

Sanhe Subdistrict (Chinese: 三河街道; pinyin: Sānhé Jiēdào) is a subdistrict in Xindu District, Chengdu, Sichuan, China. As of 2018, it has 8 residential communities under its administration.

== See also ==
- List of township-level divisions of Sichuan
