= Texas Residential Construction Commission =

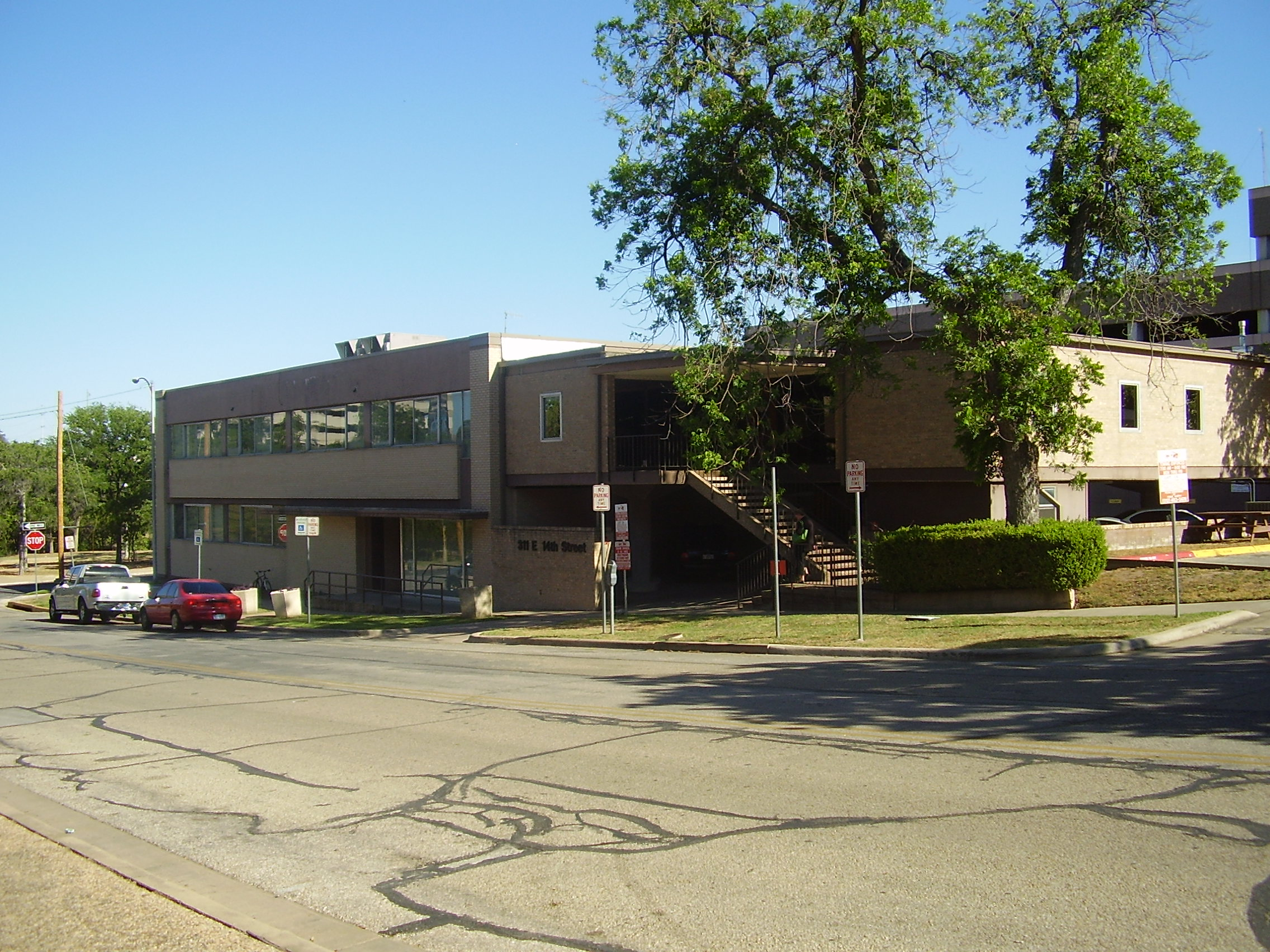
311 East 14th Street, the former headquarters of the commission

Texas Residential Construction Commission is a defunct Texas state agency that oversaw single family residential housing construction. The agency was headquartered at 311 East 14th Street in Austin.

Its mission was to promote quality construction for Texans by registering industry members and residential construction projects; providing information and educating homeowners and the residential construction industry; acting as a resource for complainants; and offering a neutral, technical review of alleged post-construction defects.

During the 81st legislative session in 2009, the commission was under sunset review and legislation renewing its existence was not passed. The commission officially closed September 1, 2010 (pursuant to provisions under Sec. 325.017 of the Government Code). All records and property were transferred to the Texas Comptroller of Public Accounts.
