= Brady Township, Kalamazoo County, Michigan =

Brady Township, Michigan
- Charter township
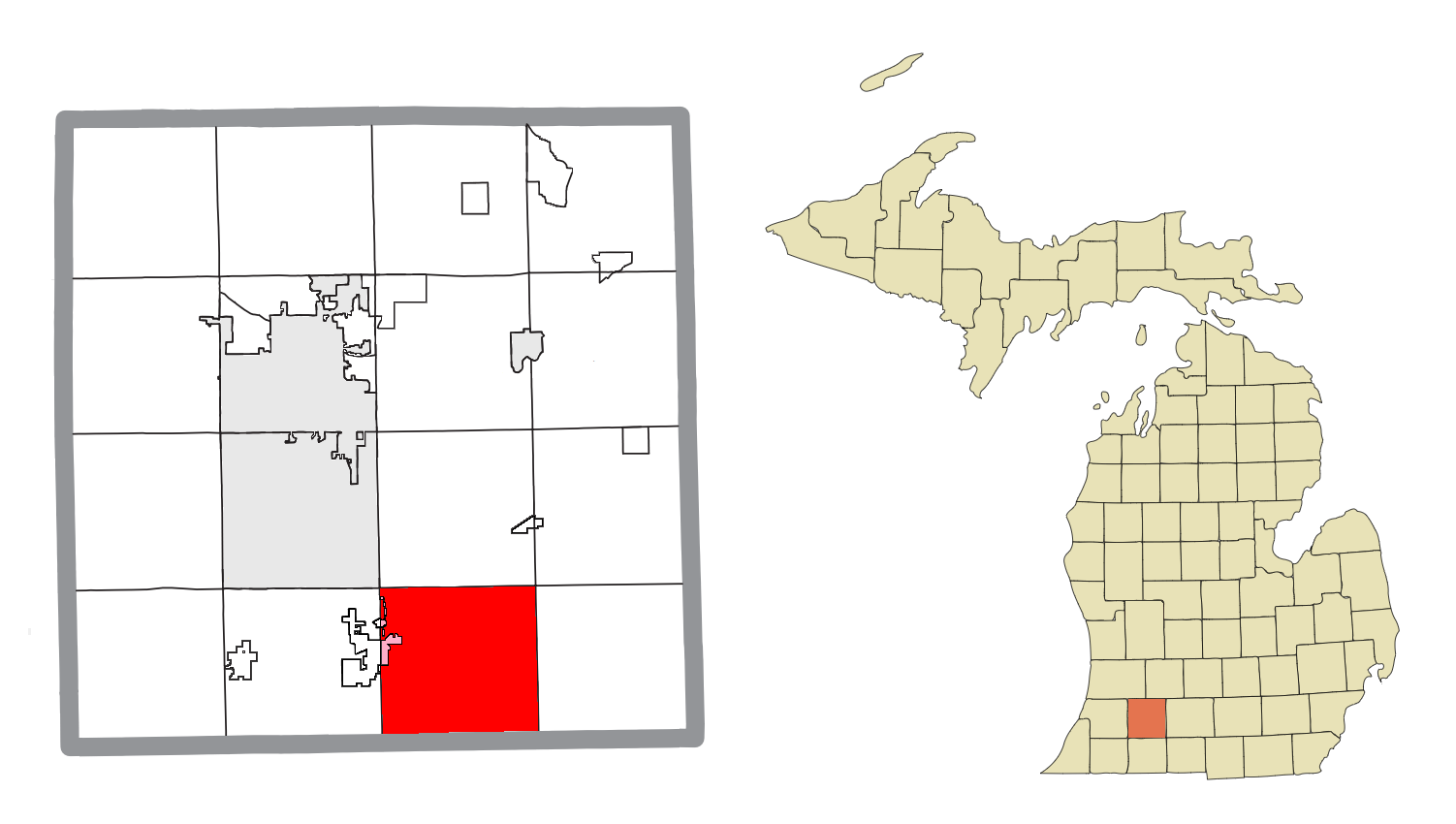
- Location within Kalamazoo County and an administered portion of the village of Vicksburg

- Location within the state of Michigan Location within the United States
- Coordinates: 42°7′19″N 85°29′13″W
- Country: United States
- State: Michigan
- County: Kalamazoo

Area
  - Total: 36.3 sq mi (93.9 km^{2})
  - Land: 34.8 sq mi (90.2 km^{2})
  - Water: 1.4 sq mi (3.7 km^{2})
- Elevation: 850 ft (260 m)

Population (2020)
  - Total: 4,445
  - Density: 128/sq mi (49.3/km^{2})
- Time zone: UTC-5 (Eastern (EST))
  - Summer (DST): UTC-4 (EDT)
- FIPS code: 26-077-09920
- GNIS feature ID: 1625967
- Website: www.bradytwp.org

Brady Township is a charter township of Kalamazoo County in the U.S. state of Michigan. As of the 2020 census, the township population was 4,445. The township adopted charter status by a vote of the board of trustees on January 3, 2024.

== Communities ==
- The village of Vicksburg is located partially within the township on the west side.

== Geography ==
According to the United States Census Bureau, the township has a total area of 36.3 square miles (93.9 km^{2}), of which 34.8 square miles (90.2 km^{2}) are land and 1.4 square miles (3.7 km^{2}), or 3.94%, are water, the majority of which is Indian Lake.

== Demographics ==
As of the census of 2000, there were 4,263 people, 1,554 households, and 1,246 families residing in the township. The population density was 122.1 inhabitants per square mile (47.1/km^{2}). There were 1,690 housing units at an average density of 48.4 per square mile (18.7/km^{2}). The racial makeup of the township was 97.42% White, 0.16% African American, 0.26% Native American, 0.33% Asian, 0.66% from other races, and 1.17% from two or more races. Hispanic or Latino of any race were 1.01% of the population.

There were 1,554 households, out of which 36.5% had children under the age of 18 living with them, 69.7% were married couples living together, 7.2% had a female householder with no husband present, and 19.8% were non-families. 15.7% of all households were made up of individuals, and 5.9% had someone living alone who was 65 years of age or older. The average household size was 2.74 and the average family size was 3.05.

In the township the population was spread out, with 27.6% under the age of 18, 6.0% from 18 to 24, 27.4% from 25 to 44, 27.4% from 45 to 64, and 11.6% who were 65 years of age or older. The median age was 39 years. For every 100 females, there were 97.5 males. For every 100 females age 18 and over, there were 95.9 males.

The median income for a household in the township was $52,202, and the median income for a family was $57,316. Males had a median income of $39,963 versus $27,256 for females. The per capita income for the township was $22,229. About 2.0% of families and 3.4% of the population were below the poverty line, including 3.2% of those under age 18 and 4.4% of those age 65 or over.
