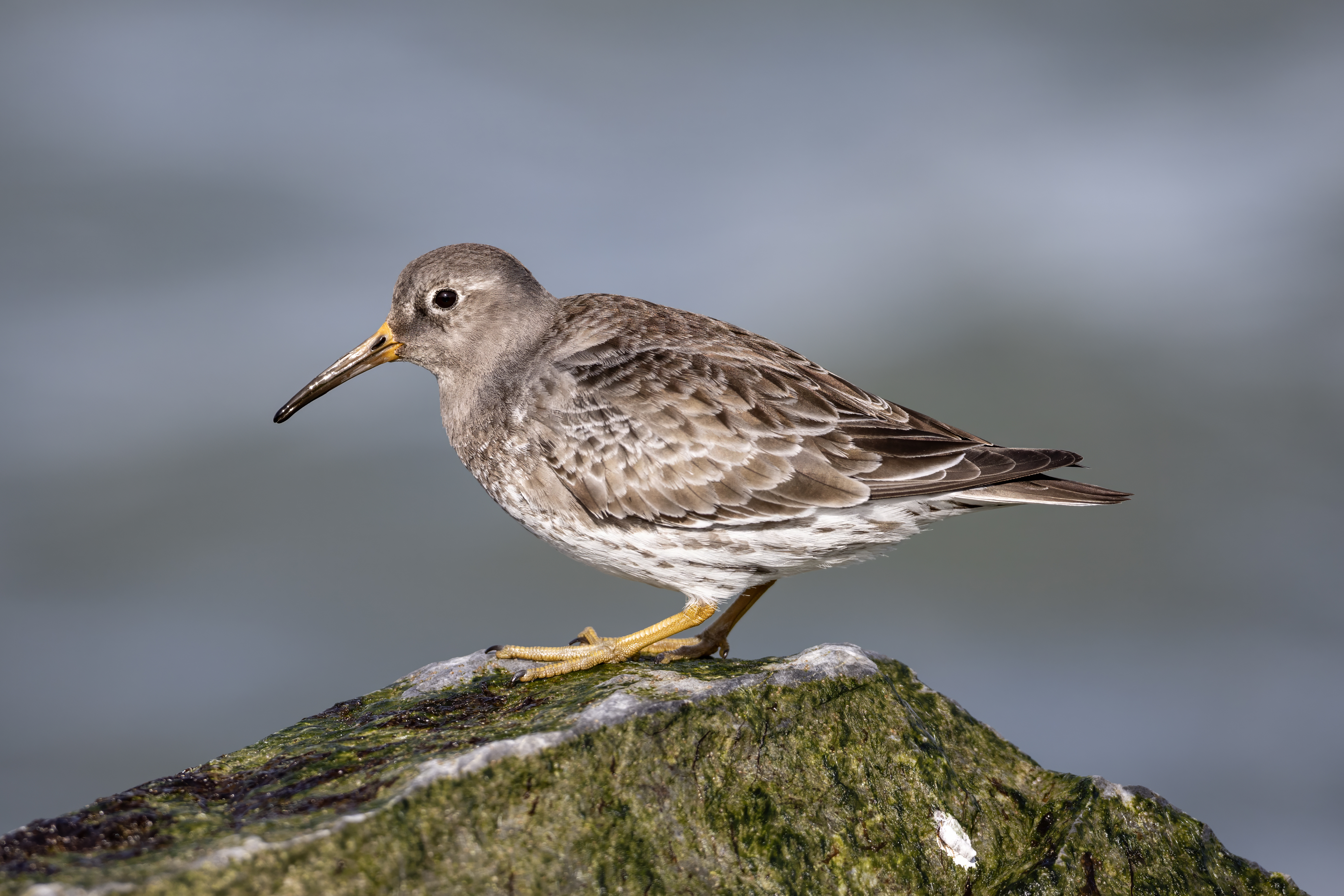

Conservation status
- Least Concern (IUCN 3.1)

Scientific classification
- Kingdom: Animalia
- Phylum: Chordata
- Class: Aves
- Order: Charadriiformes
- Family: Scolopacidae
- Genus: Calidris
- Species: C. maritima

Binomial name
- Calidris maritima (Brünnich, 1764)
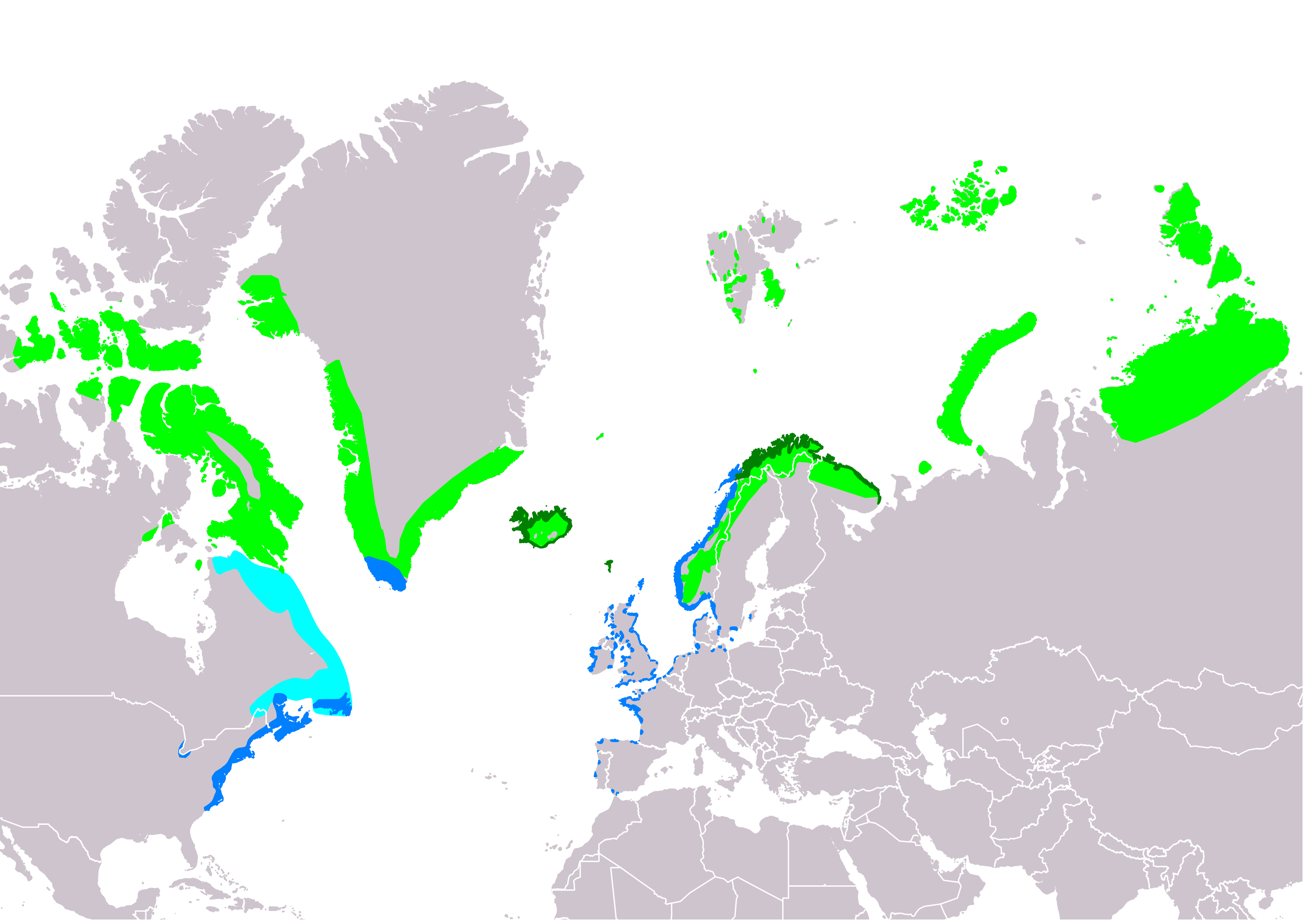
- Range of C. maritima Breeding Resident Non-breeding Passage

Synonyms
- Tringa maritima Brünnich, 1764; Erolia maritima (Brünnich, 1764); Arquatella maritima (Brünnich, 1764); Tringa striata Linnaeus, 1766

= Purple sandpiper =

Species of bird

The purple sandpiper (Calidris maritima) is a small shorebird in the sandpiper family Scolopacidae. This is a hardy sandpiper that breeds in the arctic and subarctic regions of Eurasia and North America and winters further south on the Atlantic coast.

== Taxonomy ==
The purple sandpiper was formally described in 1764 by the Danish zoologist Morten Thrane Brünnich and given the binomial name Tringa maratina. This species was formerly placed in the genus Erolia, but is now placed with 23 other sandpipers in the genus Calidris that was introduced in 1804 by the German naturalist Blasius Merrem. The genus name is from Ancient Greek kalidris or skalidris, a term used by Aristotle for some grey-coloured waterside birds. The specific epithet maritima is from Latin and means "of the sea", from mare, "sea". The purple sandpiper is currently treated as monotypic with no subspecies recognised, though historically birds from Greenland were sometimes distinguished as C. m. groenlandica Løvenskiold, 1950 and birds from Iceland as C. m. littoralis (Brehm, 1831). Within the genus Calidris the purple sandpiper is sister to the rock sandpiper (Calidris ptilocnemis) and is closely related to the sanderling (Calidris alba) and the dunlin (Calidris alpina).

== Description ==
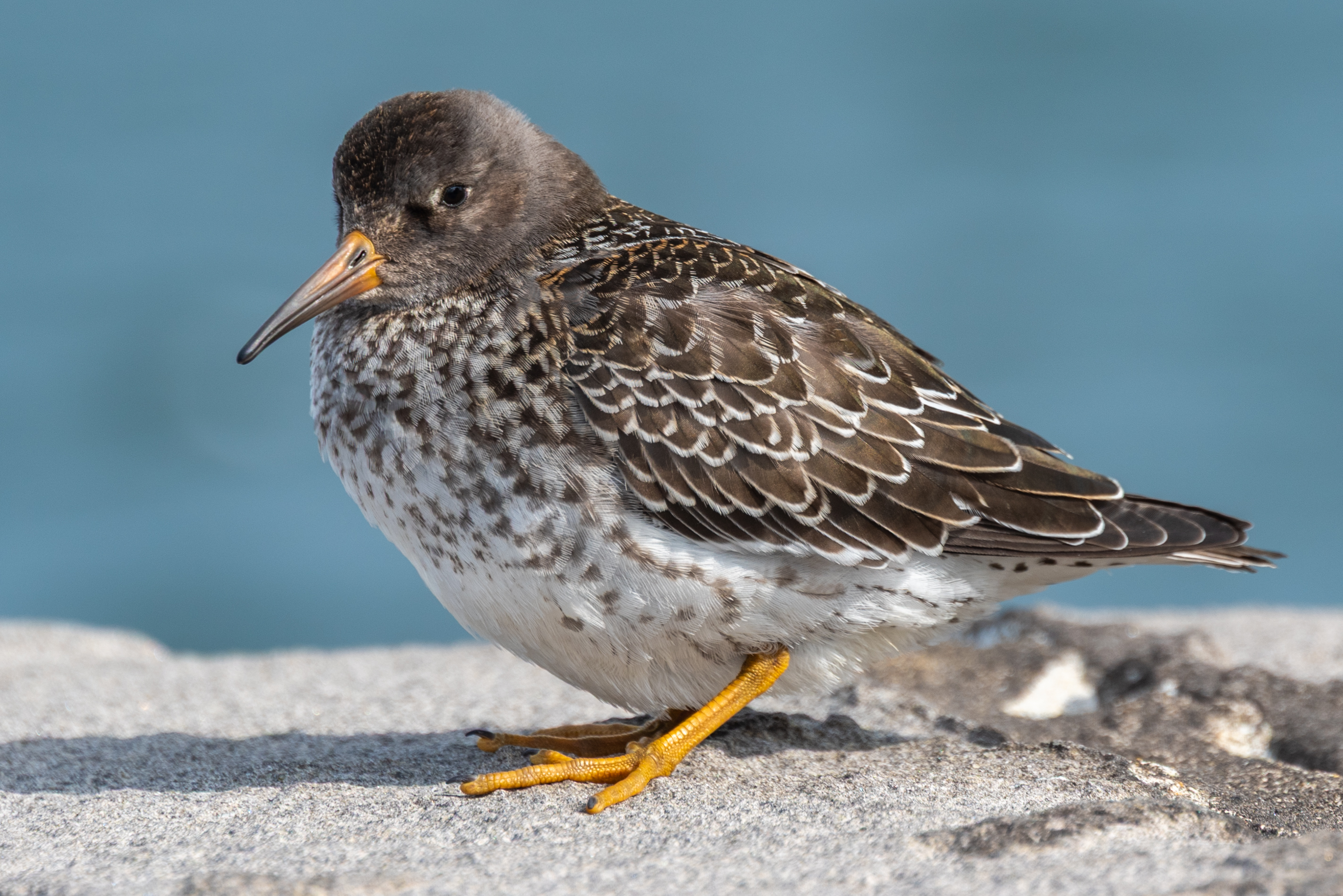
Summer plumage

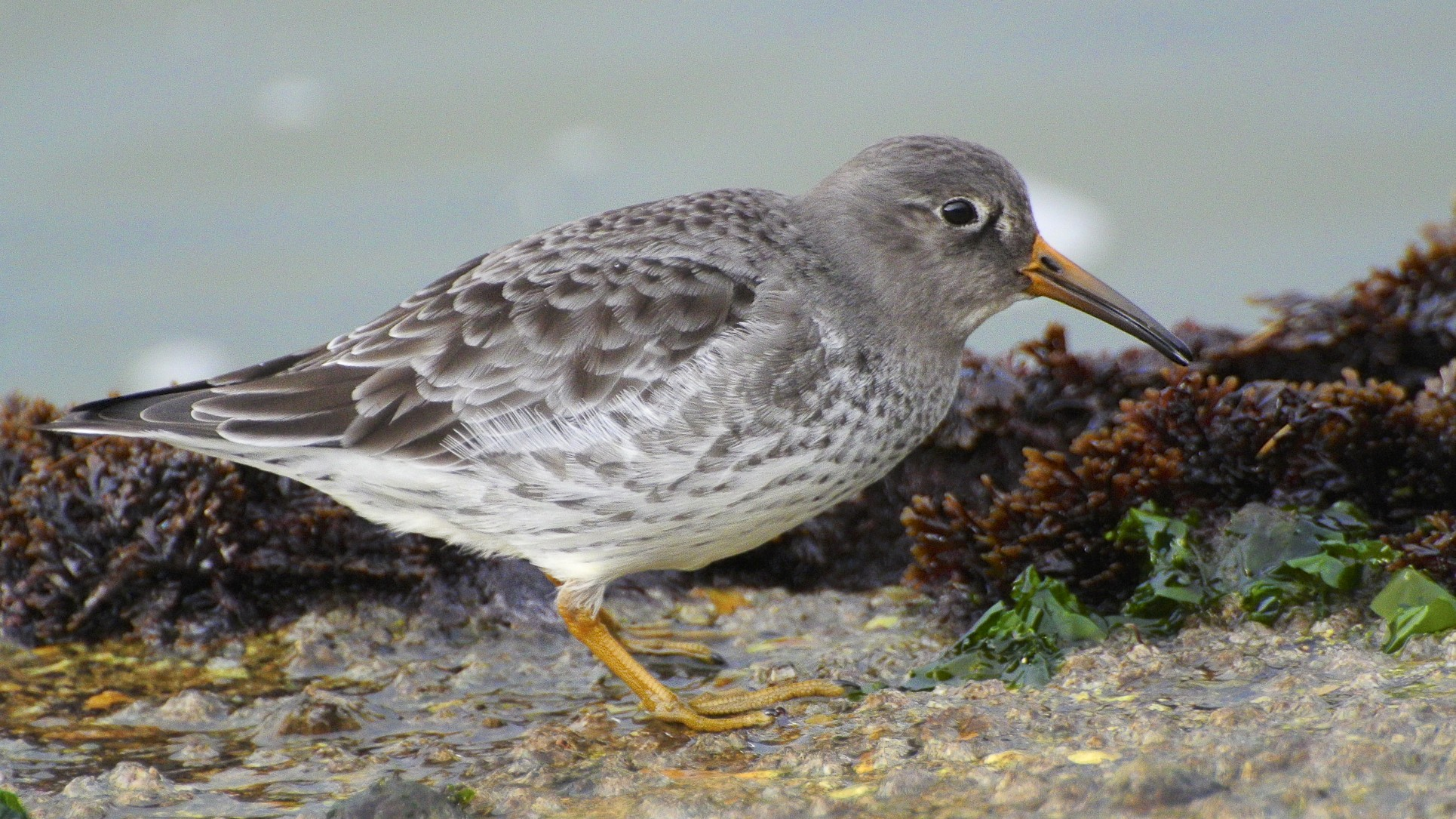
Winter plumage

Adults have short yellow legs and a medium thin dark bill with a yellow base. The body is dark on top with a slight purplish gloss and mainly white underneath. The breast is smeared with grey and the rump is black. They measure 20–22 cm (7.9–8.7 in) in length and 42–46 cm (17–18 in) across the wings, and weight is from 50–105 g (1.8–3.7 oz).

Standard measurements
Total Body Length	210–240 mm (8.1–9.5 in)
Wingspan	430 mm (17 in)
Weight	70 g (2.5 oz)
Wing	117.9–130 mm (4.64–5.12 in)
Tail	55.9–63 mm (2.20–2.48 in)
Culmen	27.2–32 mm (1.07–1.26 in)
Tarsus	22–23.8 mm (0.87–0.94 in)

== Distribution and habitat ==
The purple sandpiper's breeding range extends from the arctic islands of northern Canada, eastwards to Greenland, Iceland, Svalbard and northern Scandinavia across to Western Siberia and the Taymyr Peninsula. In the high arctic the sandpiper breeds at low altitude on the tundra, sometimes far from the coastline, but in the subarctic regions of Sweden and Norway it breeds on barren mountain sides near the limit of the frozen ground. Birds breeding at high latitudes migrate south and spend the winter on rocky shores on both sides of the north Atlantic. They winter along the North America coast as far south as South Carolina and on the eastern Atlantic coast as far south as France and northern Iberia.

Birds wintering in northern Scotland and southwest Ireland migrate to Canada (Baffin Island and Devon Island) to breed.

In Britain, these birds occur in winter in good numbers principally along the east and south coasts, where they favour rocky shorelines adjacent to the sea. It is much rarer as a breeding bird, found only in a localised area of the Cairngorms National Park, where 1–3 pairs have bred since 1978. Records of breeding by this species in the UK are monitored and archived by the Rare Breeding Birds Panel.

They are late migrants and move to rocky, ice-free Atlantic coasts in winter. Most go no further south than North Carolina and northern Portugal. They are fairly gregarious, forming small flocks, often with ruddy turnstones. This species is tame and approachable.

== Behaviour and ecology ==
=== Breeding ===
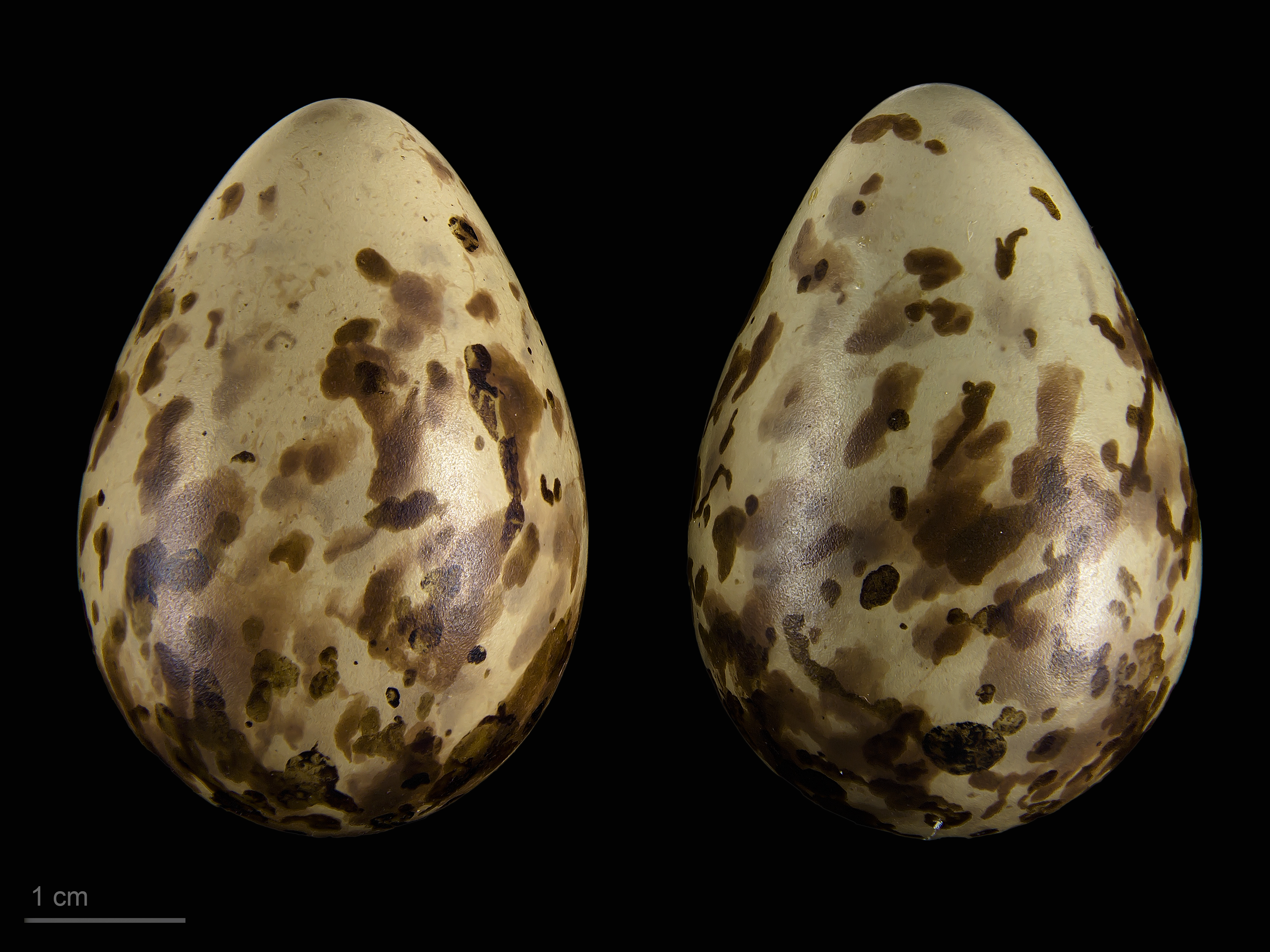
Eggs of C. maritima

Their breeding habitat is the northern tundra on Arctic islands in Canada and coastal areas in Greenland and northwestern Europe. They can breed at one year of age. The male makes several scrapes on the ground; the female chooses one and lays 3 or 4 eggs. These are olive with brown blotches and are approximately 37 mm × 26 mm (1.5 in × 1.0 in) in size. The male takes the major responsibility for incubation of the eggs which hatch in 21–22 days. The chicks are covered with dense down. The upperparts have black and cinnamon patches with white specks; the underparts are mainly white. Usually only the male tends the chicks which can feed themselves. The maximum age recorded from ring-recovery data in Europe is 20 years and 9 months for a bird recovered in Sweden.

An apparent case of hybridisation between this species and the dunlin has been reported from England.

=== Feeding ===
These birds forage on rocky coasts, picking up food by sight. They mainly eat arthropods and molluscs, mainly littorinids and mussels, also some plant material. One of the main staples are seaweed flies of the Coelopa genera (C. frigida).

== Status ==
The purple sandpiper has a large range – 13,600,000 square kilometres (5,300,000 sq mi) – and although the population appears to be decreasing, the population is large (136,000-191,000 mature individuals as of 2024). The International Union for Conservation of Nature (IUCN) has judged that the threat to the species is of "Least concern". The purple sandpiper is one of the species to which the Agreement on the Conservation of African-Eurasian Migratory Waterbirds (AEWA) applies.

== Sources ==
- Cramp, Stanley, ed. (1983). "Calidris maritima Purple Sandpiper". Handbook of the Birds of Europe the Middle East and North Africa. The Birds of the Western Palearctic. Vol. III: Waders to Gulls. Oxford: Oxford University Press. pp. 345–355. ISBN 978-0-19-857506-1.
