= Vicksburg High School (Michigan) =

High school in Vicksburg, Michigan, United States

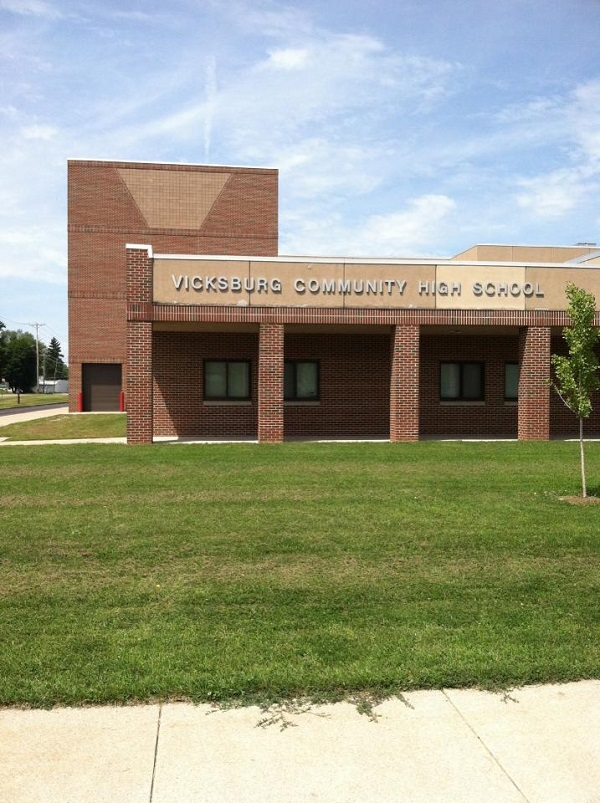

Location
- 501 East Highway Street; Vicksburg, Michigan 49097; United States
- Coordinates: 42°6′52″N 85°31′33″W

Information
- School district: Vicksburg Community Schools
- Superintendent: Keevin O’Neill
- Principal: Adam Brush
- Teaching staff: 39.25 (on an FTE basis)
- Enrollment: 724 (2024-25)
- Student to teacher ratio: 18.45
- Colors: Red; White
- Athletics conference: Wolverine Conference
- Nickname: Bulldogs
- Website: www.vicksburgschools.org/schools/high-school/

Student assessments
- 2021–22 school year Change vs. prior year

M-STEP 11th grade proficiency rates (Science / Social Studies)
- Advanced %: 27.7 / 13.3
- Proficient %: 29.8 / 36.2
- PR. Proficient %: 16.0 / 41.5
- Not Proficient %: 26.6 / 9.0

Average test scores
- SAT Total: 996.1 (▼ −12)

Vicksburg High School is a 9-12 public high school in Vicksburg, Michigan. It is part of the Vicksburg Community Schools.

== Academics ==
In the 2022 U.S. News & World Report public high school rankings, Vicksburg was ranked 108th in the state of Michigan and 3rd in the Kalamazoo area.

== Demographics ==
The demographic breakdown for the 724 students enrolled during the 2024-25 school year was:

- Male - 51.1%
- Female - 48.9%
- Native American/Alaskan - 0.4%
- Asian - 0.9%
- Black - 1.4%
- Hispanic - 4.3%
- Native Hawaiian/Pacific islanders - 0%
- White - 88.3%
- Multiracial - 4.7%

26.7% of the students were eligible for free or reduced-cost lunch.

== Athletics ==
The Vicksburg athletic teams are known as the Bulldogs and the school colors are red and white. The Bulldogs compete in the Wolverine Conference. The following MHSAA sanctioned sports are offered at Vicksburg High School:

- Baseball (boys)
- Basketball (girls & boys)
- Bowling (girls & boys)
- Competitive cheerleading (girls)
- Cross country (girls & boys)
  - Boys state champions - 1963
- Football (boys)
- Golf (girls & boys)
- Lacrosse (boys)
- Soccer (girls & boys)
- Softball (girls)
- Tennis (girls & boys)
  - Boys state champions - 1974
- Track & field (girls & boys)
- Volleyball (girls)
- Wrestling (boys)

In November 1977, The Bulldogs were the subject of a two part story in Sports Illustrated, chronicling the impact of high school football on a small town.
