= Three Rivers Community Schools =

School district in Michigan

Address
- 851 Sixth Avenue Three Rivers, St. Joseph, Michigan, 49093; United States
- Coordinates: 41°56′52″N 85°37′08″W

District information
- Grades: Pre-Kindergarten–12
- Superintendent: Nichole Nash
- Schools: 6
- Budget: $40,691,000 2022-2023 expenditures
- NCES District ID: 2633840

Students and staff
- Students: 2,154 (2024-2025)
- Teachers: 138.83 (on an FTE basis) (2024-2025)
- Staff: 314.87 FTE (2024-2025)
- Student–teacher ratio: 15.52 (2024-2025)

Other information
- Website: www.trschools.org

Three Rivers Community Schools is a public school district in West Michigan. In St. Joseph County, it serves Three Rivers and parts of the townships of Constantine, Fabius, Florence, Flowerfield, Lockport, and Park. It also serves parts of Newberg Township and Calvin Township in Cass County.

== History ==
The first school in Three Rivers was established in 1834 in a log cabin. It was a private school, but in 1837, a tax-funded public school was constructed. It was a plank building of 24x30 feet. It was moved to the public square in 1840. As the town prospered, a brick school was built in 1850 and expanded in 1853. It burned and was rebuilt twice.

During the 19th Century, ward schools were established in different areas of the city. These schools were ungraded, and instead students were put into one of three sections depending on age and ability: Primary, Intermediate, and Grammar. Two of the ward schools had a fourth section: High School, with the First Ward's high school program being four years, and the Second Ward's program being two. A citywide high school was built in 1904 and opened in 1905, and it used the modern four-grade system. As of 1910, there were still four ward schools operating in Three Rivers.

The 1904 high school was built at 207 East Michigan Avenue. A major addition was built in 1921 to house a junior high school. The 1904 section burned down on April 17, 1955. A new wing was built in its place and completed in fall 1957.

As of the 1970-1971 school year, the high school went on half-day sessions due to overcrowding, and a bond issue to build more facilities failed. 1600 students in grades seven through twelve were being taught at the 950-student capacity building. Voters finally approved a bond issue to build a junior high in June 1971. The vote passed by a margin of 49 votes. The building was completed in April 1973.

The current high school opened in fall 1999. Fanning Howey was the architect. The school was dedicated on August 15, 1999. One of the first functions to use the 1,000-seat auditorium, on August 26, 1999, was a seminar called 'Y2K and You.' The former high school was converted into a church center and community building.

== Schools ==
Schools in Three Rivers Community Schools district
School	Address	Notes
Three Rivers High School	700 Sixth Ave., Three Rivers	Grades 9-12. Built 1999.
Three Rivers Middle School	1101 Jefferson Avenue, Three Rivers	Grades 6-8; built 1973
Andrews Elementary	200 S. Douglas, Three Rivers	Grades PreK-5
Norton Elementary	59692 A.L. Jones Road, Three Rivers	Grades K-5
Park Elementary	53806 Wilbur Road, Three Rivers	Grades K-5
Ruth Hoppin Elementary	415 N. Main Street, Three Rivers	Grades K-5
Three Rivers Partnership	1101 Jefferson Street Room 252, Three Rivers	Alternative education, located in Three River Middle School
Three Rivers Adult Education	203 North US 131 Highway, Suite 281, Three Rivers	Adult education
