= Three Rivers Academy =

Location
- 1875 rue Nicolas-Perrot; Trois-Rivières, Quebec, G9A 1C5; Canada
- Coordinates: 46.359872°N 72.548003°W

Information
- School type: Public, High School
- School board: Central Quebec School Board
- Principal: Jonathan Percival
- Grades: Grade 7-11
- Enrollment: 200 (approx)
- Language: English, French
- Campus: Urban
- Colours: Red, Black, Gold
- Team name: Phoenix
- Website: www.cqsb.qc.ca

The Three Rivers Academy is an English-language high school in Trois-Rivières, Quebec, Canada. It was created from the amalgamation of St. Patrick's High School and Three Rivers High School.

Three Rivers Academy is now where St. Patrick's High School used to be, and Mauricie English Elementary School is where Three Rivers High School was.

== Sports and traditions ==
Three Rivers Academy has athletic teams in basketball, flag football, ultimate frisbee, volleyball, badminton, and floorball.

Annual events include a spring festival and MC/MR festivities.

== Curriculum ==
Three Rivers Academy offers an English Secondary program in line with the Québec Educational Program with emphasis on computers, mathematics and the sciences. The school also offers as well a Sports Study Program.

Three Rivers Academy also provides the choice to pick between French Second Language or French Mother Tongue courses.

== Support Services ==
TRA has support services which include special education technicians, career advisors, homework assistance, psycho-educator, psychologist, and a nurse.

More recently, TRA started a 'Homework club' for students who need help with academics.
