= Three Rivers Academy, Surrey =

Three Rivers Academy

Location
- Hersham Road; Hersham, Surrey, KT12 5PY; England; 51.373°N 0.403°W

Information
- Former names: Rydens Enterprise School Rydens School
- Type: Academy
- Motto: Bringing out the best
- Established: 1954 (as Rydens School); 2017 (as Three Rivers Academy)
- Local authority: Surrey County Council
- Trust: The Howard Partnership Trust
- Department for Education URN: 144503 Tables
- Ofsted: Reports
- Principal: B Mayaire
- Staff: Approx. 200
- Gender: Mixed
- Age range: 11 to 18
- Enrolment: Approx. 1,500
- Capacity: 1,800
- Website: www.threeriversacademy.org

Three Rivers Academy is a mixed, secondary school situated on Hersham Road, between Hersham and Walton-on-Thames in Surrey, England. The school has been awarded Specialist Business and Enterprise College status.

== Change from "Rydens School" to "RES" ==
Following an Ofsted inspection in 2009, the school was rated 'Good with Outstanding Features' and became eligible to become a new style Academy. The governors and Head Teacher decided to move forward with the change of status and opted to rename at the same time. The Rydens name remained, but the abbreviation RES became the official name, standing for Rydens Enterprise School. The school opened as RES for the 2011 Autumn term and was officially opened by local MP Dominic Raab.

== Change to Three Rivers Academy ==
In May 2017 it was announced that as of September 2017 the school would be called Three Rivers Academy after the three local rivers - River Thames, River Mole and River Wey.

In February 2018 students moved into a new £40 million building. On 26 June 2018 the new building was officially opened by Maggie Aderin-Pocock.

== Three Rivers Academy Sixth Form College ==
Three Rivers Academy Sixth Form College is the school's sixth form. In the school's 2019 inspection by Ofsted, the report said that "The sixth form is good. Students’ outcomes have improved markedly over time and they are well prepared for their next steps". In 2022, the average A-level result was C, compared to an average of B for both Surrey schools and England as a whole.

== Notable alumni ==
- Jimmy Pursey – punk rock singer
- Chris Rose – wildlife artist
- Luke Shaw – footballer for Manchester United and England
- Rebeka Simon – Olympic sprint canoer
