= Judith Bailey =

Judith Bailey may refer to:

- Judith Bailey (academic) (born 1946), American academic who presided both the Western and Northern Michigan universities
- Judith Bailey (composer) (1941–2025), English composer, conductor and Cornish Bard
- Judith Jones (née Bailey, 1924–2017), American writer and editor known for rescuing The Diary of Anne Frank from a rejection pile
- Judy Bailey (pianist) (born Judith Mary Bailey, 1935–2025), New Zealand-born pianist and jazz musician
- Judith Bailey Perkins, American professor and daughter of politician John Moran Bailey
- Rita May (actress) (born 1942), who played a character named Judith Bailey in a 2005 episode of British medical drama series Bodies

== See also ==
- Bailey (surname)
