= Edward B. Montgomery =

American economist

Ed Montgomery
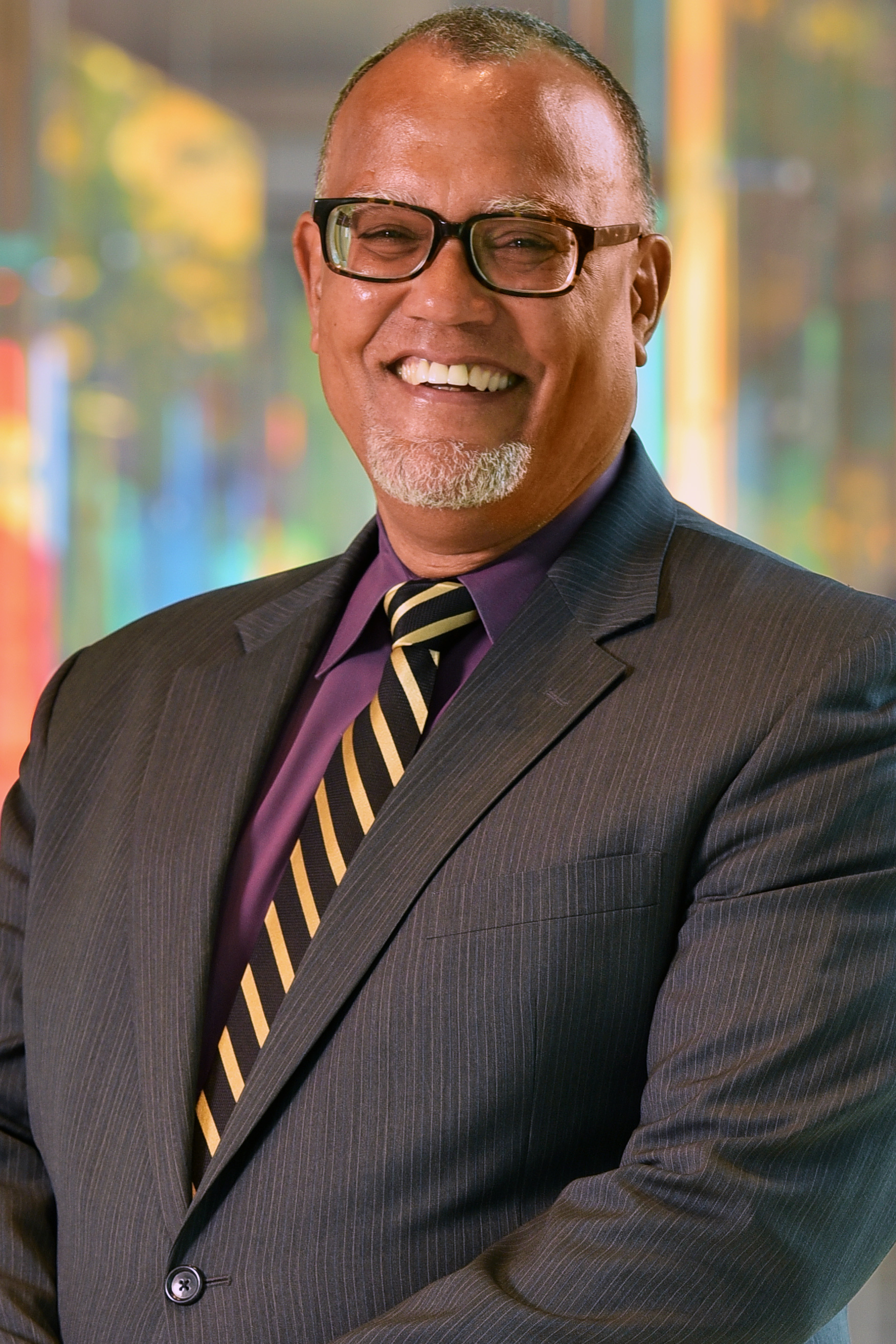

9th President of Western Michigan University
- In office August 1, 2017 – June 30, 2025
- Preceded by: John Dunn
- Succeeded by: Russ Kavalhuna

United States Deputy Secretary of Labor
- In office 2000–2001
- President: Bill Clinton
- Preceded by: Kathryn Higgins
- Succeeded by: D. Cameron Findlay

Personal details
- Born: July 3, 1955 (age 71) Pittsburgh, Pennsylvania, U.S.
- Party: Democratic
- Education: Pennsylvania State University, University Park (BA); Harvard University (MA, PhD)

Edward B. Montgomery (born July 3, 1955) is an American economist, academic, and politician who previously served as the president of Western Michigan University. He is one of the key players in helping pull the United States out of the automotive crisis.

== Biography ==
Montgomery graduated from Taylor Allderdice High School in Pittsburgh, Pennsylvania, in 1973 and was inducted into their alumni hall of fame in 2010. He earned his bachelor's degree magna cum laude from Pennsylvania State University in 1976 and his master's and doctoral degrees in economics from Harvard University in 1980 and 1982, respectively. His doctoral dissertation was titled "Tests of Alternative Hypotheses on the Decline in the Personal Saving Rate".

From 1981 to 1990, Montgomery served as a professor in the Department of Economics at Michigan State University. In 1990, he was appointed at the rank of associate professor in the Department of Economics at the University of Maryland, College Park, where he became a full professor in 1992. From 1997 to 1999 Montgomery served as chief economist of the United States Department of Labor in the administration of President Bill Clinton. From 2000 to 2001, he served as Deputy Secretary of Labor, the second highest position in that department. From 2003 to 2009, he served as dean of the College of Behavioral and Social Sciences at the University of Maryland, College Park.

In late 2008, after the election of Barack Obama as President of the United States, Montgomery led the presidential transition team concerned with the Department of Labor. In February 2009, he was named by Obama to the Presidential Task Force on the Auto Industry. On March 30, 2009, Obama appointed Montgomery as Director of Recovery for Auto Communities and Workers. This position oversees the health of the struggling United States automobile industry as a result of the Automotive industry crisis of 2008–2009.

On August 15, 2010, Montgomery became the Dean of the Georgetown Public Policy Institute at Georgetown University. In 2011, Montgomery was elected as a fellow of the National Academy of Public Administration.

In April 2017, Montgomery was announced as the ninth president of Western Michigan University. He began his tenure as president on August 1, 2017. In his inaugural address, Montgomery echoed an expression used during the era of WMU's second president Paul Sangren, "That All May Learn," and noted the university's commitment to excellence and inclusion. During his first year at WMU, Montgomery has spoken at length on the need for transformational change. His 2017 and 2018 State of the university addresses detail this philosophy and the specific initiatives proposed to meet that goal.

On September 12, 2024, Montgomery announced that he would be retiring as president on June 30, 2025.

Montgomery married in 1994 and has three children. His father was pioneering labor historian David Montgomery.

Government offices
Preceded by Kathryn Higgins	United States Deputy Secretary of Labor; 2000–2001	Succeeded by D. Cameron Findlay
