= Dwight B. Waldo =

President of Western Michigan University

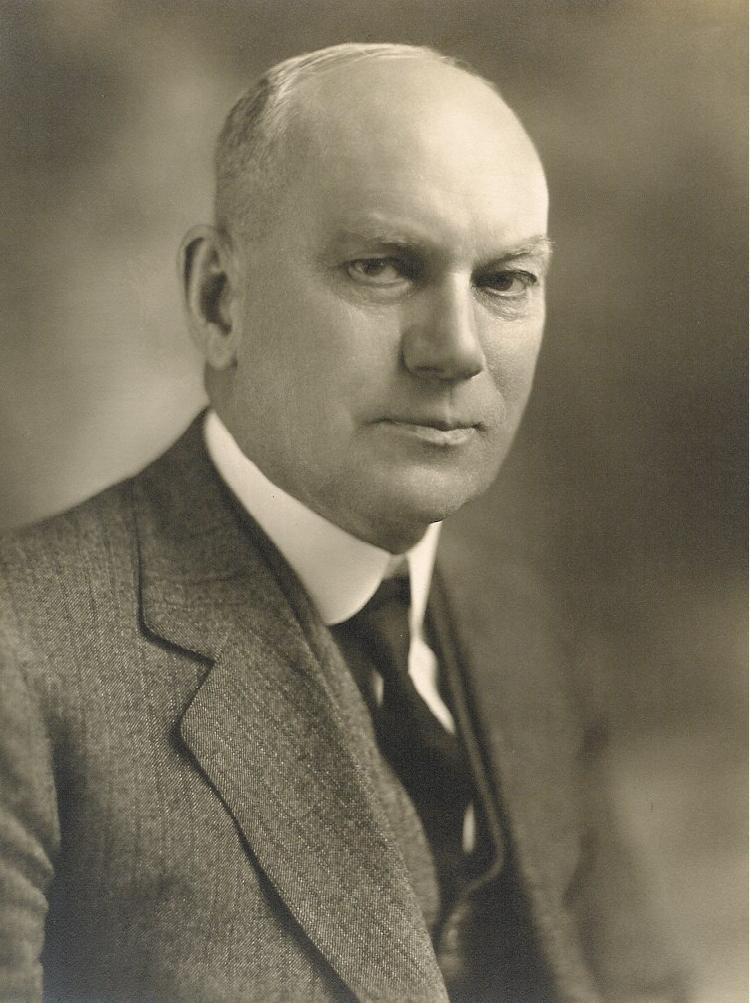
Waldo as president of WMU

Dr. Dwight Bryant Waldo (June 13, 1864 – October 29, 1939) was the first President of Western Michigan University (WMU) in Kalamazoo, Michigan. Waldo was born in Arcade, N.Y. but spent his childhood in Plainwell, Michigan. Waldo was elected principal of WMU on April 1, 1904. He served as president from 1904 through 1936. When Western Michigan first opened, it was known as the Western State Normal School and later as the Western State Teachers College. One of Waldo's first moves, creating a rural school department, cemented WMU as a teaching college. It was the first such department in the nation and prepared teachers to effectively educate students in rural parts of America. Waldo also firmly believed in diversity on campus, and during his tenure many females and minorities were given the opportunity to attend the college.

In the beginning Western Michigan served as a two-year normal school, but under Waldo's guidance it was soon structured into a four-year teachers college. He also served as one of the first instructors at WMU. Waldo is credited with keeping WMU open when many government officials wanted to shut it during the Great Depression. The school's football stadium (Waldo Stadium) and library (Waldo Library) are named in his honor. In 1912, Kalamazoo College awarded Waldo a Doctor of Laws as an honorary degree for his accomplishments at WMU. In 1932, Michigan State University awarded Waldo an honorary Doctor of Letters.

Waldo was born in Arcade, New York, son of Simeon Smith Waldo and Martha Ann Bryant Waldo, during the final year of the Civil War. He and his family moved to Plainwell, Michigan in about 1874. Waldo graduated from Plainwell High School and went on to attend Michigan State Agricultural College (now Michigan State University) and receive an MA from Albion College. He married first Minnie Strong (children: Herbert (born 1894) and Ruth (born 1895)) and after Minnie's death, he married Eliza Lilian Trudgeon on September 14, 1904 (children: Elizabeth (born 1908), Barbara (born 1911) and Dorothy (born 1919)).

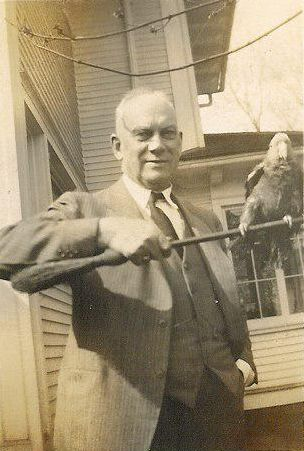
Waldo and "Jimmy Boy"

Waldo was noted for his interest and research into the life of Abraham Lincoln. His personal collection of Lincoln memorabilia is one of many displays at Waldo Library. A WMU librarian and Dwight Waldo Historian stated, "Waldo's vision, 'tough love' leadership style and unique combination of pragmatism and idealism are legendary around campus and Kalamazoo". Waldo had a pet parrot named "Jimmy Boy." Despite claims that he walked around campus with the parrot, there is no evidence of this.

Prior to assuming his leadership role at Western Michigan, Waldo was the first principal at Northern State Normal School (now Northern Michigan University) where he served from 1899 to 1904, and additionally served as the Department Chair of the History Department. 100 years after Waldo came to Western Michigan another Northern Michigan president, Judith Bailey, would follow in his footsteps to help Western Michigan kick off its "Centennial Campaign" after arriving in 2003. Waldo was also a history and economics teacher at Albion College before becoming principal at Northern State.
