= Western State Normal Railroad =

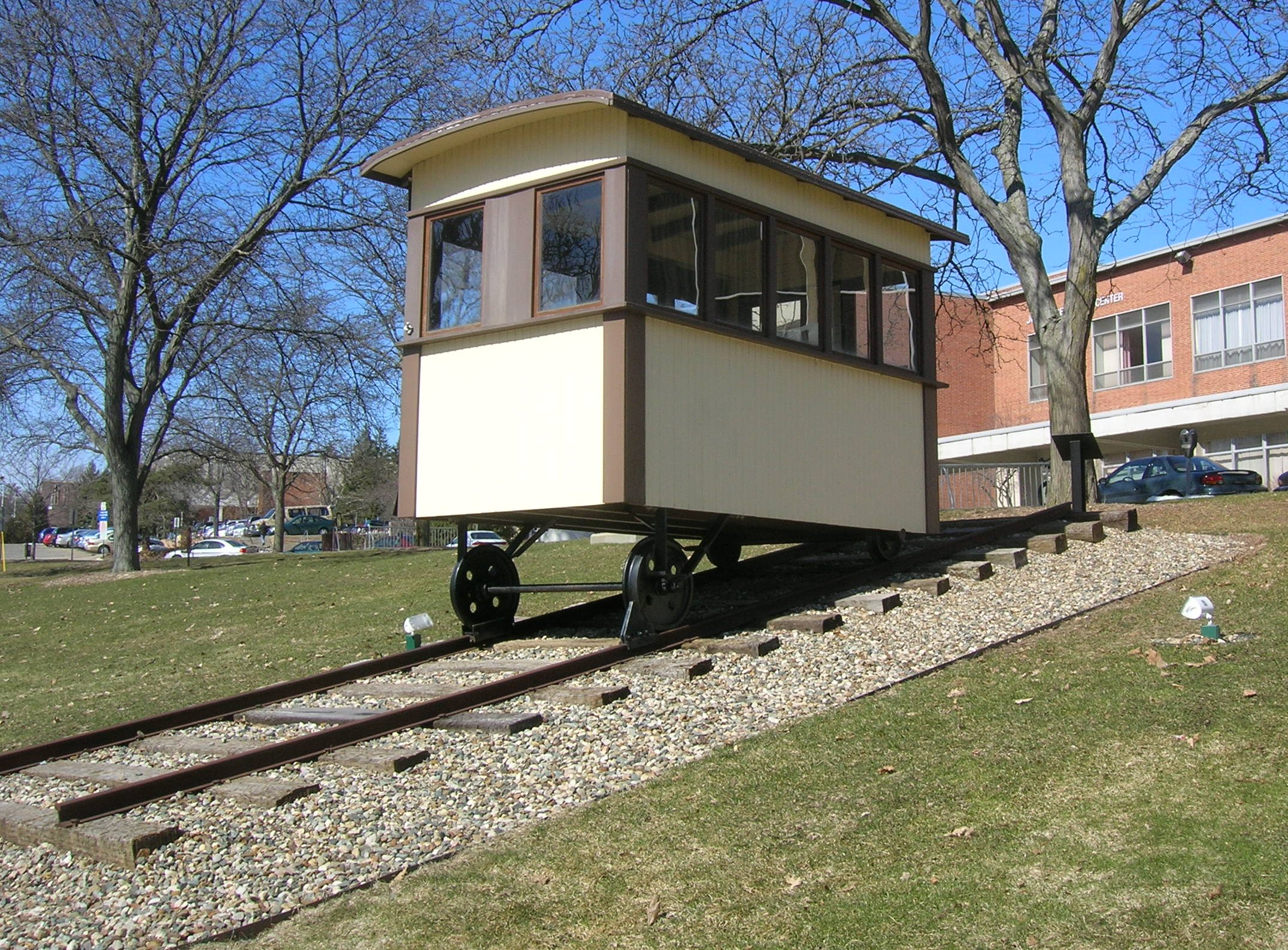
The replica car, which sits on College Circle near Floyd Hall on WMU's Parkview Campus

The Western State Normal Railroad, also known as the Normal Railroad or Western Trolley, was a funicular which operated on the campus of Western Michigan University in Kalamazoo, Michigan, in the United States from 1908–1949. It is the only known example of a private railroad operated by a university.

== Operation and decline ==
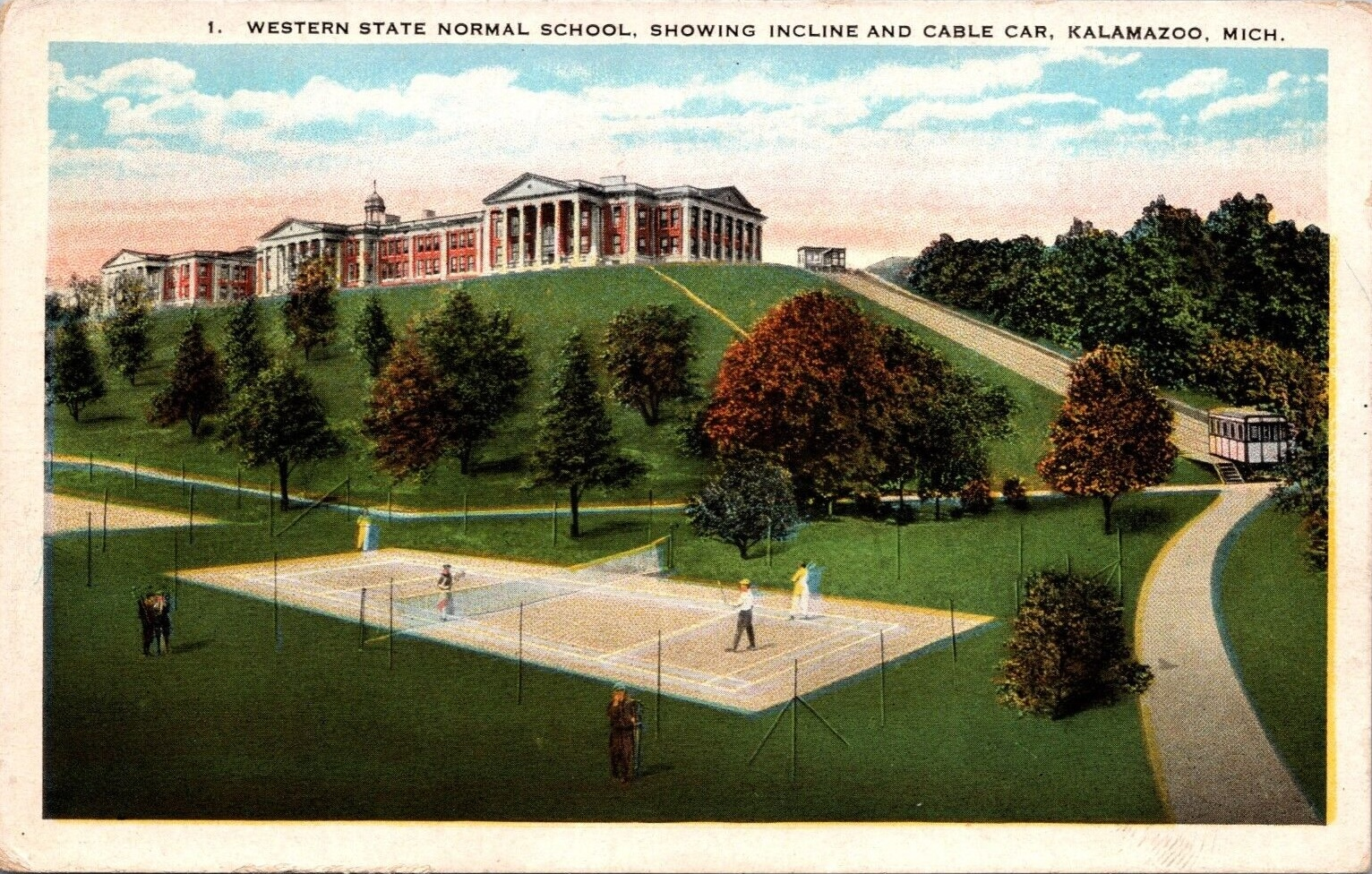
Undated postcard of the incline, circa 1910s-1920s

In the early 1900s the primary campus of Western Michigan University, then known as Western State Normal School, was located on Prospect Hill (this area is now known as East Campus). To reach the buildings students and faculty faced a forbidding 105 step-climb, often in inclement weather. In an effort to address this problem, the school constructed a funicular along the northeast corner of the hill. The base of the line was at Davis Street, while the summit lay between East Hall and North Hall. There were two tracks, each with a cable-hauled car.

At its peak the railroad carried 2,280 passengers daily, but rising maintenance costs combined with the growing usage of the automobile hastened its demise, and it carried its last passenger in 1949.

== Restoration ==
In 2002 four senior engineering majors at WMU embarked on a project to build a replica of one of the trolleys. This proved no easy task: following the closure of the railroad in 1949, no effort was made to preserve the cars. The only physical remnant was a bench saved by a faculty member; while there were sketches and photographs for reference, no actual blueprints had survived. Commenting on the situation a WMU official remarked that "back then was a period in history so intent on the future, that everyone started forgetting about the past."

Despite these challenges, the students successfully completed their project, which was unveiled April 8, 2003, and currently occupies a place near Floyd Hall on Western's Parkview campus. Local residents and Western alumni who had ridden the trolley testified to the authenticity of the restoration.

== See also ==
- East Campus, where the trolley operated.
- List of funicular railways
