= John Dunn (university president) =

American academic (born 1945)

John M. Dunn
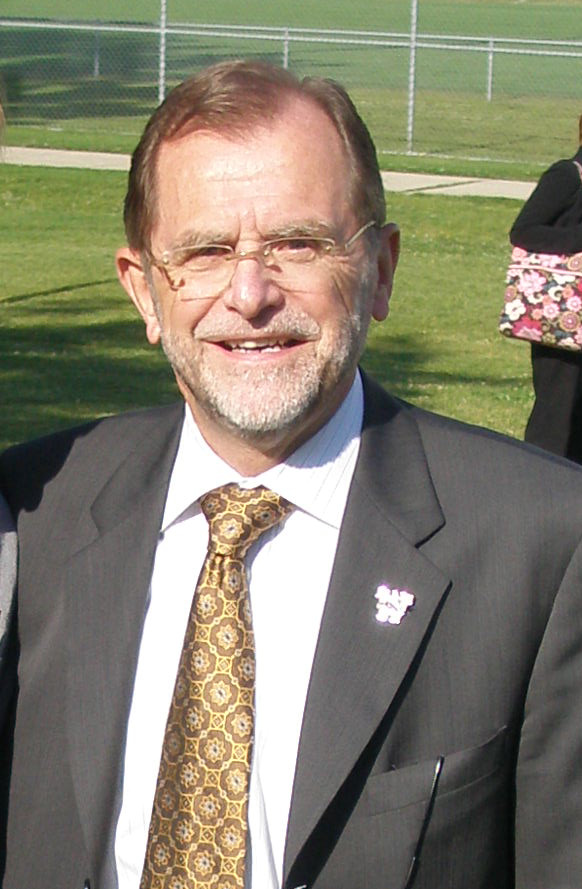

8th President of Western Michigan University
- In office 2007–2017
- Preceded by: Diether Haenicke
- Succeeded by: Edward B. Montgomery

Personal details
- Born: October 3, 1945 (age 81) Pinckneyville, Illinois
- Spouse: Linda Dunn
- Children: 3
- Education: Northern Illinois University, Brigham Young University
- Salary: $398,200

John M. Dunn (born October 3, 1945) was the eighth president of Western Michigan University. Dunn earned his bachelor's and master's degrees from Northern Illinois University, and he earned an Ed.D. in physical education from Brigham Young University.

He began his career in higher education at the University of Connecticut in 1972. He moved to Oregon State University in 1975 and spent the next 20 years there, starting out as an assistant professor of health. He was a professor and associate provost at the time he left in 1995. During his time in Oregon, Dunn also served on the Corvallis School Board for 13 years.

Dunn served as the dean of the College of Health at the University of Utah from 1995 to 2002. He next served as provost and vice chancellor and then interim chancellor at Southern Illinois University.

Dunn began his term as president of Western Michigan University on July 1, 2007. Each year he donated his salary increase over his initial $345,000 salary in 2007 to scholarships for WMU students.
