= Waldo Stadium =

Sports stadium in Kalamazoo, Michigan

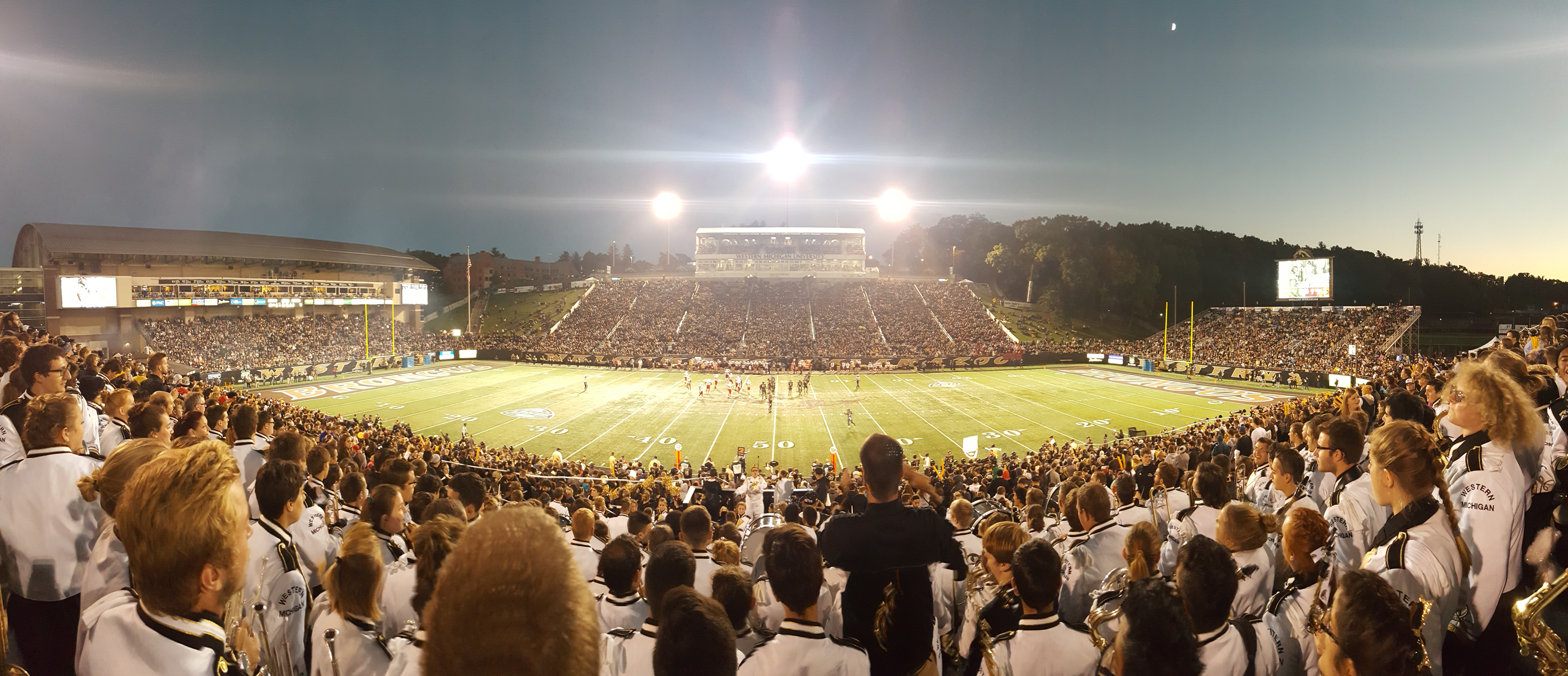
- Panorama of Waldo Stadium, October 8, 2016

- Location in Michigan Location in the United States
- Former names: Western State Teachers College Field
- Location: 1903 West Michigan Avenue; Kalamazoo, Michigan 49008
- Coordinates: 42°17′9″N 85°36′4″W
- Owner: Western Michigan University
- Operator: Western Michigan University
- Capacity: 30,200 (1989–present); 25,000 (1973–1988); 15,000 (1939–1972)
- Surface: FieldTurf (2006–present); NexTurf (2000–2005); Prescription Athletic Turf (1992–1999); Astroturf (1974–1991); Natural grass (1939–1973)
- Record attendance: 36,361 (September 16, 2000 vs. Indiana State)

Construction
- Groundbreaking: 1938
- Opened: October 7, 1939
- Renovated: 1995, 2003, 2013, 2014, 2015
- Expanded: 1973, 1989
- Cost: US$250,000 ($5.79 million in 2025 dollars); US$5.6 million (2013–2015 renovation)

Tenant
- Western Michigan Broncos (NCAA) (1939–present)

Waldo Stadium is a stadium in Kalamazoo, Michigan. It is primarily used for football, and has been the home of Western Michigan University Broncos football in rudimentary form since 1914, and as a complete stadium since 1939. It currently has a seating capacity of 30,200 spectators.

== History ==
The stadium was built at a cost of $250,000 ($4.3 million in 2016), and it opened in 1939 with a 6–0 win over Miami University. The cost for Waldo Stadium also included the construction of Hyames Field, the school's baseball stadium directly west of the football field. The stadium is named for Dwight B. Waldo, first president of the school.

The location of Waldo Stadium has been home for Western football since 1914. A field, without a stadium or modern seating, existed through 1938, until the construction and completion of the stadium in 1939. It originally included an eight-lane track, which has since moved to Kanley Track across Stadium Drive. Financing came through private donations, and those who donated were awarded tickets to the inaugural game against Western Kentucky University. Over the years, WMU continued adding seating to the stadium. In 1973 the capacity was increased to 25,000, and AstroTurf replaced the natural grass field. A renovation in 1989 pushed the available seats to 30,200. In 1993 permanent lighting was added, and in 1995 the university added 325 club seats to the press box. In 1998 the Bill Brown Alumni Football Center was completed, which created new offices for staff, suites, and upgraded facilities for the team.

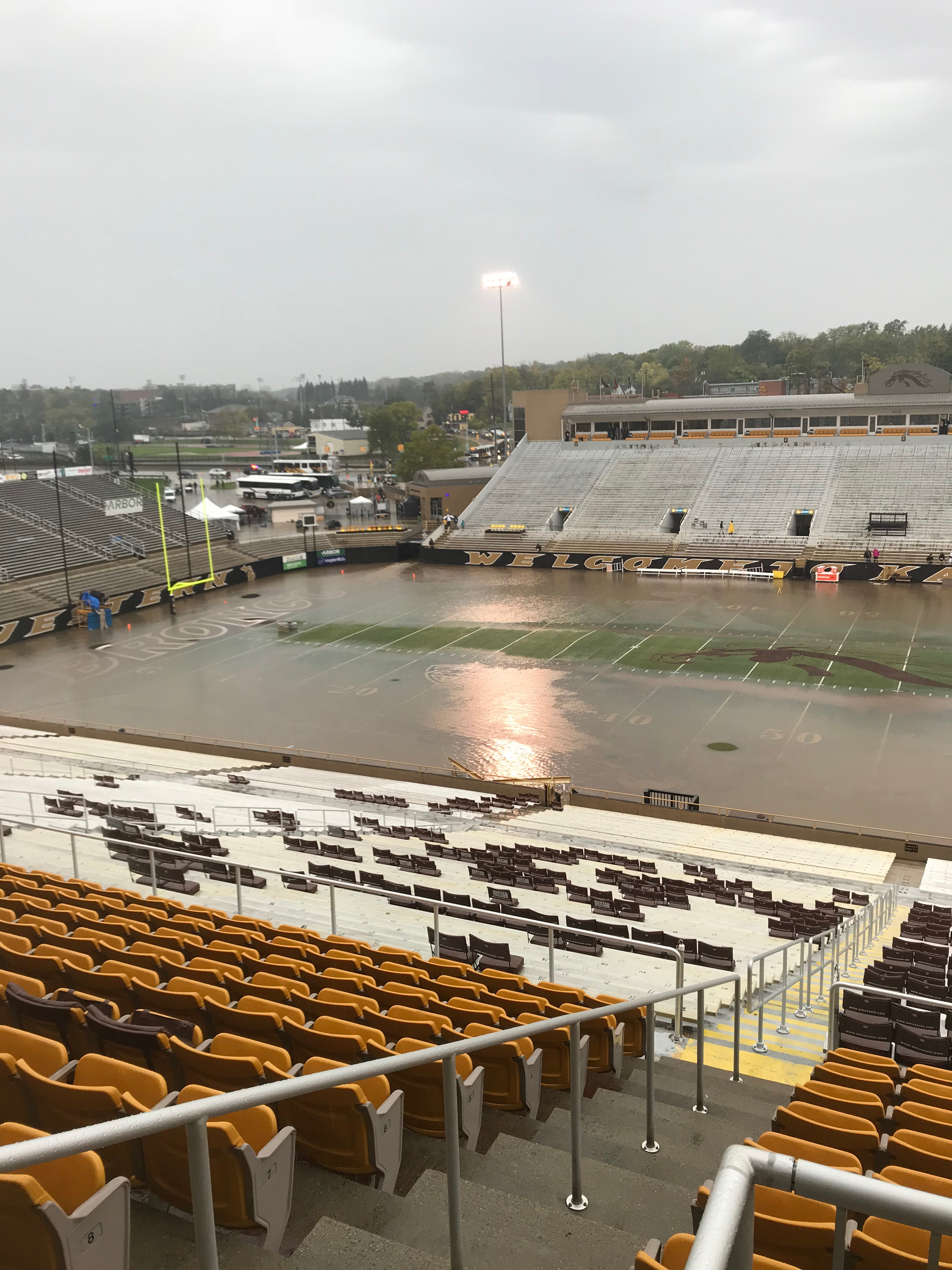
Flooding in Waldo Stadium on October 14, 2017. With the lowest elevation in Kalamazoo, runoff from Stadium Drive and the surrounding area flowed down through the tunnels onto the field. Note the water flow out of the visitors' tunnel on the opposite side of the field between two end zone pylons.

In 2013, the athletic department made almost $3.5 million in renovations and upgrades to Waldo Stadium and Seelye Center, the football team's indoor practice facility. Included in the upgrades were: new artificial turf for stadium, new brown and gold turf for the indoor practice facility, a revamped and upgraded weight room, a remodeled locker room, renovated meeting rooms, and a new team lounge and showplace. Additional renovations were made to the stadium complex from 2014 to 2015 including new speakers for the stadium, new scoreboards and video boards bringing renovation costs to $5.7 million since 2013. A $2 million donation for the project was made by 1988 WMU alum Alec Gores.

On October 14, 2017, the Bronco football team was slated to play Akron for homecoming, when rains from a fall storm combined with drainage system failures flooded the field and postponed the game. Also contributing to the flood, Waldo Stadium is considered the lowest point in the city of Kalamazoo. The game was played at 1pm the next day (A possible Sunday first for Waldo Stadium), and the Broncos were defeated by Akron 14–13. It was reported that over 1 million gallons of water were pumped off the field overnight to prepare the field for the Sunday game.

A renovation to the Stadium Club was completed in September 2024, updating the John Gill Pressbox, which was built in 1995. The $3.6 million renovation included the President's Suite and was funded by the WMU Foundation.

It was announced on October 9, 2024, that Waldo Stadium's field would be named Stafford–Smith Field after David & Ronda Stafford and family donated $5 million to the football program, which represents the largest naming contribution in the history of WMU athletics.

== Seelye Center ==
In 2003, the stadium took on a new look with the completion of the $25 million Donald J. Seelye Center, built by a local construction company, Kalleward Group. The Seelye Center rises eight stories and houses an indoor practice field, weight and fitness rooms, and staff offices. It is located on the edge of the northeast endzone, allowing the Seelye club suites to get a view of the game. The Seelye Center incorporated the existing Oakland Gymnasium into the structure, allowing for a very modern entrance on one side, and a retro style on the other.

== Home field records ==
WMU Bronco Football Waldo Stadium Records Since 2000

Year	Win	Loss	Avg. attendance
2000	5	0	25,043
2001	4	1	26,321
2002	2	4	16,999
2003	3	3	19,136
2004	1	4	15,997
2005	5	1	18,906
2006	5	0	18,625
2007	2	4	19,494
2008	5	0	19,683
2009	3	2	20,330
2010	3	3	14,678
2011	5	0	19,985
2012	3	3	14,579
2013	0	5	17,347
2014	3	2	15,625
2015	4	2	19,441
2016	6	0	23,838
2017	4	2	15,886
2018	3	3	18,293
2019	6	0	17,937
2020	2	1	COVID-19 restricted season
2021	4	2	13,690
2022	2	4	15,260
2023	3	2	17,618
2024	4	1	17,626
2025	5	1	20,194
2026	1	1	27,153 (through 2 games)
Total	90	50	18,834

== High school football ==
In 1975, Waldo Stadium was one of the hosts for the inaugural MHSAA Football State Championship in Class A and Class D. Livonia Franklin beat Traverse City (now Traverse City Central) 21–7 in the Class A title game while Crystal Falls Forest Park defeated Flint Holy Rosary 50–0 in the Class D title game. The finals for all classes were moved to the newly constructed Pontiac Silverdome beginning with the 1976 title games.

In May 2010, the Kalamazoo Valley Association (a local high school athletic conference) announced that it would be playing an inaugural Kalamazoo Valley Association Football Classic at the stadium.

== See also ==
- List of NCAA Division I FBS football stadiums
