= Russ Kavalhuna =

Academic administrator

10th President of Western Michigan University
- Incumbent
- Assumed office 2025
- Preceded by: Edward B. Montgomery

Personal details
- Born: Kalamazoo, Michigan, U.S.
- Education: Western Michigan University (BS); Cooley Law School (JD)

Russell A. “Russ” Kavalhuna is the tenth president of Western Michigan University in Kalamazoo, Michigan and former president of Henry Ford College. Kavalhuna earned his bachelor's degree in flight science from Western Michigan University and his J.D. from Cooley Law School. Prior to higher education administration, Kavalhuna was a federal prosecutor and a commercial airline captain.

Kavalhuna served as the executive director of Flight Operations in the College of Aviation at Western Michigan University from 2015 to 2018. He next served as the sixth president of Henry Ford College in Dearborn, Michigan.

Kavalhuna began his term as president of Western Michigan University on July 1, 2025. In June 2026, the WMU Board of Trustees extended his contract for eight years.
