= Diether Haenicke =

Diether H. Haenicke

5th President of Western Michigan University
- In office 1985–1998
- Preceded by: John T. Bernhard
- Succeeded by: Elson Floyd

Personal details
- Born: May 19, 1935
- Died: February 15, 2009 (aged 73) Kalamazoo, Michigan
- Education: LMU Munich

Diether H. Haenicke

Interim President of Western Michigan University
- In office 2006–2007
- Preceded by: Judith Bailey
- Succeeded by: John Dunn

Diether H. Haenicke (19 May 1935 – 15 February 2009) served as president of Western Michigan University in Kalamazoo, Michigan from 1985 to 1998, and again (as interim president) from 2006 to 2007. A large campus building, Haenicke Hall, is named in his honor.

In 1962, Haenicke received his doctorate, magna cum laude, from LMU Munich.

He stepped down from the presidency in 1998, but continued teaching foreign languages until 2004.

On August 15, 2006, the Western Michigan University Board of Trustees voted to dismiss then-president Judith Bailey, and unanimously appointed Haenicke as interim president. He served his role from September 2006 until July 2007, when John Dunn assumed the presidency.

In December 2008, while giving a speech, Haenicke went into cardiac arrest and sustained a head injury. He died on February 15, 2009, in Kalamazoo, from resulting complications.

== Appearance on Home Improvement ==
In 1995, Haenicke made a cameo appearance in one episode of the sitcom Home Improvement, starring Tim Allen who is a 1976 graduate of WMU. In that episode, Haenicke played himself, and presented Allen's character, Tim "The Tool Man" Taylor, with an honorary doctorate.

The Home Improvement episode would prove to be prophetic, for Allen would actually later be awarded an honorary doctor of fine arts degree by WMU in 1998. However, Haenicke did not present Allen's degree this time, because he would also receive his own honorary degree during the same ceremony.
