= East Campus (Western Michigan University) =

Site of the original campus of Western Michigan University

Coordinates: 42.286643°N 85.597531°W

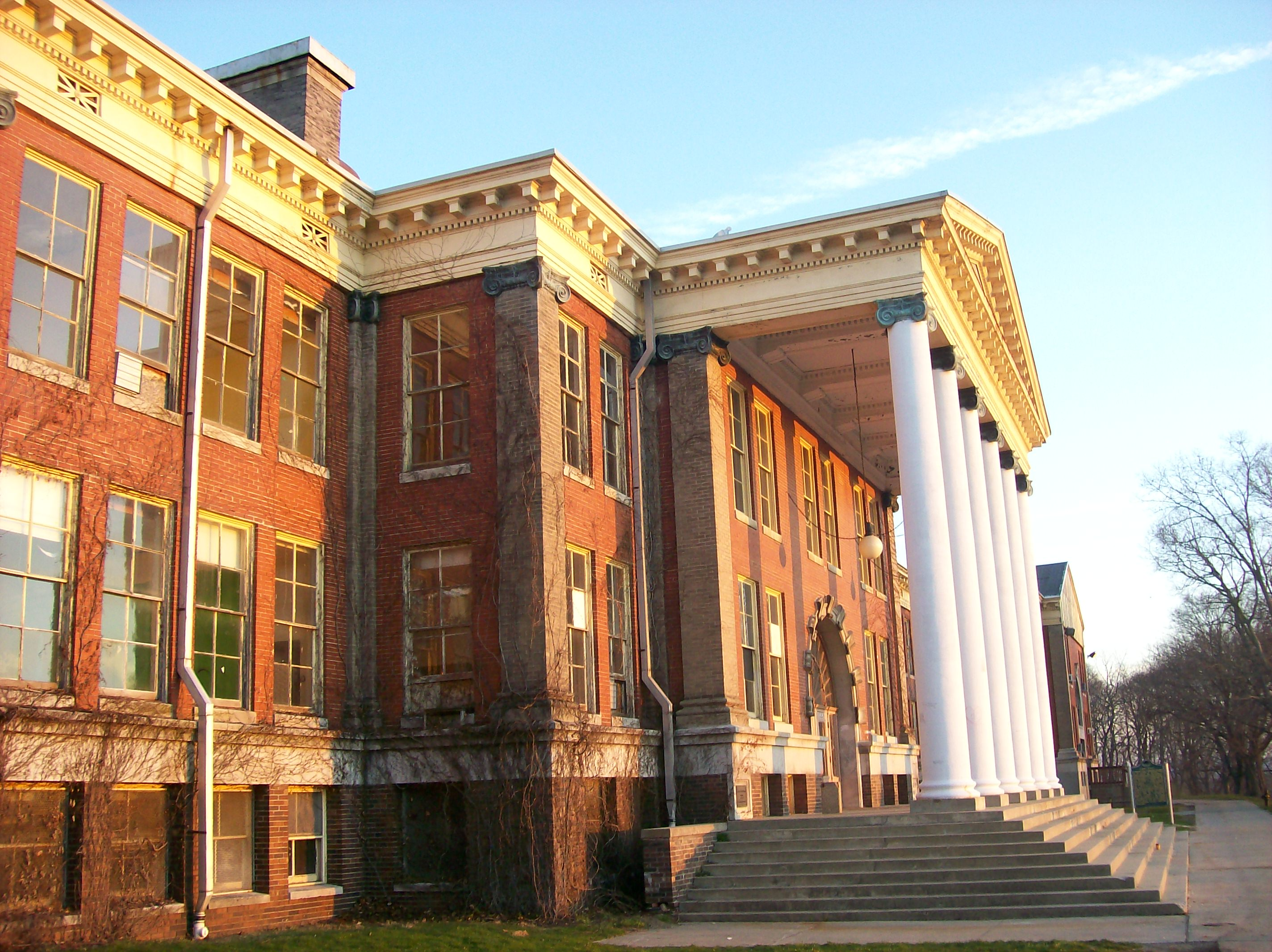
East Hall

East Campus is a collection of buildings and facilities situated on the 60-acre (240,000 m^{2}) hilltop campus that is the original site of Western Michigan University. It includes some of WMU's athletic facilities including Waldo Stadium, Hyames Field, Ebert Field and the Donald Seelye Athletic Center. The campus sits on the top of Prospect Hill, which overlooks the city of Kalamazoo, Michigan.

Most of the academic and administrative functions of the university have moved to West Campus. Walwood Union was renovated in 1992 and converted into administrative offices. WMU has found limited uses for East Hall and the rest of historic East Campus.

== History ==
The original tract of land on which the Western State Normal School was built was donated by the City of Kalamazoo. It consisted of 20 acres (81,000 m^{2}) on Prospect Hill, overlooking the city, accessible either by walking up from Davis Street on the east or via Asylum Road (now known as Oakland Drive).

The first building, the Administration Building (East Hall), was completed and occupied on September 1, 1905. John Charles Olmsted of the renowned Olmsted Brothers landscape firm had devised a landscape and planting plan for the new campus. The plan was well received, but financial considerations prevented it from being implemented. By 1909 two wings had been added to the first building.

Further buildings were erected on the Prospect Hill until the university began to construct its West Campus in the late 1940s. Many aspects of East Campus were left "as is" during the move to the West Campus, with many undesirable items simply left behind. This includes anything from old announcements and bulletins left hanging on the walls to old audio/visual equipment. The 1970 campus plan's only defined plan for East Campus was for the maintenance and athletics facilities along Stadium Drive and for "park areas" along Davis Street.

Some of the space was used by university's Art Department for studio use and occasional faculty office space. East Hall housed the Western Michigan University Archives in the old school gymnasium. There was little to no renovation to the original gym, as the original floor was intact, along with fitness ropes that hung from the ceiling.

East Hall was listed with the National Register of Historic Places in 1978, and the East Campus was placed on the register in 1990 as the Western State Normal School Historic District. Both of these historic places were delisted by NRHP on March 7, 2017.

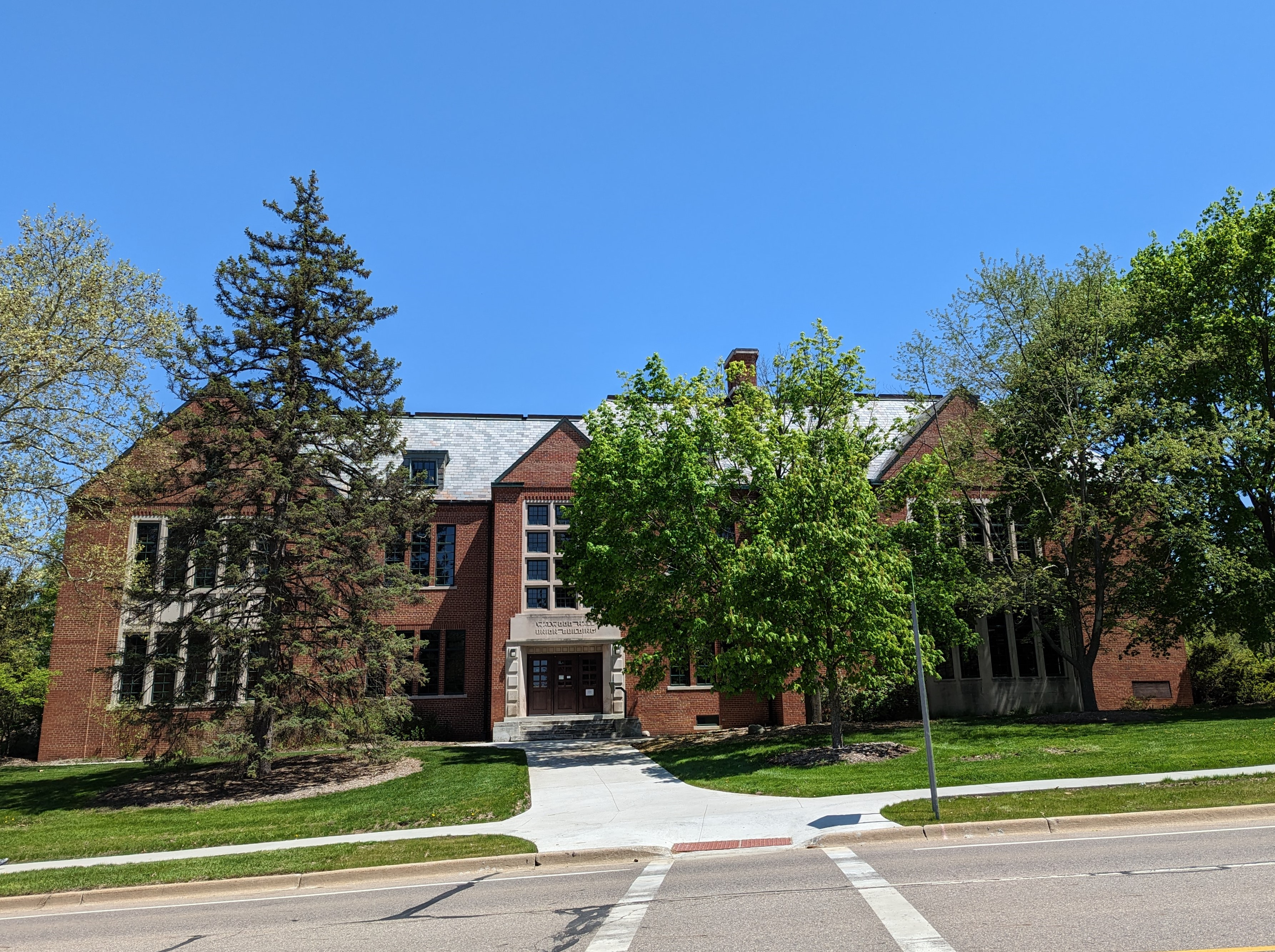
Walwood Hall

Walwood Hall, built in 1938 and originally used as a student union and the first dormitory. It is home to the Graduate College, the Medieval Institute, the WMU Office of Research and Innovation, the Southwest Michigan Small Business Development Center, and several other academic and administrative offices.

With the construction of the Richmond Center for the Visual Arts in 2008, artist's studios were no longer located in East Hall, leaving only the University's archives collection located in East Hall until moving to the new Charles C. and Lynn L. Zhang Legacy Collections Center in 2013.

In December 2012, WMU announced plans to demolish several of the historic buildings in Summer 2013. The north and south wings of East Hall would be demolished, with the remaining structure to be remodeled into what would become the alumni center, Heritage Hall. West Hall, the Speech and Hearing Building, and all but the facade of North Hall would be demolished. Green space areas and a new parking lot would replace the razed buildings.

The Friends of Historical East Campus and Students For East Campus attempted to save the original buildings on Prospect Hill which were not used to capacity and required renovations suitable for the next projected use of the buildings. This site on Prospect Hill is an historically significant site to the City of Kalamazoo as well as a well placed landmark visible from many parts of the city. Neglect of vegetation near the apex of Prospect Hill obscured the view of the historic buildings.

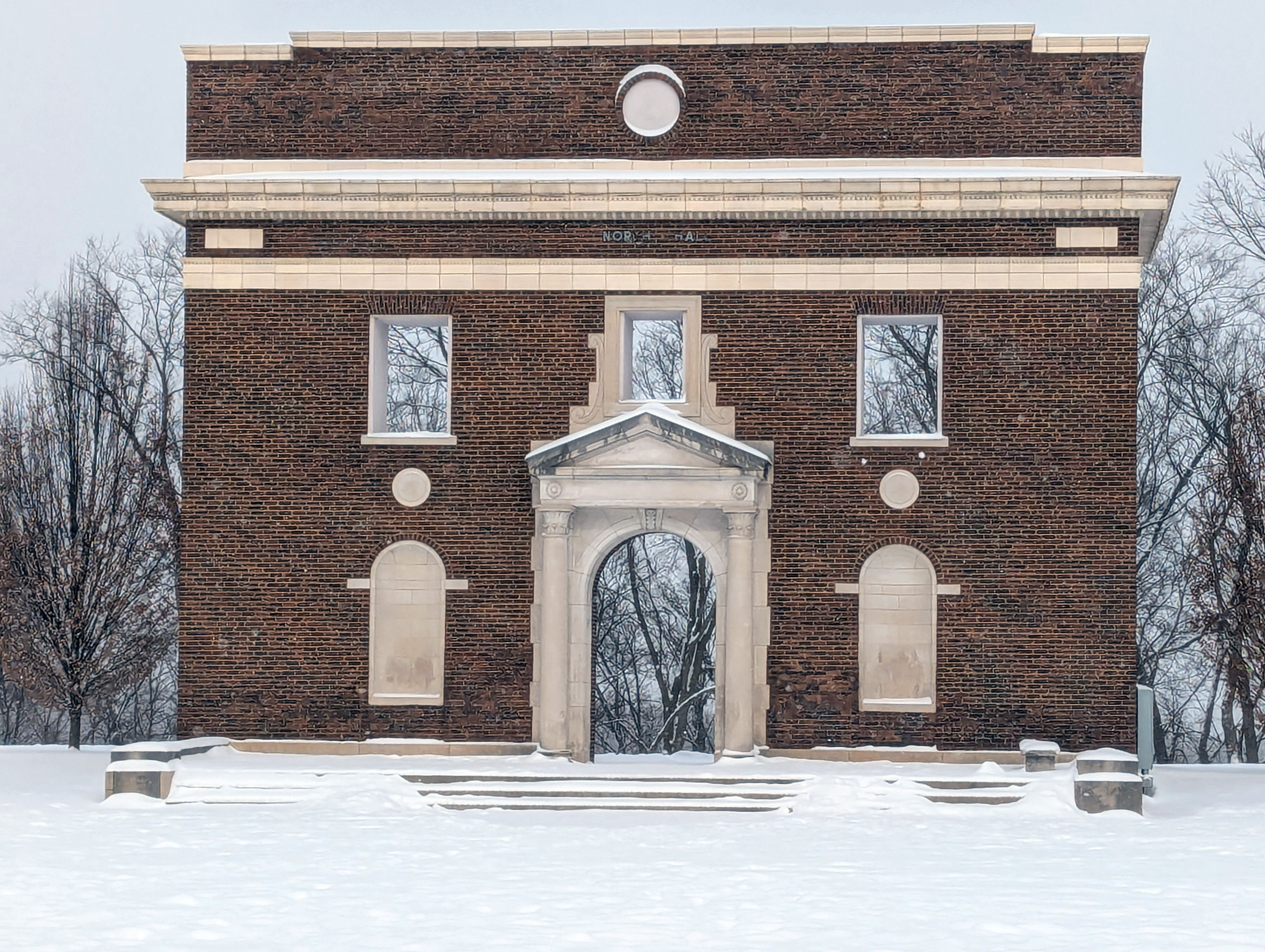
North Hall's facade

In August 2013 West Hall and the Speech and Hearing building on WMU's East Campus were demolished. The original portion of East Hall was retained, but North Hall and the two side wings of East Hall came down. East Hall reopened in 2015 as Heritage Hall, home to the WMU Alumni Center. In addition to the renovation of East Hall, the portico of North Hall was preserved and positioned just north of East Hall.

== Buildings ==
The campus currently includes the following buildings and facilities (erection date in parentheses):

- East Hall (1904) - Partially Demolished
- Walwood Union (1938)
- Waldo Stadium (1939)
- Hyames Field (1939)
- Spindler Hall (1940)
- Oakland Recital Hall (1942)
- Ebert Field (1979)
- Donald Seelye Athletic Center (2003)

Former buildings and facilities:

- West Hall (1915-2014)
- North Hall (1925-2014)
- Oakland Gymnasium (1925-2001)
- Speech and Hearing Building (1939-2014)
- Mechanical Trades Building (1941-2002)
- Vandercook Hall (1940-2025)

== Western Trolley ==
From the beginning, access to the Prospect Hill site was an issue because of the steep grade elevating it above the city. In 1907, funds were appropriated for an electric railway. "Normal's Railroad", or the "Western Trolley", carried people up and down the hill from its base on Davis Street to the summit at the grassy lawn between East and North Halls. It operated until 1949, by which time the campus was moving in new directions and the automobile was making inroads as the preferred method of travel.
