= Oakland Drive Campus =

Campus of Western Michigan University

Coordinates: 42°16′51″N 85°36′11″W

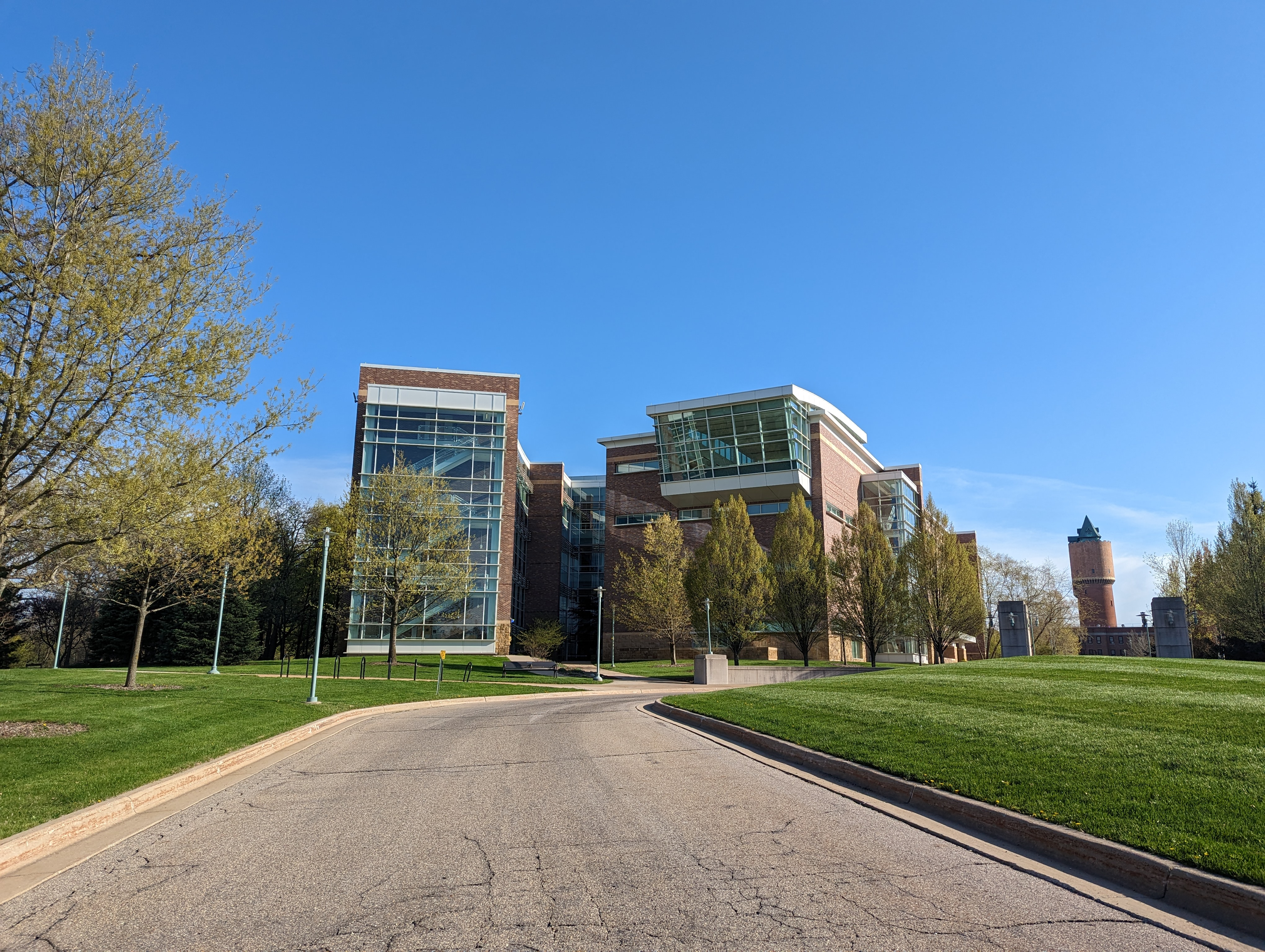
Western Michigan University's Oakland Campus and College of Health and Human Services

Oakland Drive Campus is a campus of Western Michigan University. It is the university's newest land acquisition. The campus, acquired in 1998, was originally state property used by the Kalamazoo Regional Psychiatric Hospital. The hospital is still leased to the state and remains in operation, although in a more limited role. Geographically, it is generally located between West Campus and East Campus, allowing for a natural accessibility. A focal point of the area is the Kalamazoo State Hospital Water Tower. Completed in 1895, this 175 feet (53 m) tall gothic-style construction can be seen from many areas on campus and in town. The newer Oakland Drive Campus buildings are located on Oakland Drive, north of the hospital and water tower.

== College of Health and Human Services ==
The Oakland Drive Campus is home to the university's College of Health and Human Services. The college's new $48.2 million facility opened in 2005, with a total building space of 195,000 square feet (18,100 m^{2}). An interesting design feature is the "winter garden", a 3-level open atrium and commons area with floor to ceiling transparent windows. This feature has become popular in northern climates, as featured in the renovated Renaissance Center in Detroit and the Chrysler Headquarters in Auburn Hills, Michigan.

== WMU Army ROTC ==
The Oakland Drive Campus is also home to the WMU Army ROTC program. This program was recently named the best large program and the best program overall in the 9th Brigade. The 9th Brigade covers all Army Reserve Officer Training Corps programs in Michigan, Indiana, Wisconsin and the northern part of Illinois. WMU Army ROTC was also selected by the United States Army Cadet Command as the winner of the Order of the Founders and Patriots of America award for the Western ROTC Region. This award is only one of three awarded nationwide.

== Zhang Legacy Collections Center ==
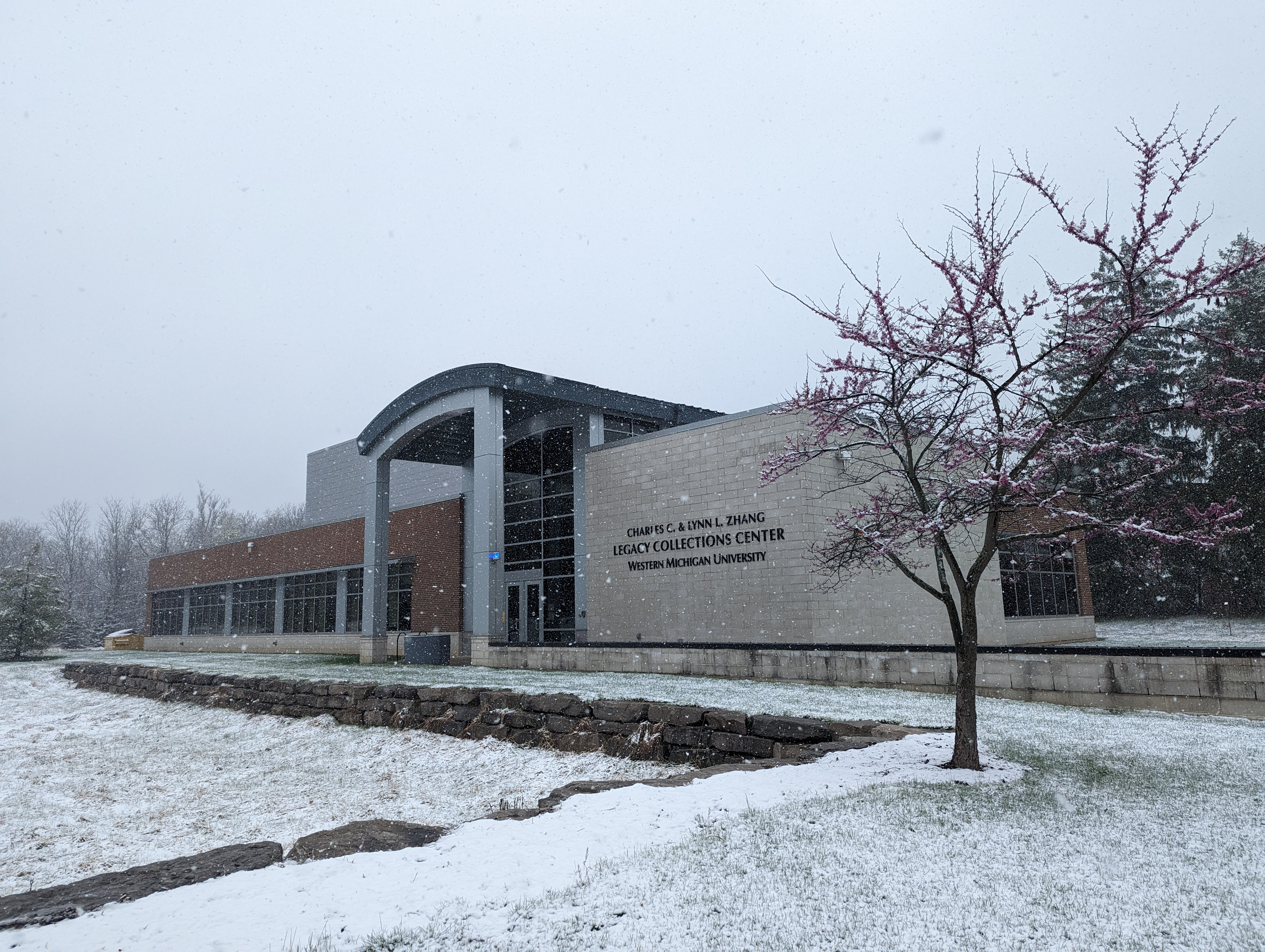
Zhang Legacy Collections Center

Opened in October 2013, the Charles C. and Lynn L. Zhang Legacy Collections Center houses the Western Michigan University Archives and Regional History Collections. Collections consist of historical University, regional, and local governmental records. The holdings total over 28,000 cubic feet, making the WMU Archives the largest facility of its type in southwestern Michigan and one of the largest in the state.

In the fall of 2021 the University Libraries announced that they would be moving their special collections from Waldo Library to the Zhang Center.
