= Elson Floyd =

American academic

Elson S. Floyd
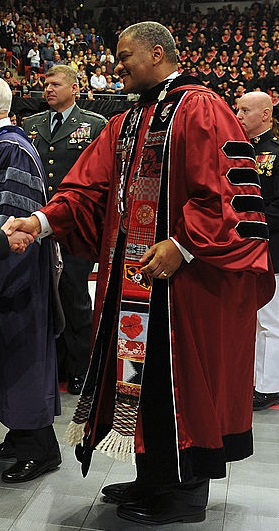

10th President of Washington State University
- In office May 21, 2007 – June 20, 2015
- Preceded by: V. Lane Rawlins
- Succeeded by: Kirk Schulz

6th President of Western Michigan University
- In office 1998–2003
- Preceded by: Diether Haenicke
- Succeeded by: Judith Bailey

Personal details
- Born: February 29, 1956 Henderson, North Carolina
- Died: June 20, 2015 (aged 59) Pullman, Washington
- Cause of death: Colon cancer
- Spouse: Carmento Floyd
- Education: University of North Carolina
- Profession: University president

Elson S. Floyd (February 29, 1956 – June 20, 2015) was an American educator who served as the 10th president of the four-campus Washington State University from May 21, 2007 to June 20, 2015. Floyd was also the first African American to be named president of Washington State University. Floyd also served as president of the University of Missouri System and president of Western Michigan University. Floyd was the Chairman of the Pac-12 CEO Group.

Floyd's tenure at WSU was widely acclaimed within the state of Washington for leading WSU in a $1 billion capital campaign and securing bi-partisan approval of a new WSU medical school in Spokane.

== Early life and education ==
Floyd was born in 1956 in Henderson, North Carolina, a city located about 40 minutes north of Raleigh, the state capital.

== Career ==
Buttons worn by Missouri students in 2005

Floyd started his career in 1978 at the University of North Carolina, Chapel Hill, where he held deanships in the Division of Student Affairs, the General College and the College of Arts and Sciences. From 1988-90, he was assistant vice president for student services for the UNC system office, where he helped develop and articulate student affairs and academic affairs policy for the 16-campus university system.

For two years, 1993–1995, he was executive director of the Washington State Higher Education Coordinating Board, the agency responsible for statewide planning, policy analysis and student financial aid programs for Washington's post-secondary education system. From 1990 to 1993, Floyd served as vice president for student services, vice president for administration, and executive vice president at Eastern Washington University (Cheney, Washington). In the latter role, he was the university's chief operating officer.

Floyd spent 1995-98 at the University of North Carolina, Chapel Hill where he served as chief administrative and operating officer and the senior official responsible for business and finance; human resources; auxiliary enterprises; student affairs; information technology; university advancement and development; and enrollment management.

Floyd was the sixth president of Western Michigan University in Kalamazoo, Michigan, from August 1, 1998 until January 5, 2003. While at Western Michigan he also served as a tenured faculty member in the Department of Counselor Education and Counseling Psychology and in the Department of Teaching, Learning and Leadership.

Floyd was the 21st president of the four-campus University of Missouri for four years (2003–07). He was selected to lead Missouri's land-grant research university on November 11, 2002. It was at Missouri that Floyd picked up the nickname 'E-Flo' by students, who created buttons bearing the phrase, 'I heart E-Flo' for his approachable relationship with the student body. Floyd became president of Washington State University (WSU) on May 21, 2007, his third university presidency. Floyd's tenure was highlighted by:

- Tripling the amount of research grants WSU received annually (from $200 million to $600 million)
- Starting and completing a $1 billion Capital Campaign for WSU
- Creating bipartisan support for a bill that allows WSU to open a Medical School
- Increasing WSU's enrollment by 17%
- Growing WSU's student of color profile from 14% to 26.5%
- Opening WSU North Puget Sound (Everett, Washington)

Today or any other day, there has never been a more impactful president at WSU than Elson Floyd

— Michael C. Worthy, Chairman of the WSU Board of Regents

== E-Flo ==
Floyd was often referred to as "E-Flo" for his approachable style with students. The nickname was given to him originally by the University of Missouri student newspaper, The Maneater. At WSU, Floyd was known for sitting with students in the student sections of basketball and football games. He gave out his personal cell phone number to any student who asked for it – once famously to an entire group of student reporters at the WSU student newspaper, The Daily Evergreen, during a meeting with them.

Buttons were created by University of Missouri students bearing the phrase "I [heart] E-Flo" in 2005, and a similar version of the "I [heart] E-Flo" buttons were created by students at Washington State University on social media to support Floyd in his fight with cancer. The WSU newspaper, The Daily Evergreen, ran a series of articles with the "I [heart] E-Flo" buttons accompanying each article.

== Voluntary pay cut ==
On November 21, 2008, Floyd asked the WSU Board of Regents to cut his pay by $100,000 in light of the difficult budget the university was facing. His salary had been increased from $600,000 to $725,000 in August, making his salary $625,000 after the reduction. It is the largest known salary-reduction of a university president. Floyd said he wanted to "lead by example." Two other university presidents gave self-imposed cuts that week as well. On June 16, 2009, Floyd announced an additional 5% cut to his salary along with other executive board members.

== Board memberships ==
Floyd was on the board of the American Council on Education (ACE) Commission on Leadership and Institutional Effectiveness (2004–present), the Knight Commission on Intercollegiate Athletics (2003–present), President George W. Bush's Advisory Board for the White House Initiative on Historically Black Colleges and Universities (2002–present), The Darlington School Board of Trustees (1997–2000) and the Education Commission of the States (1993). He was a Truman Scholarship Reviewer (1999). On November 15, 2012, Floyd was named an advisor on Governor-elect Jay Inslee's transitions team.

== Personal life ==
Floyd was married to Carmento Floyd. They have two children, now both adults. There was a scandal in 2003 when Carmento, who is black, was recorded telling a black student jailed on domestic violence charges, Ricky Clemons, that he should not date white women and referred to white women as "pink toes."

On June 5, 2015, Floyd took a leave of absence due to cancer. On June 20, 2015, Washington State University announced that Floyd had died of cancer in Pullman, Washington.

== Awards and honors ==
Among other honors, Floyd received the 2004 Distinguished Alumnus Award from the University of North Carolina-Chapel Hill and the Distinguished Alumnus Award from his former high school, Darlington School, in Georgia. He was the recipient of the 2005 Communicator of the Year Award, given by the Mid-Missouri Chapter of the Public Relations Society of America (PRSA), and the 2004 James C. Kirkpatrick Award given by the Northwest Missouri Press Association for public service.

In 2015, Floyd received one of the highest awards in education, the CASE Leadership Award, for his efforts in "Advancement and Support of Education."

Following his death in 2015, the Western Michigan University's board of trustees voted unanimously to dedicate the previously unnamed 343,000 square feet (31,900 m^{2}) home of the College of Engineering and Applied Sciences as Elson S. Floyd Hall. The building and new campus around it was conceptualized and built during his tenure at WMU. Floyd Hall is the largest facility operated by the university.
