= D. Cameron Findlay =

American attorney

Cameron Findlay
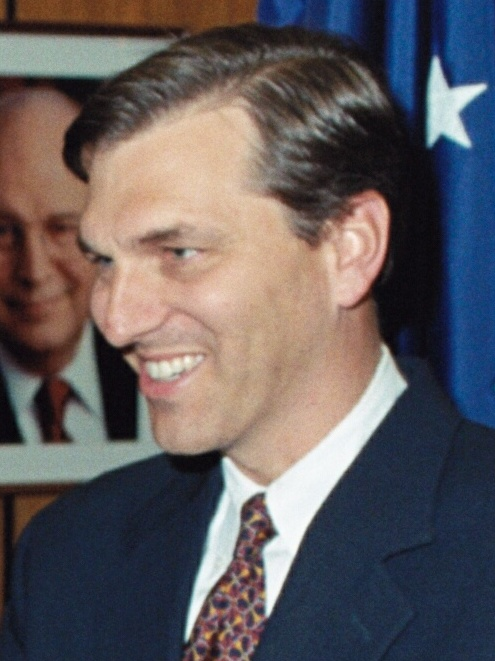
- Born: September 7, 1959; Chicago, Illinois, U.S.
- Died: July 11, 2025 (aged 65); Chicago, Illinois, U.S.
- Education: Northwestern University (BA); University of Oxford (MA); Harvard University (JD)
- Occupation: Attorney
- Known for: Senior vice president, general counsel, and secretary of Archer Daniels Midland Company

Donald Cameron Findlay was an American attorney who was the senior vice president, general counsel, and secretary of Archer Daniels Midland Company, the global agriculture business giant ranked 28th on the Fortune 500 list of largest American companies. He joined ADM in 2013. Prior to that, he served from 2009 to 2013 as senior vice president, general counsel, and secretary of Medtronic, Inc., the world's largest medical device company. Before his time at Medtronic, he was executive vice president and general counsel for Aon Corporation for six years. Previously he served as Deputy Secretary of Labor from 2001 to 2003 in the administration of George W. Bush and as a member of the board of directors of the Overseas Private Investment Corporation. Prior to that, he was a partner in the law firm of Sidley Austin, where his practice focused on complex litigation and regulatory matters for companies in heavily regulated industries like telecommunications and energy. Before his time at Sidley, he served in the White House as a senior aide to President George H.W. Bush.

Findlay has been active in civic and philanthropic affairs. He was a member of the Council of Foreign Relations and has served on the boards of Northwestern University, Steppenwolf Theatre Co., the Minnesota Orchestra, the Chicago Council on Global Affairs, the Economic Club of Chicago, and the Children's Home and Aid Society of Illinois. Equal Justice Works awarded him its “Scales of Justice” award in 2013 to recognize his commitment to public service and the public interest, and the Legal Aid Society awarded him the "William Avery Award" in 2014 to recognize his commitment to pro bono legal services. Legal departments led by Findlay at ADM and Medtronic each were named "Best Legal Department in the US" by Corporate Counsel magazine.

Findlay was born in 1959 in Chicago, Illinois, and grew up in Elkhart, Indiana. He earned a bachelor's degree from Northwestern University, graduating first in his class, then earned a master's degree with first class honors from Oxford University as a Marshall Scholar, and a J.D. magna cum laude from Harvard Law School. Following law school, Findlay served as a law clerk to Judge Stephen F. Williams of the U.S. Court of Appeals for the District of Columbia Circuit from 1987 to 1988 and to Justice Antonin Scalia at the U.S. Supreme Court from 1988 to 1989.

Findlay died on July 11, 2025, at age of 65 in Chicago, Illinois.

== See also ==
- List of law clerks for the ninth seat of the Supreme Court of the United States
