= Western Michigan University =

Public university in Kalamazoo, Michigan, US

- Former names: Western State Normal School (1903–1926), Western State Teachers College (1927–1940), Western Michigan College of Education (1941–1954), Western Michigan College (1955–1957)
- Motto: So that all may learn.
- Type: Public research university
- Established: May 27, 1903; 123 years ago
- Academic affiliations: Space-grant
- Endowment: US$854.4 million (2025)
- President: Russ Kavalhuna
- Faculty: 751 (full-time)
- Students: 16,696 (2026)
- Undergraduates: 13,262 (2026)
- Postgraduates: 3,434 (2026)
- Location: Kalamazoo, Michigan, United States; 42°17′00″N 85°36′50″W
- Campus: Urban
- Newspaper: The Western Herald
- Colors: Brown and Gold
- Nickname: Broncos
- Sporting affiliations: NCAA Division I – MAC, NCHC, SBC
- Mascot: Buster Bronco
- Website: wmich.edu

Western Michigan University (Western Michigan, Western or WMU) is a public research university in Kalamazoo, Michigan, United States. It was initially established as Western State Normal School in 1903 by Governor Aaron T. Bliss for the training of teachers. It was renamed Western Michigan University in 1957.

Western is one of the eight research universities in the state of Michigan and is classified among "R2: Doctoral Universities – High research activity". The university has seven degree-granting colleges, offering 147 undergraduate degree programs, 73 master's degree programs, 30 doctoral programs, and 1 specialist degree program. It is governed by an eight-member board of regents whose members are appointed by the governor of Michigan and confirmed by the Michigan Senate for eight-year terms.

The university's athletic teams compete in Division I of the National Collegiate Athletic Association (NCAA) and are known as the Western Michigan Broncos. They compete in the Mid-American Conference for most sports.

== History ==
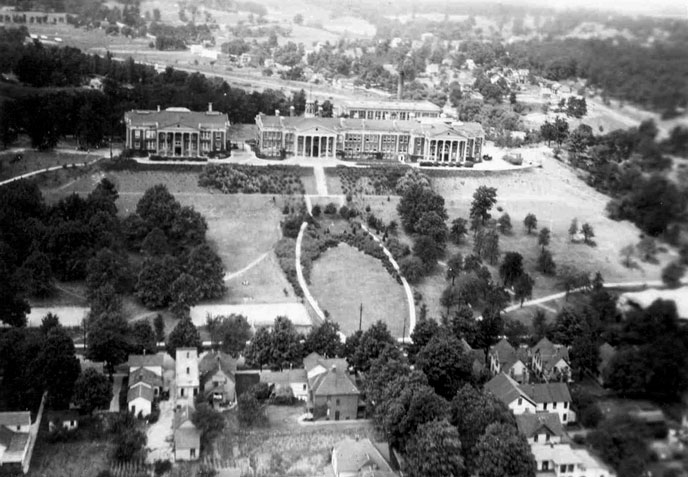
Western State Normal School, 1915

On May 27, 1903, Michigan governor Aaron T. Bliss signed a bill authorizing the creation of a teacher-training facility. Kalamazoo was chosen as the new school's location on August 28, 1903. Other locations considered included Allegan, Muskegon, Grand Rapids, Decatur, Three Oaks, and Hastings. The first building, then known as the Administration Building, and now known as Heritage Hall, was constructed in 1904.

The university was first officially known as Western State Normal School and offered a two-year training program. The first principal was Dwight B. Waldo, who served from 1904 until 1936. The school was renamed several times throughout its early history, beginning with Western State Teachers College in 1927, Western Michigan College of Education in 1941, and Western Michigan College in 1955. It was renamed Western Michigan University in 1957.

Most of the oldest and original WMU buildings are collectively known as East Campus. Because of the steep grade elevating the campus above the city, the Western State Normal Railroad was established in 1907 to carry students and staff up and down the hill with a funicular. It operated until 1949.

Western Michigan University had a partnership with Cooley Law School for over a decade, that on August 13, 2014, culminated in the adoption of a new name and partnership, the Western Michigan University Cooley Law School. In 2020, the university's Board of Trustees voted to end its affiliation with the Cooley Law School.

Western Michigan University was negatively impacted by the COVID-19 pandemic. President Edward B. Montgomery stated "the crisis has already cost WMU well over $45 million, and we expect the tally to rise through the remainder of this fiscal year." To soften the economic toll of the pandemic, WMU instituted a number of cost-cutting measures.

=== Presidents ===
- Dwight B. Waldo (1904–1936)
- Paul V. Sangren (1936–1960)
- James W. Miller (1961–1974)
- John T. Bernhard (1974–1985)
- Diether H. Haenicke (1985–1998)
- Elson S. Floyd (1998–2003)
- Judith I. Bailey (2003–2006)
- John M. Dunn (2007–2017)
- Edward B. Montgomery (2017–2025)
- Russ Kavalhuna (2025-)

== Campus ==
WMU's campuses encompass more than 1,200 acres (4.9 km^{2}) and roughly 150 buildings. Western Michigan University is divided into five campuses in and near Kalamazoo, Michigan:

- West Campus
- East Campus
- Oakland Drive Campus
- Parkview Campus
- College of Aviation in Battle Creek, Michigan

=== West Campus ===
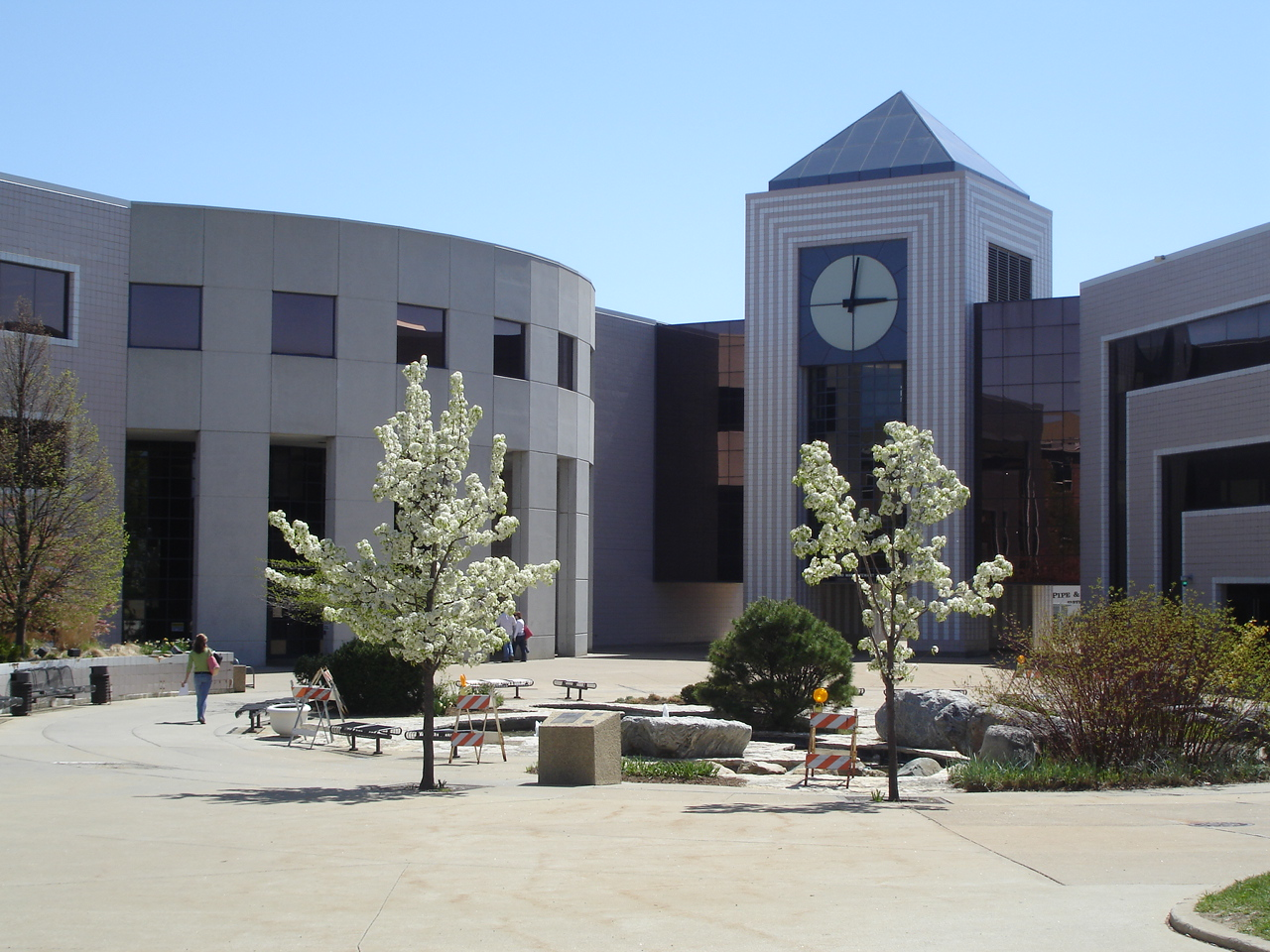
Stewart Clocktower, flanked by Waldo Library to the left, and the University Computing Center.

West Campus is the primary and largest WMU campus in Kalamazoo, and is usually referred to as "Main Campus." Most of the university academic and administrative buildings are on West Campus, including the College of Arts and Sciences, Haworth College of Business, College of Education and Human Development, College of Fine Arts, the Lee Honors College and Waldo Library. Many of the residence halls are found scattered throughout West Campus, while other dormitories (known as "The Valleys") are adjacent to West Campus in Goldsworth Valley.

Waldo Library is the main branch of the university libraries. The library offers books, a cafe, student commons, study rooms, a flight simulator lab, and a virtual reality lab.

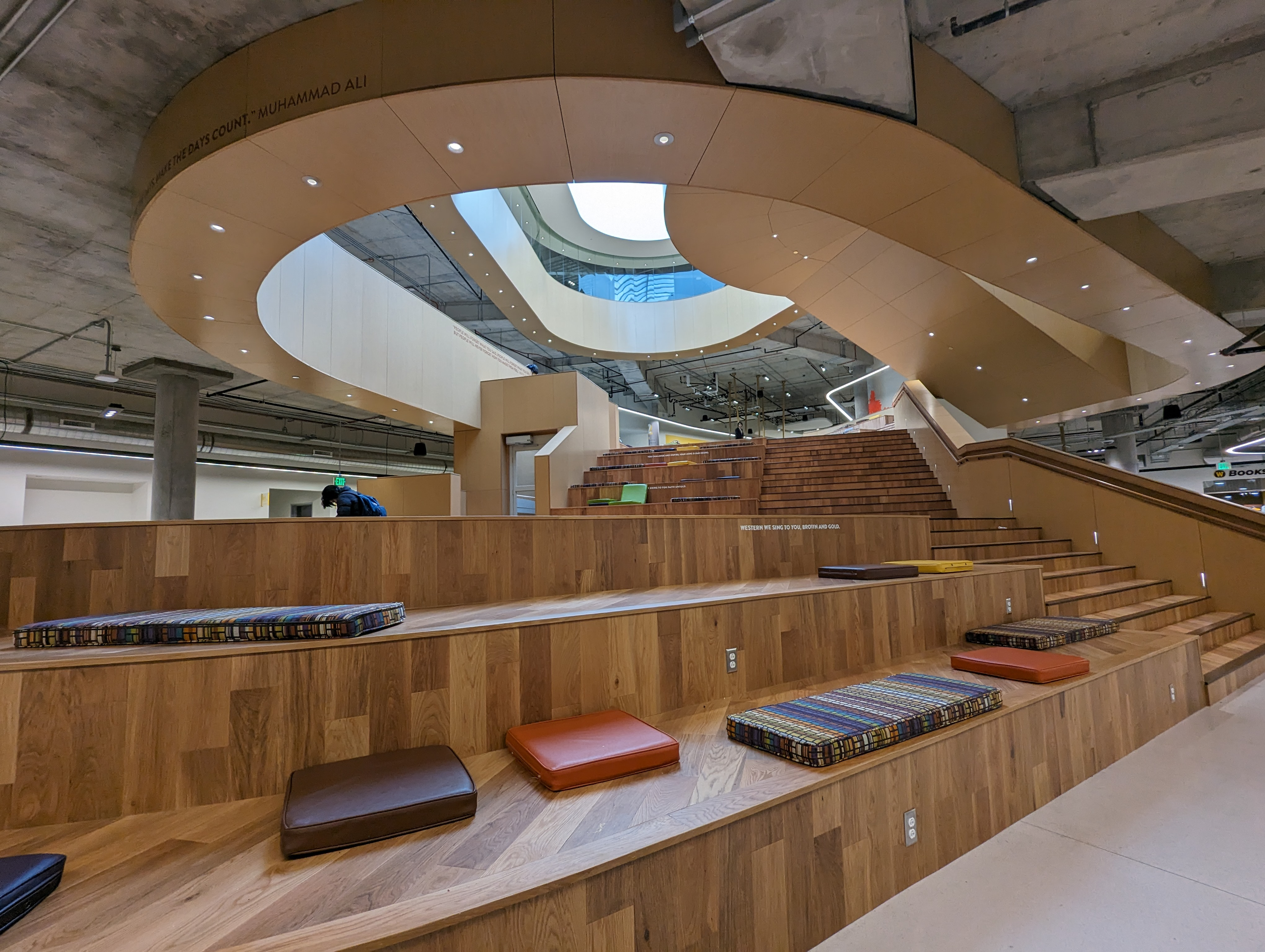
WMU Student Center, interior gathering stairs

The WMU Student Center opened in 2023 and contains a dining center, restaurants, a bank, the campus bookstore, student organization center, and other student services.

West Campus is also the site of Miller Auditorium, a large entertainment venue seating nearly 3500 people. It is Michigan's fourth largest auditorium. The Gilmore Theater Complex, featuring three performance stages and faculty offices, is directly next to Miller Auditorium. The Dalton Center houses the Irving S. Gilmore School of Music and the Department of Dance. The Richmond Center for Visual Arts was added to the Fine Arts Complex in 2007, followed by South Kohrman Hall being renovated into faculty offices and upgraded studio spaces in 2008. Both buildings house the Gwen Frostic School of Art.

=== East Campus ===
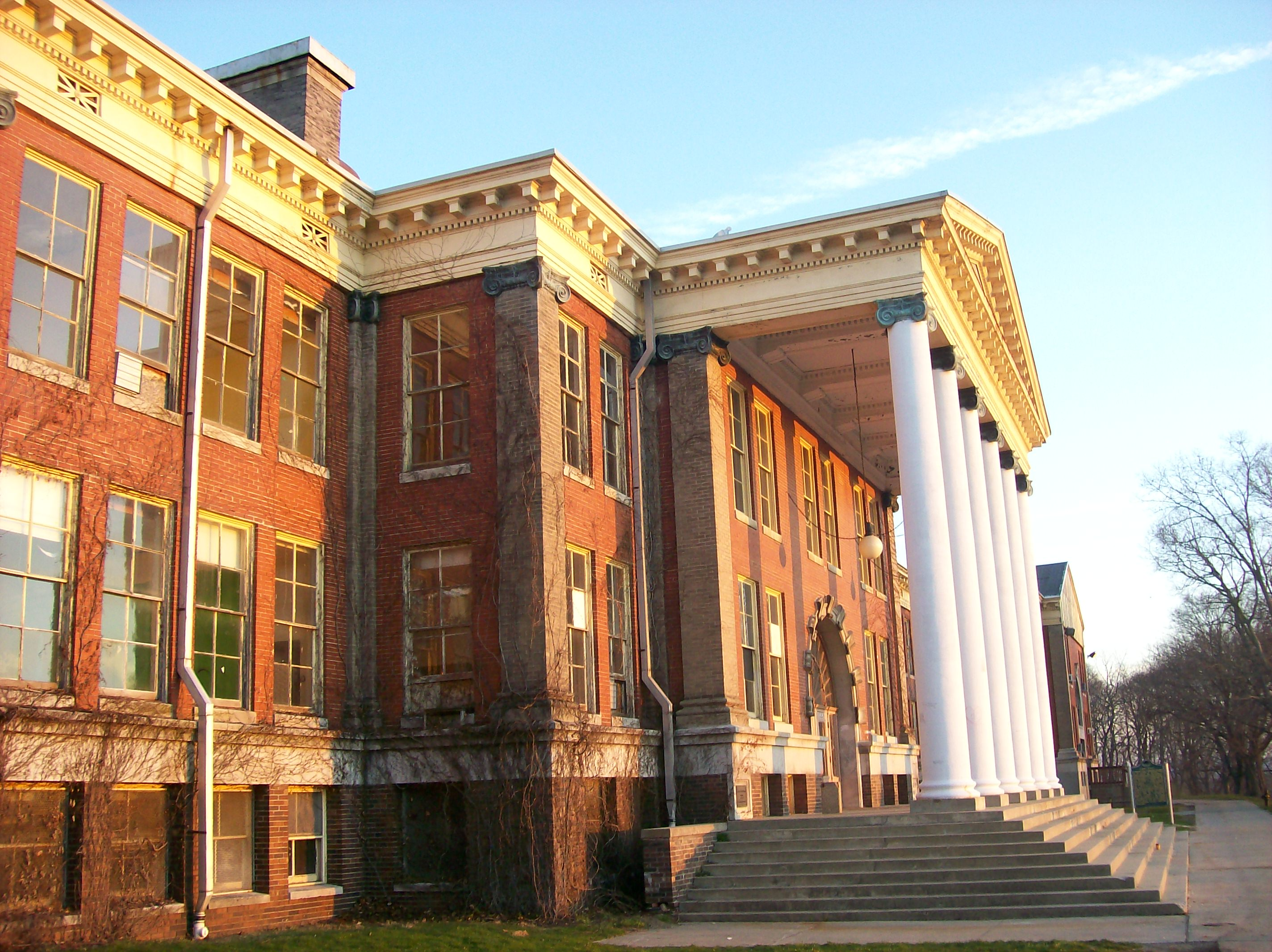
East Hall

East Campus is the original development dating from the university's founding in 1903. It contained many of the university's historical buildings including, East Hall, West Hall, North Hall, Walwood Hall, Spindler Hall, Vandercook Hall, and The Little Theater. Many of these buildings were on a hill overlooking the city of Kalamazoo.

In December 2012, WMU announced plans to renovate its birthplace, historic East Hall, for use as an alumni center, and to demolish several of the university's original historic buildings and utilize the hilltop as green space.

In August 2013 West Hall and the Speech and Hearing building on WMU's East Campus were demolished. The original portion of East Hall was retained, but North Hall and the two side wings of East Hall came down. East Hall reopened in 2015 as Heritage Hall, home to the WMU Alumni Center. In addition to the renovation of East Hall, the portico of North Hall was preserved and positioned just north of East Hall.

=== Oakland Drive Campus ===
The Oakland Drive campus is home to the university's College of Health and Human Services and the WMU Army ROTC program. It is also home to the Western Michigan University Archives and Regional History Collections, located in the Charles C. and Lynn L. Zhang Legacy Collections Center. In 2021, the University Libraries announced that Special Collections would be moving from Waldo Library to the Zhang Center.

=== Parkview Campus ===
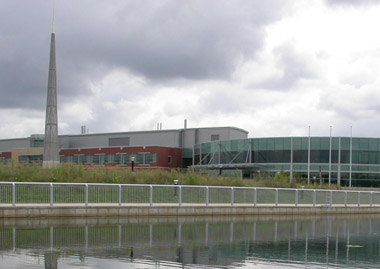
College of Engineering and Applied Sciences, Parkview Campus

The Parkview Campus is home to the university's College of Engineering and Applied Sciences and is within the Business Technology and Research Park. Erected in 2003, the $72.5 million building Floyd Hall is 343,000 square feet (31,900 m^{2}) and features two three-story 600-foot (180 m) wings connected by a middle glass enclosure. The campus is about 3 miles (4.8 km) southwest of the main campus.

The 265-acre (1.07 km^{2}) campus contains the paper coating plant. The school offers 17 undergraduate engineering, technology and applied sciences programs, while the graduate level, the College of Engineering and Applied Sciences offers 9 master programs, and 6 doctoral programs.

=== College of Aviation ===
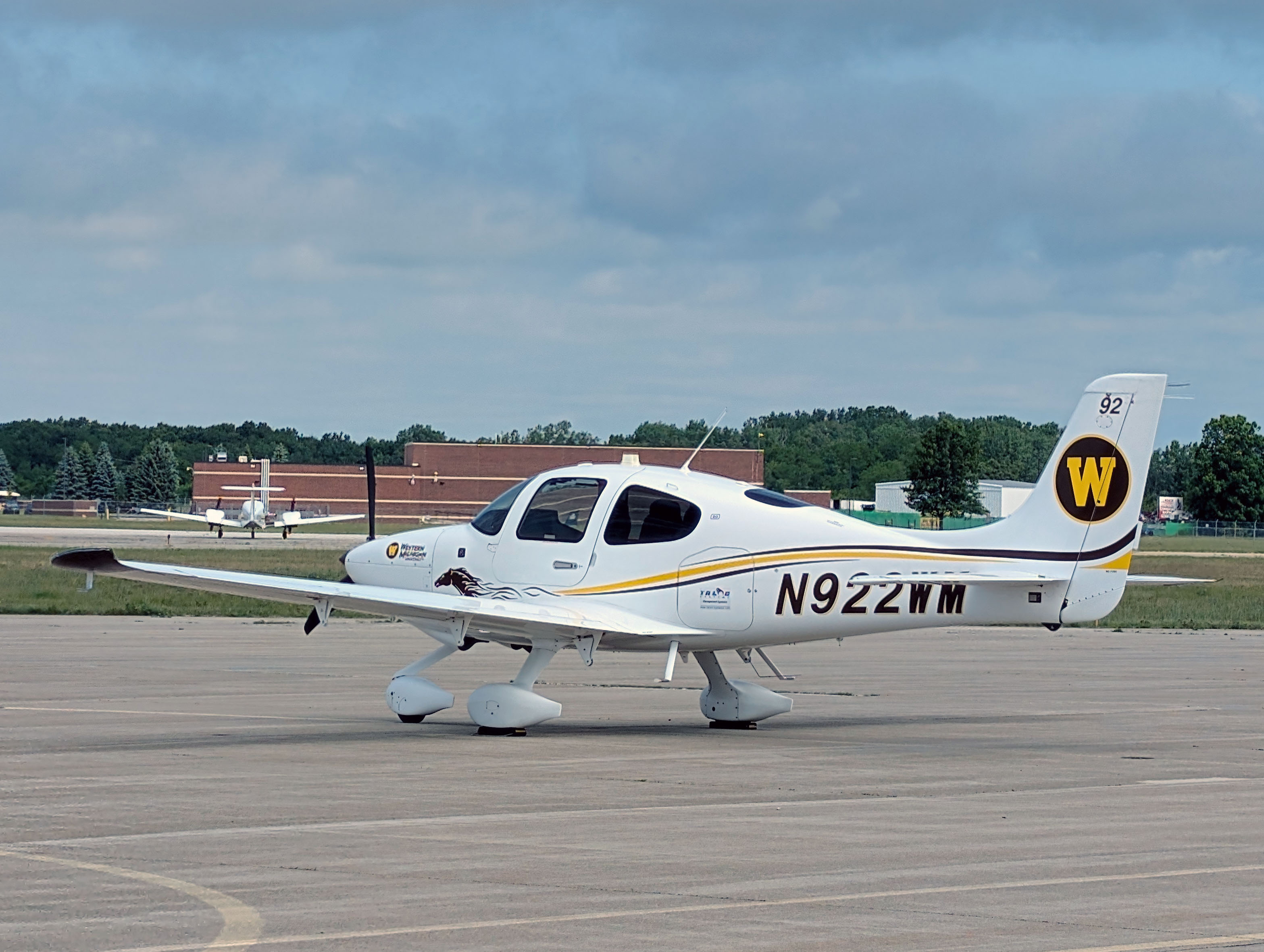
A Cirrus SR20 belonging to WMU

The College of Aviation is in Battle Creek, Michigan at Battle Creek Executive Airport at Kellogg Field. Facilities include the Aviation Education Center, Flight Operations Building, the Aircraft Maintenance Building, and storage hangars. The College runs a Cirrus SR-20 fleet, turbine engine testing sites, and aviation maintenance training facilities. Additionally the College of Aviation has a fleet of Piper PA-44 Seminole, one Piper PA-18 Super Cub, and one American Champion Super Decathlon used for flight training.

Because the demand for training was high, the city of Battle Creek and the Air National Guard, in conjunction with the College of Aviation, constructed a new runway just to the west of the original runway 23 and parallel to it. This caused Battle Creek's main runway to be renamed runway 23R and the new runway 23L. The project's cost was around $7 million, 95% of the money coming from the government. The runway is now fully "operational".

From August 2017 to August 2019, Western Michigan University operated a satellite campus in Punta Gorda, Florida near the Punta Gorda Airport with additional facilities being located on the airfield. It was announced in February 2019 that WMU Punta Gorda would close due to low enrollment numbers.

=== Regional sites ===
Western Michigan University also has several regional sites that offer education to more than 6,000 students each year. These regional sites are in cities throughout Michigan:

- Battle Creek
- Benton Harbor
- Grand Rapids
- Metro Detroit

== Academics ==
=== Undergraduate admissions ===
Undergraduate admissions statistics
- 2021 entering class
- Admit rate: 82.8% ( +0.5)
- Yield rate: 13.5% (▼ −12.6)

Test scores middle 50%
- SAT Total: 1000–1200 (among 37.1% of FTFs)
- ACT Composite: 21–27 (among 6.7% of FTFs)

WMU is considered "selective" by U.S. News & World Report. For the Class of 2025 (enrolled fall 2021), WMU received 18,853 applications and accepted 15,612 (82.8%). Of those accepted, 2,112 enrolled, a yield rate (the percentage of accepted students who choose to attend the university) of 13.5%. WMU's freshman retention rate is 77.2%, with 56.3% going on to graduate within six years.

The enrolled first-year class of 2025 had the following standardized test scores: the middle 50% range (25th percentile-75th percentile) of SAT scores was 1000–1200, while the middle 50% range of ACT scores was 21–27.

Fall First-Time Freshman Statistics
	2021	2020	2019	2018	2017	2016
Applicants	18,853	16,582	17,698	17,051	14,263	13,613
Admits	15,612	14,085	14,133	13,829	11,741	11,205
Admit rate	82.8	84.9	79.9	81.1	82.3	82.3
Enrolled	2,112	2,613	2,919	3,023	3,178	2,930
Yield rate	13.5	18.6	20.7	21.9	27.1	26.1
ACT composite* (out of 36)	21–27 (6.7%^{†})	20–27 (22.4%^{†})	19–26 (28.5%^{†})	20–26 (32.9%^{†})	20–26 (44.9%^{†})	19–25 (96.2%^{†})
SAT composite* (out of 1600)	1000–1200 (37.1%^{†})	1010–1210 (66.5%^{†})	1000–1210 (81.5%^{†})	1000–1190 (81.5%^{†})	970–1180 (69.3%^{†})	—
* middle 50% range^{†} percentage of first-time freshmen who chose to submit

=== Academic divisions ===
Academic rankings

National
- Forbes: 564
- U.S. News & World Report: 293 (tie)
- Washington Monthly: 199
- WSJ/College Pulse: 401–500

Global
- QS: 1001–1200
- U.S. News & World Report: 1545 (tie)

WMU is classified among "R2: Doctoral Universities – High research activity". It has 147 undergraduate degree programs, 73 master's degree programs, 30 doctoral programs, and 1 specialist degree program.

WMU has ten academic divisions:

- College of Arts and Sciences
- College of Aviation
- Haworth College of Business
- College of Education and Human Development
- College of Engineering and Applied Sciences
- College of Fine Arts
- College of Health and Human Services
- Merze Tate College
- Lee Honors College
- Graduate College

The university has seven degree-granting colleges: the College of Arts and Sciences, the College of Aviation, the Haworth College of Business, the College of Education and Human Development, the College of Engineering and Applied Sciences, the College of Fine Arts and the College of Health and Human Services. In addition to the Graduate College and the Lee Honors College., the University restructured the University College, the academic home for exploratory majors, and renamed it for WMU alumnae Merze Tate in 2021.

Its most popular undergraduate majors, by 2021 graduates, were Multi-/Interdisciplinary Studies (216), Finance (147), and Accounting (145).

The Haworth College of Business is the university's business school. One of the largest business schools in the United States, it has some 4,000 undergraduate students and 500 Master of Business Administration (MBA) and Master of Accountancy (MSA) students. The college is in Schneider Hall on the main campus. The College of Business was renamed in honor of alumnus G. W. Haworth after Haworth gave a large donation in the 1980s.

=== Medical school ===
Western Michigan began planning a medical school in 2008, named Western Michigan University Homer Stryker M.D. School of Medicine, which admitted its first class in August 2014. Privately funded and created in partnership with Borgess Medical Center and Bronson Methodist Hospital, the school was seeded by a $100 million cash donation from Dr. Homer Stryker's granddaughter, Ronda Stryker, and her husband William Johnston, a WMU trustee – the largest cash gift ever given to a college or university in Michigan. At the time it was the 15th largest cash gift ever given to any public university in the nation.

=== Law school ===
In 2001, WMU and the Thomas M. Cooley Law School entered into a partnership where students could obtain a Master in Public Administration from WMU while simultaneously working on a Juris Doctor degree from Cooley. In 2008, WMU and Cooley expanded this partnership so now WMU students enrolled in both MPA and Masters in Business Administration programs at WMU may simultaneously work on obtaining a Juris Doctor degree from Cooley Law School at Western Michigan University. The university ended its affiliation with the Cooley Law School in 2020. The law school closed its campus in Kalamazoo, Michigan in 2020.

== Student life ==
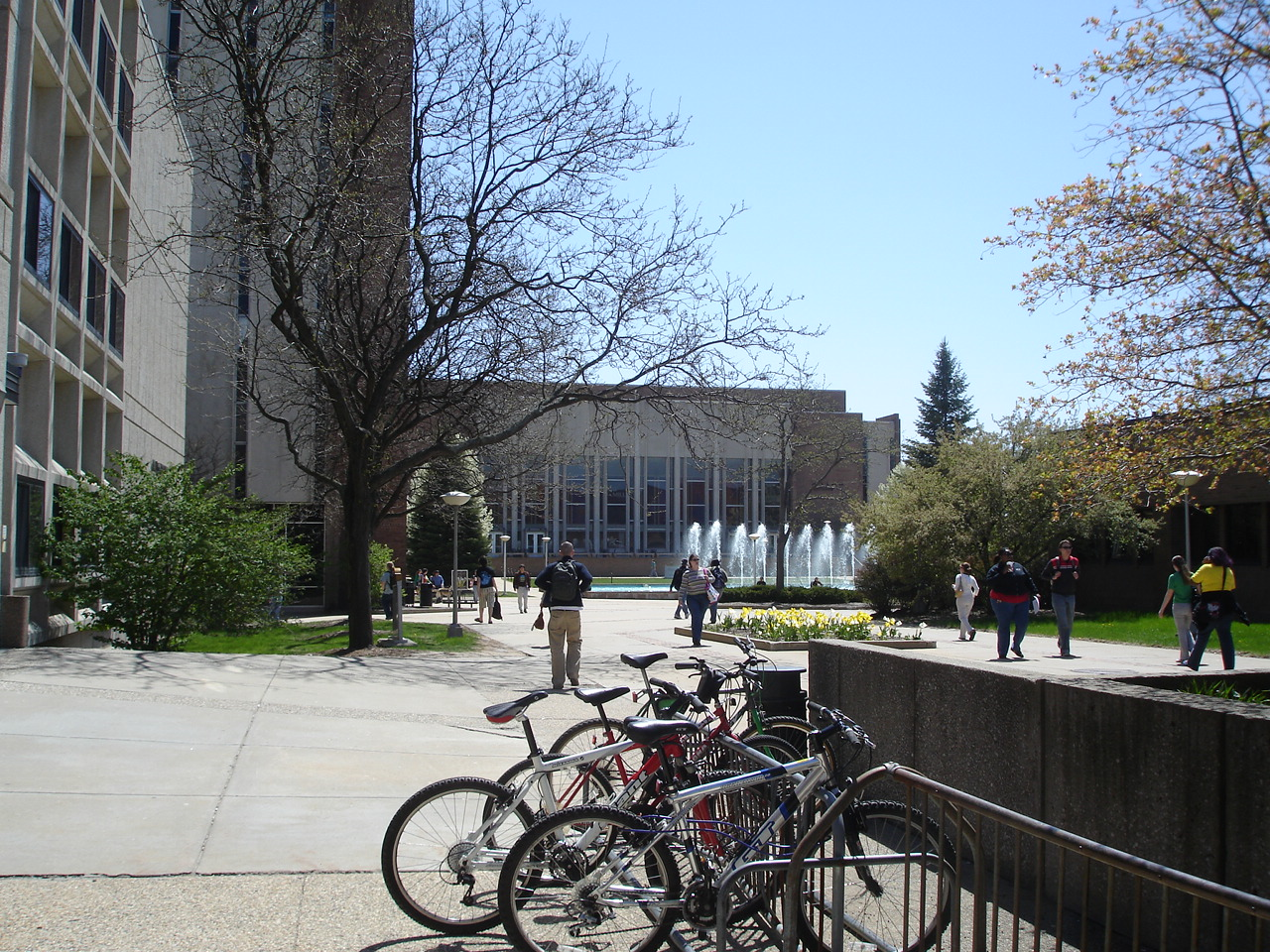
Students enjoying WMU's Main Campus on a spring day.

Student body composition as of May 2, 2022
Race and ethnicity	Total
White	68%
Black	10%
Hispanic	8%
Other (Note: Other consists of Multiracial Americans & those who prefer to not say.)	6%
Foreign national	5%
Asian	2%
Economic diversity
Low-income (Note: The percentage of students who received an income-based federal Pell grant intended for low-income students.)	28%
Affluent (Note: The percentage of students who are a part of the American middle class at the bare minimum.)	72%

=== Entertainment ===
The Campus Activities Board is the main student organization responsible for bringing entertainment events for students. The organization sponsors concerts, comedians, films, and special events.

=== Student government ===
The Western Student Association (WSA) along with the Graduate Student Association (GSA) are the "primary" body of student government at Western Michigan University.

=== Social groups ===
WMU sponsors or recognizes several groups aimed towards personal and social development. This includes faith and spiritual development, the Office of LBGT Student Services, Greek Life, services for International Students, Multicultural Affairs, Off-Campus Life, and Sponsored Student Organizations. WMU also has around 400 student organizations registered through the university that are available to any student.

=== Student activism ===
Placement of the Chemistry Building generated much controversy from student groups because it displaced a large portion of greenery in the center of West Campus. A temporary outdoor plaza was constructed outside of Sangren Hall in 2007 to replace the greenery. However, this also generated controversy and protests among students and faculty because of its aesthetic characteristics and costs. One such protest by a student group involved requesting the financial records of the construction and using chalk to depict the costs of each item on the plaza.

=== Student newspaper ===
The Western Herald is the school's student newspaper. It began printing in 1916 and was known as the Western Normal Herald until 1927. The Western Herald maintains a staff of approximately about 40 students. It is the oldest registered student organization at Western Michigan University.

=== Fraternities and sororities ===
There are 37 Greek Life chapters.

== Athletics ==
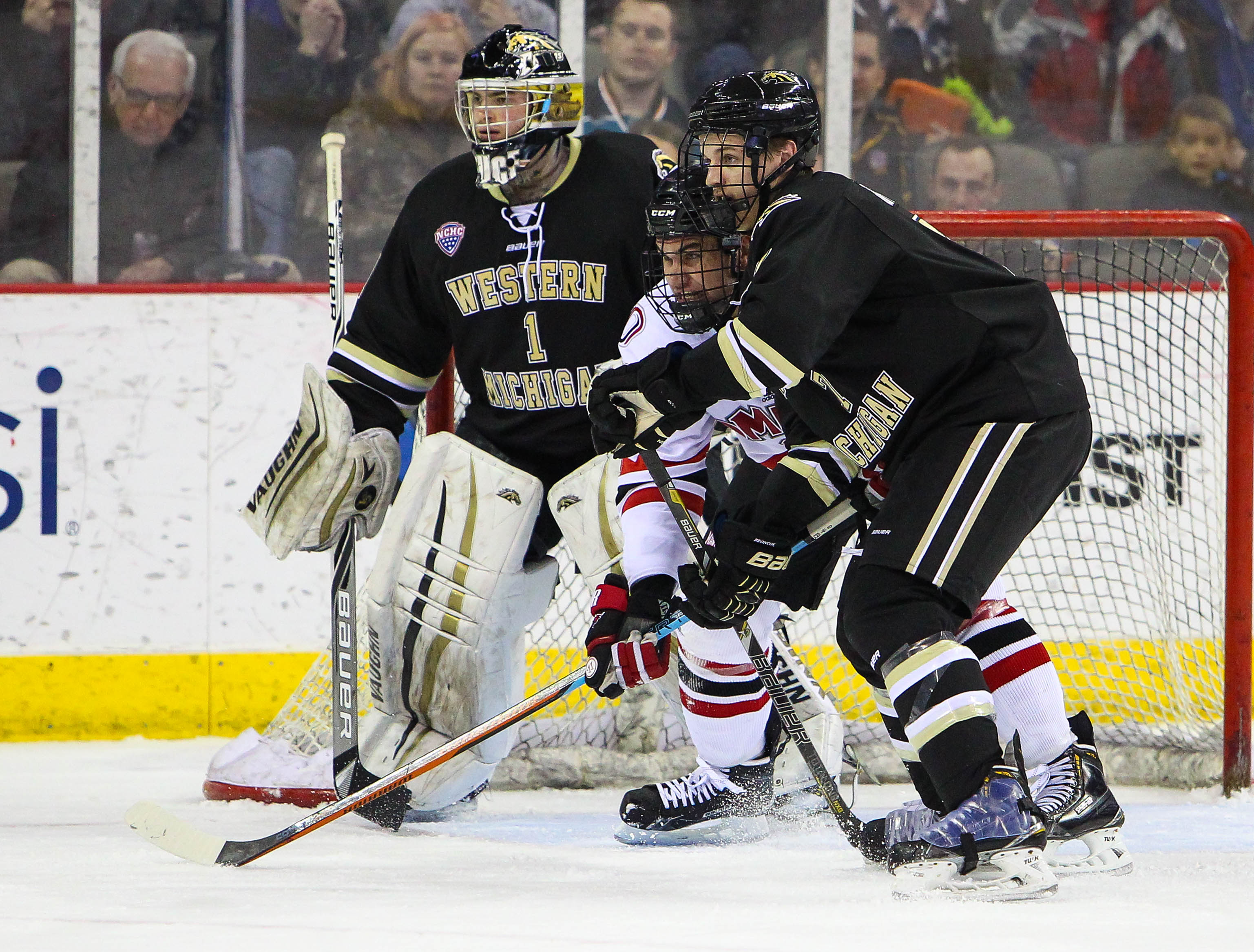
A Western Michigan Broncos men's ice hockey game against Omaha in 2015

The Western Michigan Broncos are a National Collegiate Athletic Association (NCAA) Division I Football Bowl Subdivision school. They compete in the Mid-American Conference in men's basketball, baseball, football, and tennis; and women's basketball, cross-country, golf, gymnastics, soccer, softball, track and field, and volleyball. The men's hockey team competes in the National Collegiate Hockey Conference. The Men's Soccer team plays in the Missouri Valley Conference.

The Western Michigan Broncos main rival is the Central Michigan Chippewas who also compete in the Mid-American Conference.

Also, in 1955, the Broncos lost to Wake Forest in the NCAA College World Series 7 to 6.

== School songs ==
The current alma mater, Brown and Gold, and the current WMU fight song are the result of a 1959 contest to replace existing songs. Alumnus James H. Bull won the lyrics stage with his entry for Brown and Gold. Alumnus Walter Gilbert took the honors for the fight song lyrics and the music for both the fight song and alma mater.

== Notable alumni ==
Western Michigan University has had a number of notable alumni. Among them are:

- Tim Allen, actor
- Curtis Armstrong, actor
- Mohammed Asif, professional sailor and space propulsion researcher
- Bruce Campbell, actor
- Sean Chiplock, voice actor
- Terry Crews, actor and football player
- Danny DeKeyser, hockey player
- Gershwin A. Drain, federal judge
- Greg Jennings, football player
- Lucy Lameck, politician
- Crystal Lucas-Perry, actress
- Marin Mazzie, actress
- Richelle Mead, author
- Mike Nahan, politician
- Frank Quilici, baseball player
- TooTurntTony, media personality
- Homer Stryker, founder of the Fortune 500 company Stryker Corporation
- Merze Tate, international relations scholar
- Wayne Static, musician
- Luther Vandross, musician and record producer
- Daisy Wende, fashion designer
