= Judith Bailey (academic) =

American college president

Judith I. Bailey

7th President of Western Michigan University
- In office 2003–2006
- Preceded by: Elson Floyd
- Succeeded by: Diether Haenicke (interim)

Personal details
- Born: Judith Irene Hege; August 24, 1946 (age 80) North Carolina
- Education: Coker College, Virginia Tech

Judith Irene Bailey (née Hege; born August 24, 1946) is an American academic who served as president of Northern Michigan University (1997–2003) and Western Michigan University (2003–2006).

== Biography ==
Bailey came to WMU from Northern Michigan University where she served as president from 1997 to 2003, as the first female president of the university. Prior to assuming the presidency at NMU, Bailey was Vice President of Academic Affairs and Provost at the University of Maine as well as Vice President for Research and Public Service and Director of Cooperative Extension Service. Previously, she served in leadership roles in the Office of Extension Service of the University of the District of Columbia and the University of Maryland. She also has taught at George Mason University and the University of Maryland.

A native of North Carolina, Bailey earned a bachelor's degree in English from Coker College in Hartsville, SC. That school honored her in 1998 with its Distinguished Alumni Achievement Award. She earned her master's and doctoral degree from Virginia Tech in 1973 and 1976, respectively, and in 2005, she received Virginia Tech's Graduate Alumni Achievement Award. She also attended Harvard University's Institute for Educational Management in 1994 and took part in the institute's 1996 alumni seminar.

== Western Michigan University ==
=== Achievements ===
In 2004, Bailey launched implementation of a new Student Information System, "GoWMU", that dramatically altered students' electronic access to academic resources and services as well as streamlined operations across the campus.

=== Termination ===
On August 15, 2006, the Board of Trustees of Western Michigan University fired Bailey over drop of enrollment, after total enrollment fell from approximately 30,000 students to 25,000 over the three years she led the university. Bailey's termination by the board came after she refused an offer to buy out her contract, worth upwards of $400,000, if she resigned. Former president Diether Haenicke was named interim president at the same time. On October 27, 2006, it was announced that Bailey and the university had agreed to a severance package of $530,000.

== After WMU ==
Bailey has been president and senior consultant of JIHBAILEY ASSOCIATES, serving higher education and other nonprofits since 2006.

In January 2007, she became a senior fellow at the American Association of State Colleges and Universities. Bailey served as Interim Senior Executive Director of Enrollment Management at East Carolina University in Greenville, North Carolina, from July 2007–May 2009. From May 2009–February 2011, she served as Interim Associate Director of University Advancement at Winston-Salem State University in Winston-Salem, North Carolina.

Bailey was granted status as President Emeritus of Northern Michigan University on May 1, 2013.
