= Horned deity =

Deity depicted with horns or antlers

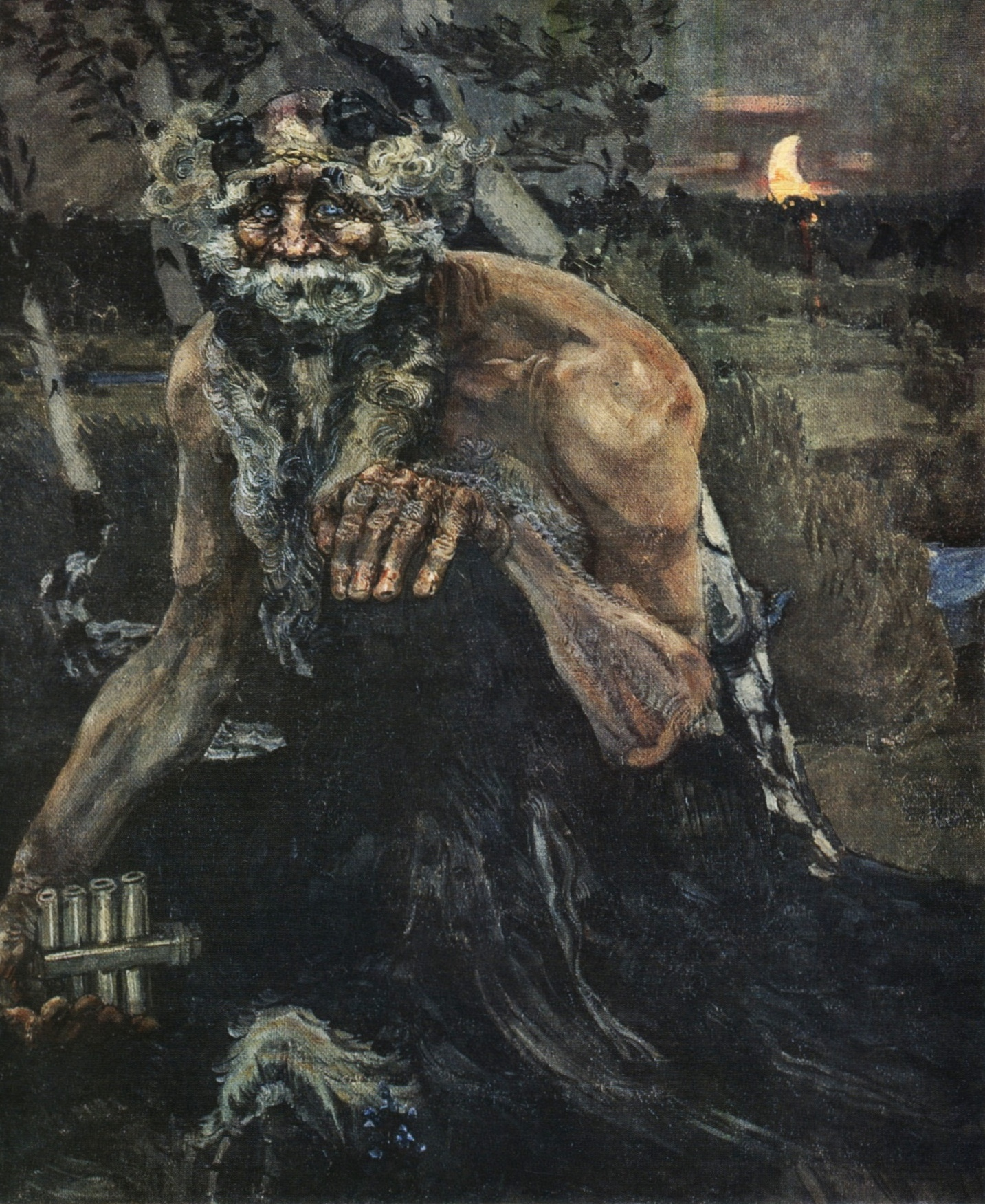
Pan, painted by Mikhail Vrubel in 1899.

Deities depicted with horns or antlers are found in numerous religions across the world. Horned animals, such as bulls, goats, and rams, may be worshiped as deities or serve as inspiration for a deity's appearance in religions that venerate animal gods. Many pagan religions include horned gods in their pantheons, such as Pan in Greek mythology and Ikenga in Odinala. Some neopagan religions have reconstructed these deities into the concept of the Horned God, representing the male aspect of divinity in Wiccan belief.

In Abrahamic religions, horned deities are often associated with demonology. Christian demons are described as having horns in the Book of Revelation, and figures such as Satan, Baphomet, and Beelzebub are typically depicted with horns.

== By religion ==
=== American ===
The Horned Serpent appears in the mythologies of many Native Americans in the United States. Details vary among tribes, with many of the stories associating the mystical figure with water, rain, lightning and thunder. Horned Serpents were major components of the Southeastern Ceremonial Complex of North American prehistory.

=== Canaanite ===
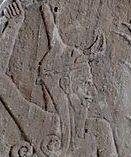
Baal with Thunderbolt, 15th–13th century BC. Stele found at Ras Shamra (ancient city of Ugarit in present-day Syria).

Some Canaanite deities such as Baal and El were likely originally horned bull gods.

=== Indus Valley ===
Several Indus seals show a fighting scene between a tiger-like beast and a man with horns, hooves and a tail, who has been compared to the Mesopotamian bull-man Enkidu, also a partner of Gilgamesh, and suggests a transmission of Mesopotamian mythology.

The Pashupati seal, a seal discovered during the excavation of Mohenjo-daro in Pakistan has drawn attention as a possible representation of a "proto-Shiva" figure. This "Pashupati" (Lord of animal-like beings – Sanskrit paśupati) seal shows a seated figure with horns, possibly ithyphallic, surrounded by animals.

A divinity mentioned in Jain sources known as Harinegameshin is sometimes described as having the head of an antelope or goat.

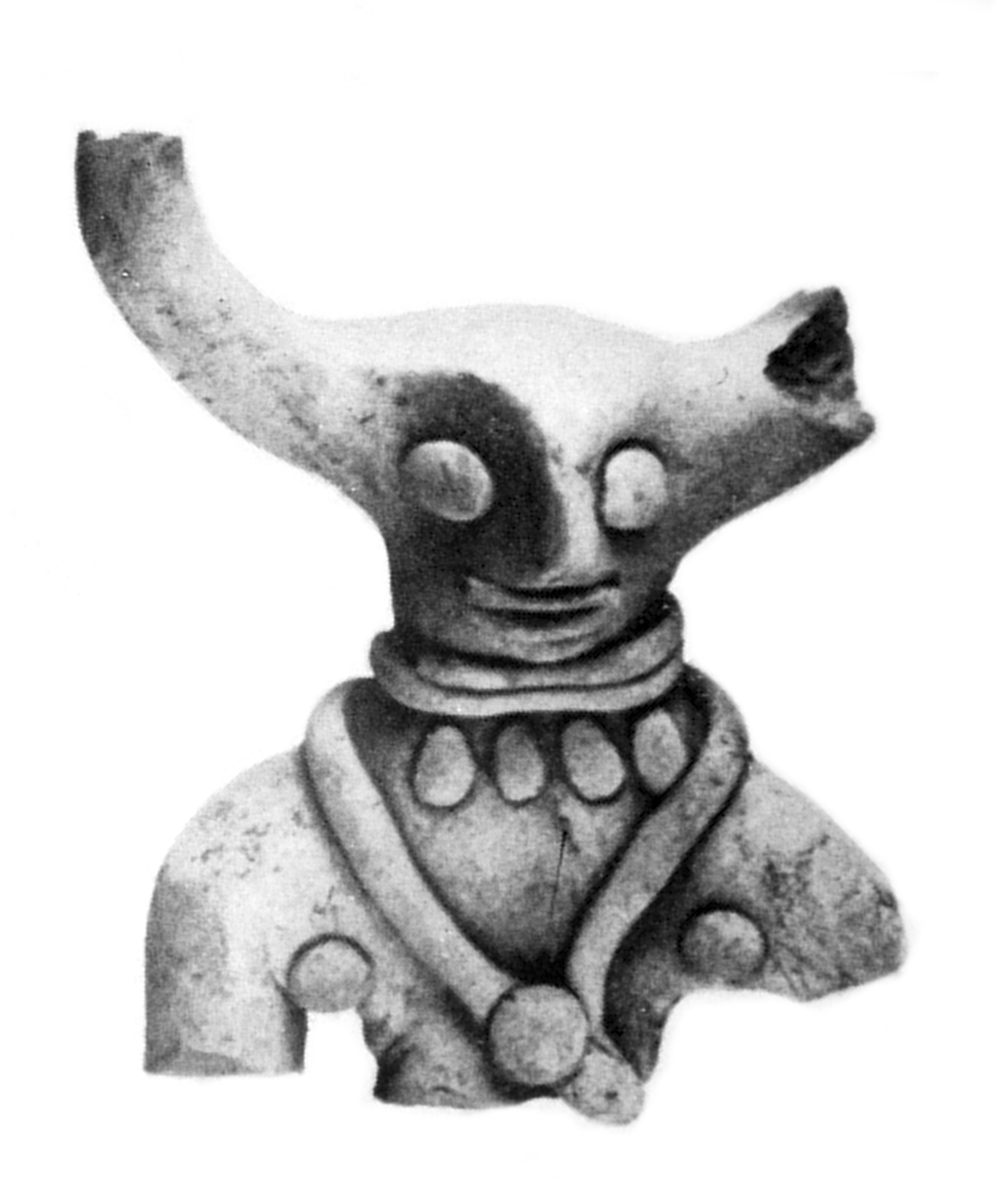
Indus pottery figure of horned deity

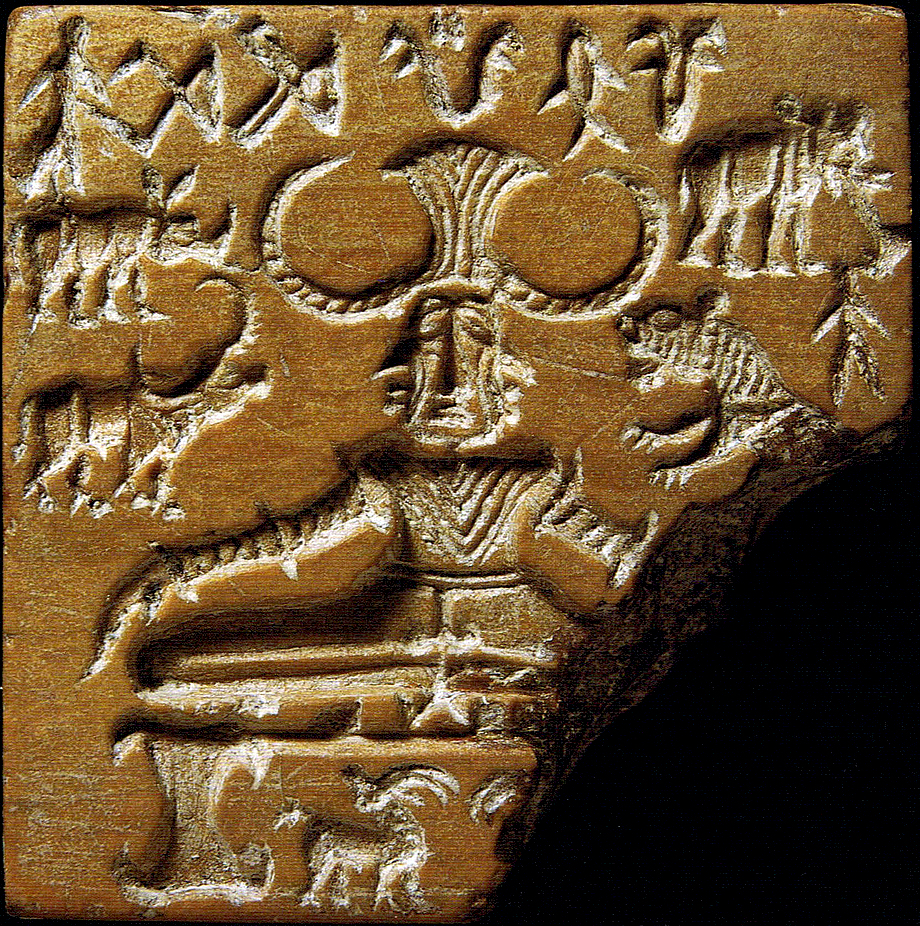
Indus Pashupati seal

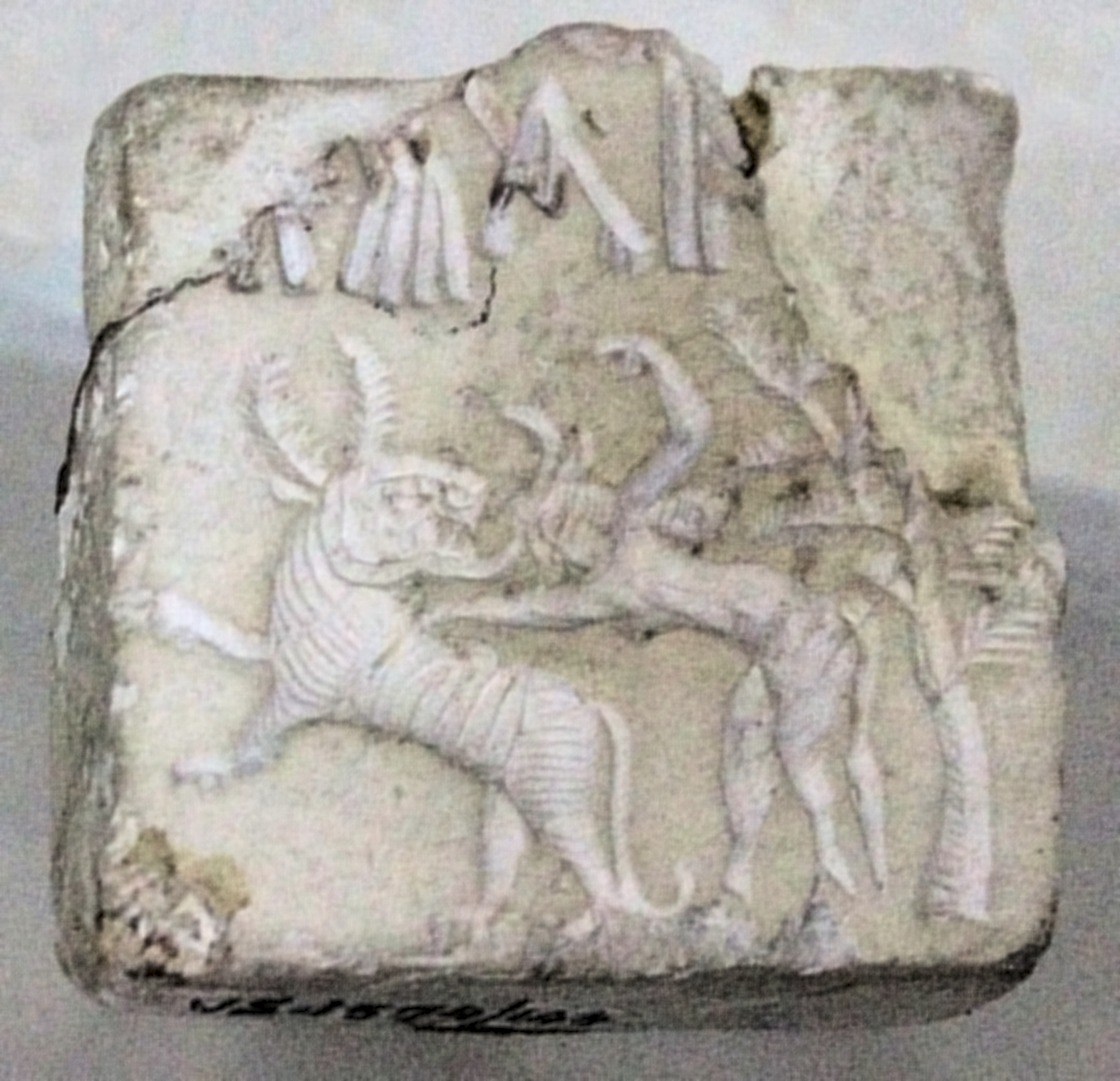
Fighting scene between a beast and a man with horns, hooves and a tail, who has been compared to the Mesopotamian bull-man Enkidu. Indus Valley civilization seal.

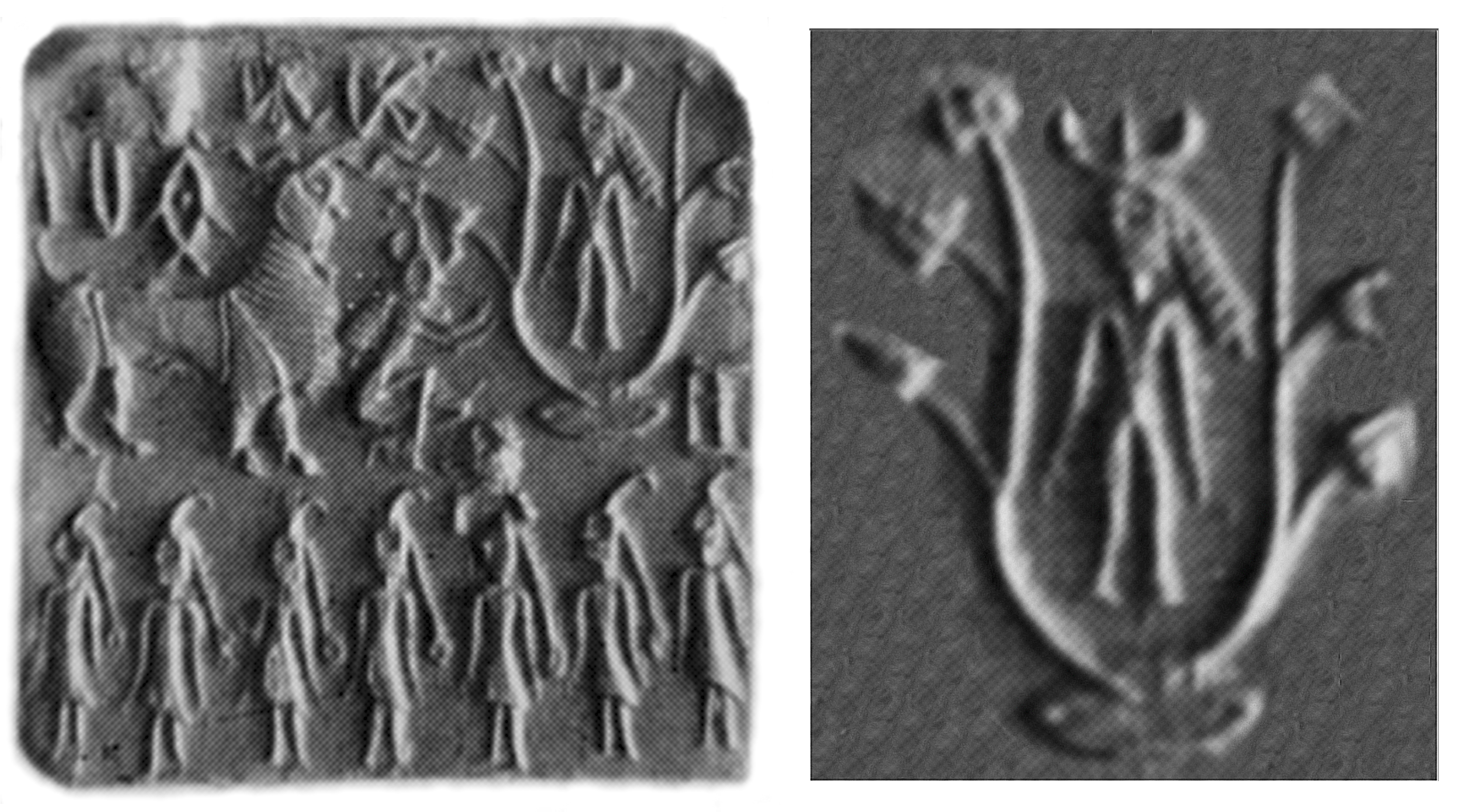
Horned deity with one-horned attendants on an Indus Valley seal. Horned deities are a standard Mesopotamian theme. 2000-1900 BCE. Islamabad Museum.

=== Carthage ===
Baal-Hamon was especially associated with the ram and was worshiped also as Baʿal Qarnaim ("Lord of Two Horns") in an open-air sanctuary at Jebel Bu Kornein ("the two-horned hill") across the bay from Carthage.

=== Celtic ===
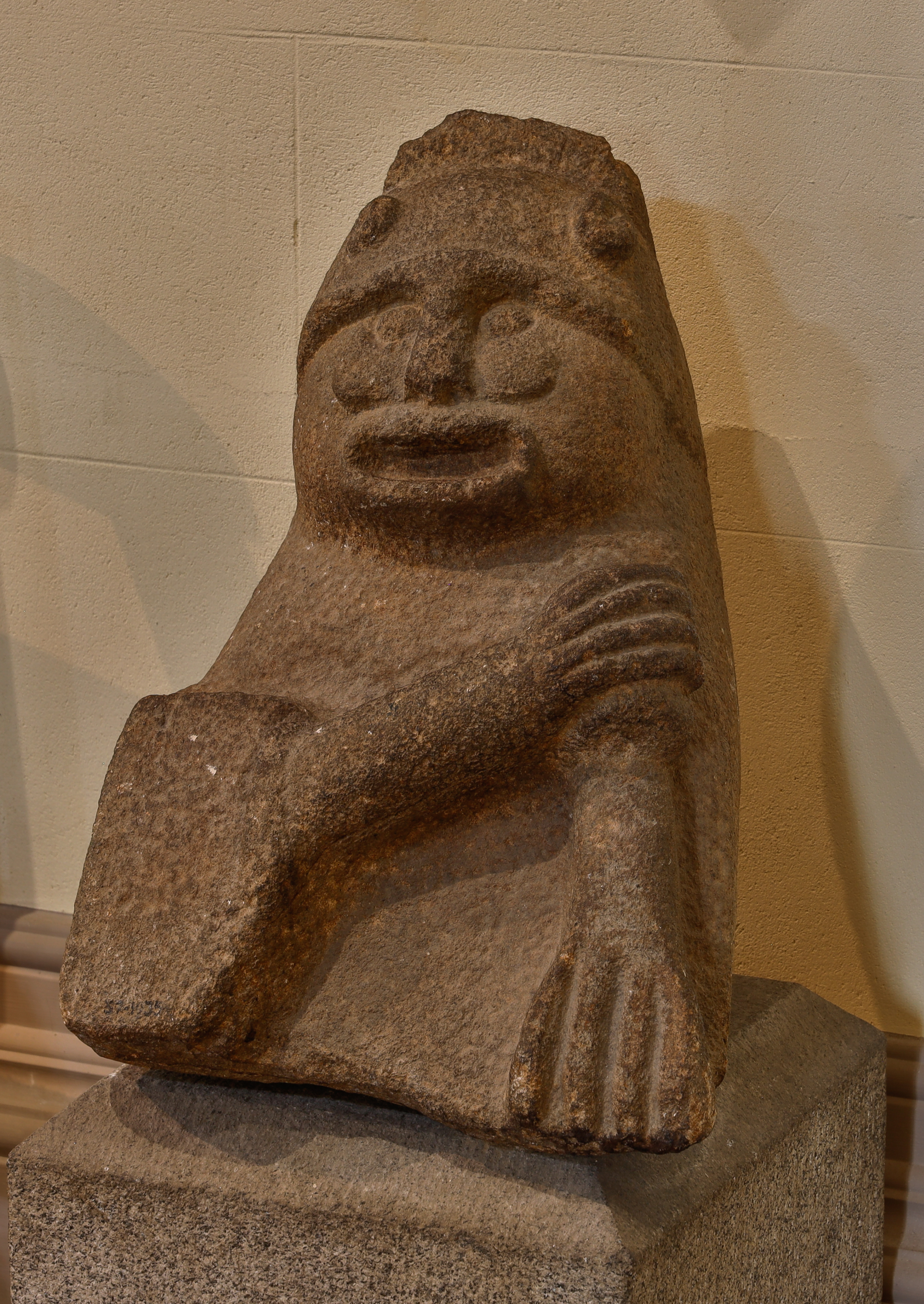
The Tandragee Idol, Northern Ireland, c. 1000 BC

Depictions in Celtic cultures of figures with antlers are often identified as Cernunnos (Gaulish: "horned one"), such as those on the Pillar of the Boatman in Paris, France, and the Gundestrup cauldron in Himmerland, Denmark.

=== Egyptian ===
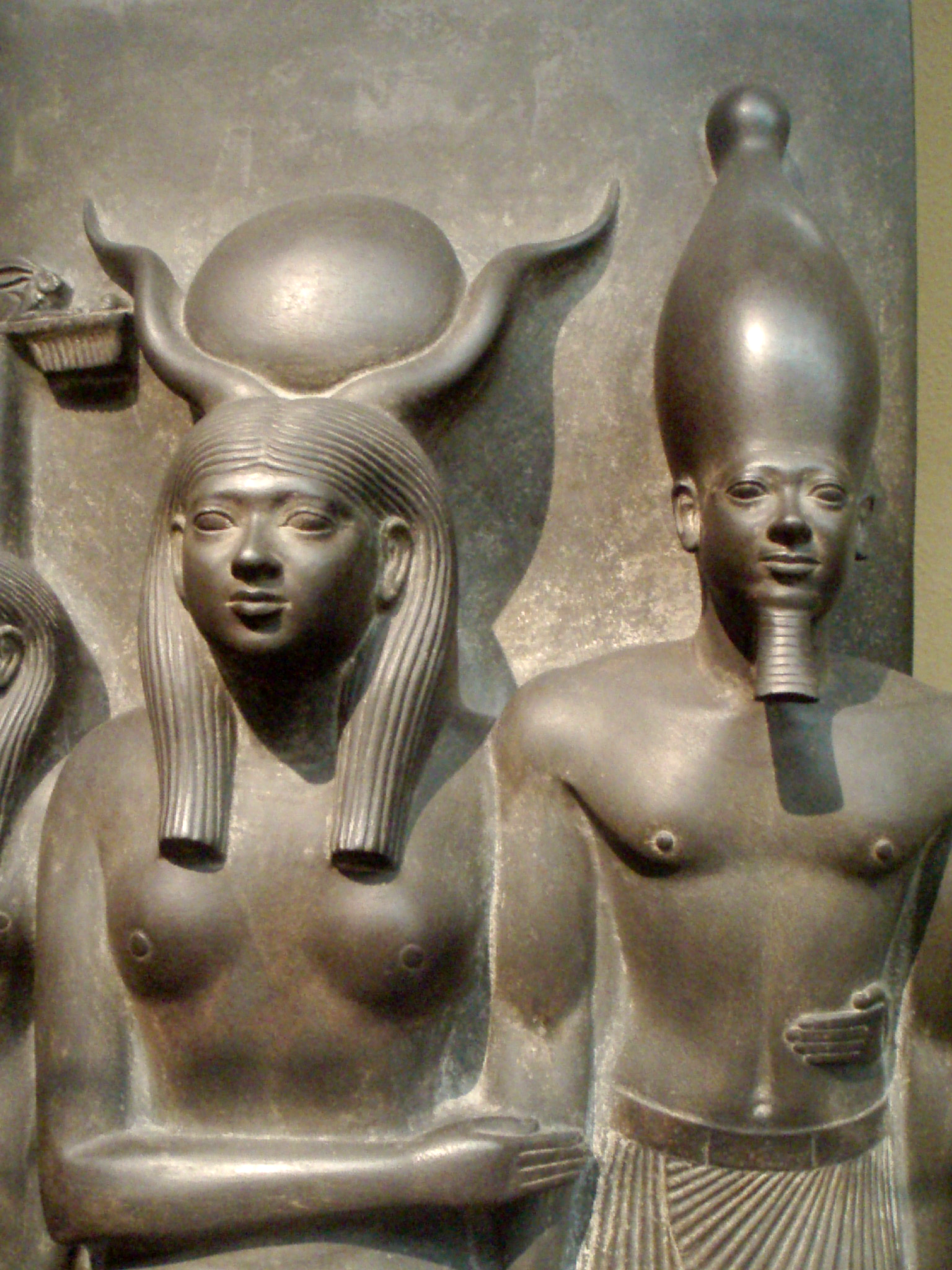
Close-up of a triad statue depicting the pharaoh Menkaura being held by the goddess Hathor

In ancient Egyptian religion, bulls held significant symbolic and religious importance. The Apis bull, for instance, was one of the most revered sacred animals, associated with fertility, regeneration, and divine power. Worshiped in the Memphis region, the bull was believed to embody the spirit of Ptah, god of craftsmen, and later became linked with Osiris, the god of the afterlife. In Ptolemaic Egypt, Mnevis, another bull god, was considered the ba of Ra and the physical manifestation of Atum. Bat, the principal goddess of Hu, was depicted as woman with a cow's ears and horns. Her worship dates back to the earliest times, possibly originating from Late Paleolithic cattle herding. By the Middle Kingdom period, her identity and attributes were absorbed by Hathor, goddess of love and femininity. Like Bat, Hathor was depicted as a woman with a cow's ears and horns. The notable distinction between their depictions is that Bat's horns curve inward, while Hathor's horns curve outward slightly, which may reflect the different breeds of cattle herded in various eras.

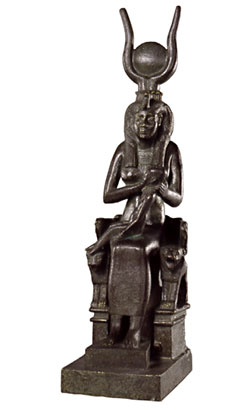
Isis with horns

Isis, another maternal goddess, was traditionally depicted with a throne on her head. However, during the Old Kingdom period, she was portrayed with cow horns framing a sun disk, specifically in the Pyramid Texts.

The ram, symbolizing fertility and war, was revered with such gods as Heryshaf in Heracleopolis and Khnum in Elephantine and Esna. Khnum's wife, Satet, is traditionally depicted with antelope horns.

In Mendes, Banebdjedet was typically shown with four ram heads to represent the four souls (Ba) of the sun god. Banebdjedet may also be linked to the first four gods to rule over Egypt, Osiris, Geb, Shu and Ra-Atum, with large granite shrines devoted to each in the Mendes sanctuary. The Book of the Heavenly Cow describes the "Ram of Mendes" as being the Ba of Osiris, but this was not an exclusive association.

=== Libya ===
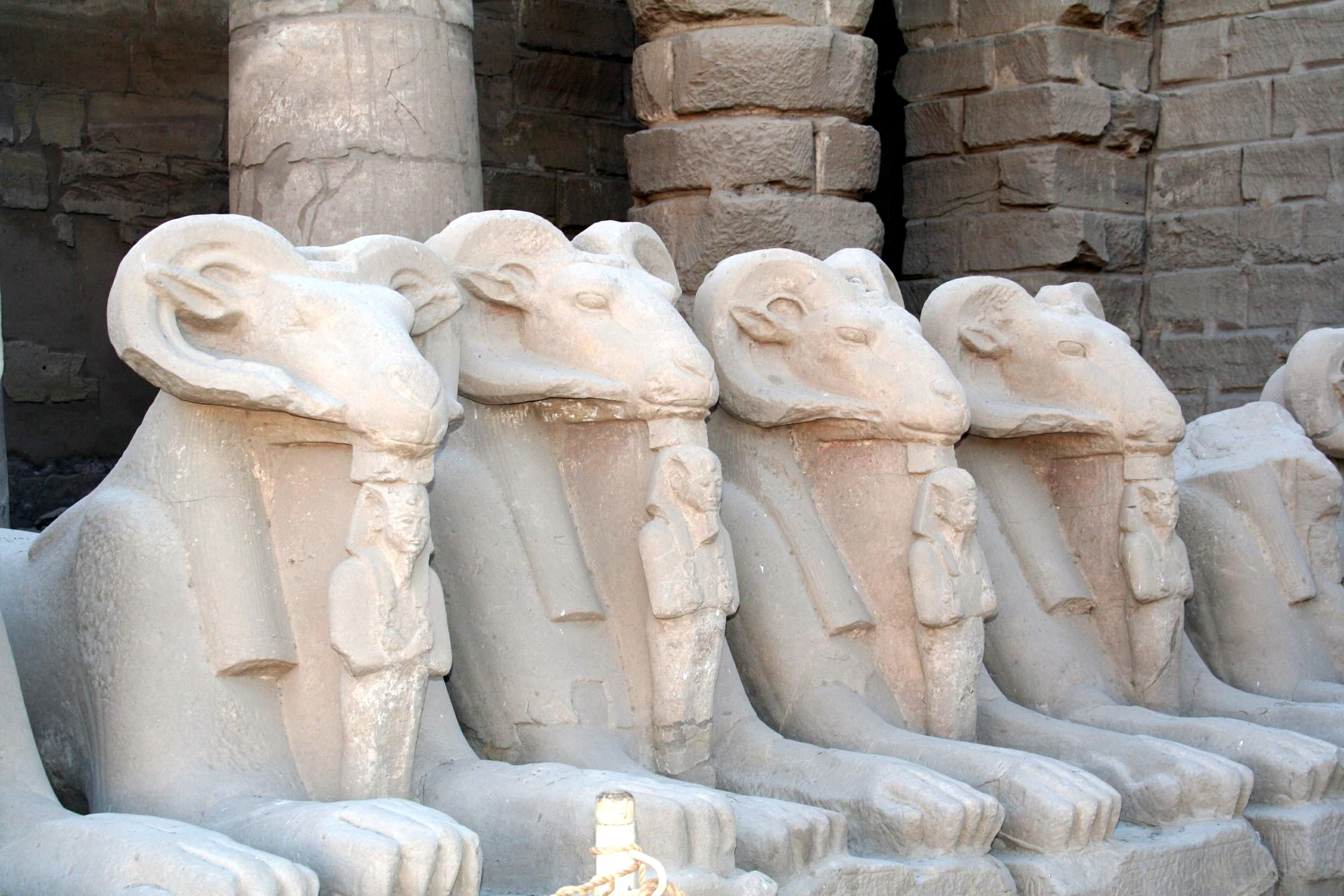
Ram statues line the entrance to Amun's Temple

Amun, the supreme Egyptian god, was often represented with a ram's head, a depiction that may have originated from other regions of North Africa since the Lithic period.

Although the most modern sources ignored the existence of Amun in the Berber mythology, he was attested to in earlier sources as a god of the Berbers. In Awelimmiden Tuareg, the name Amanai is believed to have the meaning of "God". The Ancient Libyans may have worshipped the setting sun, which was personified by Amun, who was represented by the ram's horns. The name of the ancient Berber tribes: Garamantes and Nasamonians are believed by some scholars to be related to the name Amun.

=== Nigeria ===
Adherents of Odinani worship the Ikenga, god of honest achievement, whose two horns symbolize self-will. Small wooden statues of him are made and praised as personal altars.

=== Greek ===
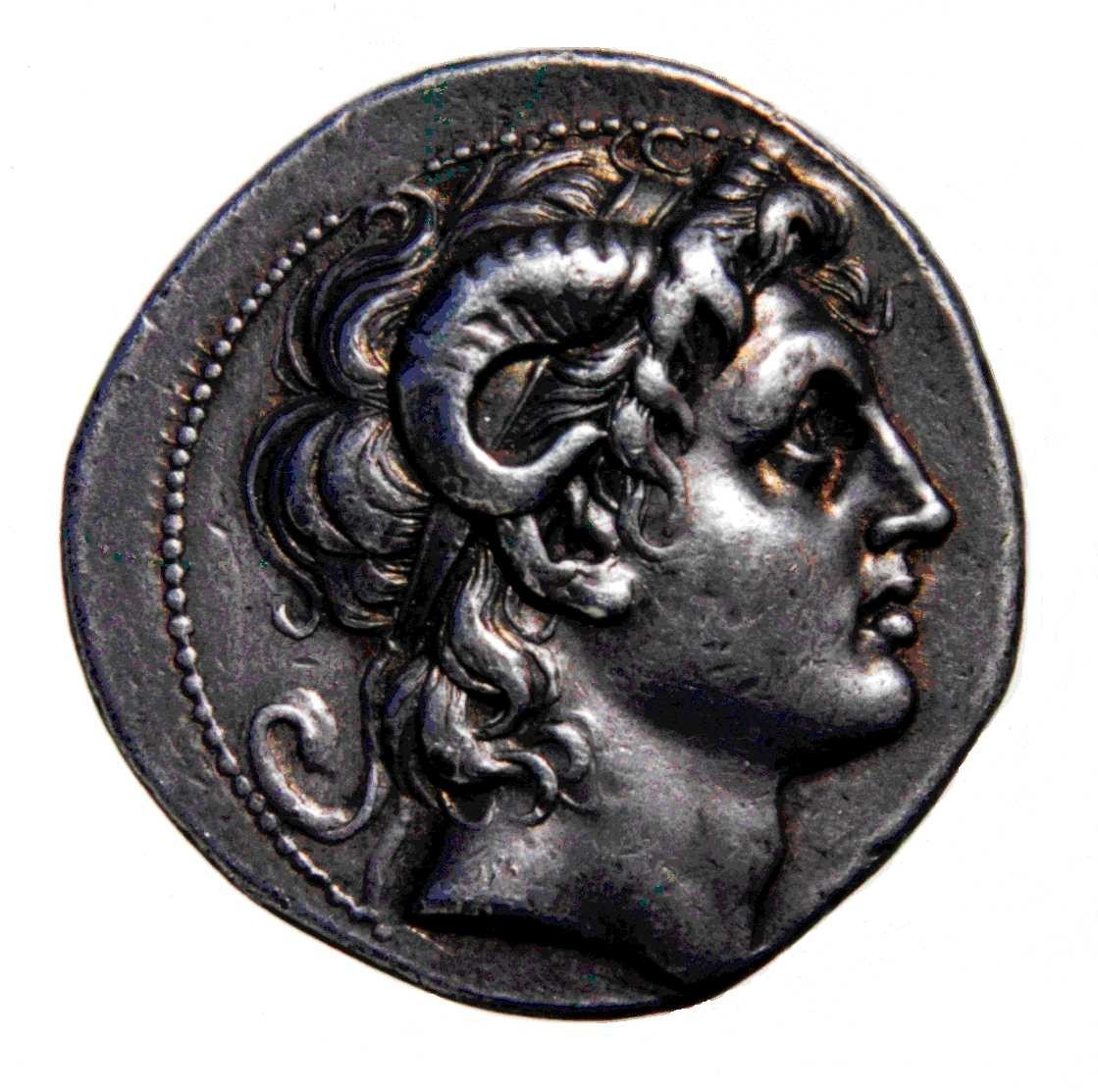
Silver tetradrachmon (ancient Greek coin) issued in the name of Alexander the Great, depicting him with horns

The cult of Amun was likely introduced to Greece early on, possibly through the Greek colony of Cyrene, and came to be venerated in cities such as Thebes, Sparta, Aphytis, Megalopolis, and Delphi. Amun was identified by these Greeks as a form of Zeus, resulting in depictions of the god with horns. According to Arrian, Curtius, Diodorus, Justin, and Plutarch, Alexander the Great visited the Oracle of Ammon at Siwa, after the battle of Issus, where he was declared the son of Amun. Alexander styled himself as the son of Zeus-Amun and even demanded to be worshiped as a god. Pan was a Greek god of shepherds and flocks, of mountain wilds and rustic music, and was depicted with the horns and hooves of a goat. The moon goddess, Selene, was also commonly described as "horned", respresenting the crescent moon and associated with the bull.

In Orphism, Zagreus, an equivalent of Dionysus, was described as "bull-faced"; possibly influencing Dionysus' epithet Tauros ("bull") and depictions of him with horns, as attested by Plutarch. In Euripides' The Bacchae, there is a scene were King Pentheus sees a horned Dionysus, resulting in him losing his sanity.

=== Roman ===
Cocidius was the name of a Romano-British war-god and local deity from the region around Hadrian's Wall, who is sometimes represented as being horned. He is associated with warfare and woodland and was worshipped mostly by military personnel and the lower classes.

=== Neopagan ===
In 1933, the Egyptologist Margaret Murray published the book, The God of the Witches, in which she theorised that Pan was merely one form of a horned god who was worshipped across many European cultures. This theory influenced the Neopagan notion of the Horned God, as an archetype of male virility and sexuality. In Wicca, the archetype of the Horned God is highly important, and is thought by believers to be represented by such deities as the Celtic Cernunnos, Indian Pashupati and Greek Pan.

Horned God in Wiccan based neopagan religions represents a solar god often associated with vegetation, that's honoured as the Holly King or Oak King in Neopagan rituals. Most often, the Horned God is considered a male fertility god. The use of horns as a symbol for power dates back to the ancient world. From ancient Egypt and the Ba'al worshipping Cannanites, to the Greeks, Romans, Celts, and various other cultures. Horns have ever been present in religious imagery as symbols of fertility and power. It was not until Christianity attributed horns to Satan as part of his iconography that horned gods became associated with evil in Western mythology:

Many modern neo-Pagans focus their worship on a horned god, or often "the" Horned God and one or more goddesses. Deities such as Pan and Dionysus have had attributes of their worship imported into the Neopagan concept as have the Celtic Cernunnos and Gwynn ap Nudd, one of the mythological leaders of the Wild Hunt.

Few neopagan reconstructionist traditions recognize Satan or the Devil outright. However, many neopagan groups worship some sort of Horned God, for example as a consort of the Great Goddess in Wicca. These gods usually reflect mythological figures such as Cernunnos or Pan, and any similarity they may have to the Christian Devil seems to date back only to the 19th century, when a Christian reaction to Pan's growing importance in literature and art resulted in his image being translated to that of the Devil.

== Influence on demonology ==
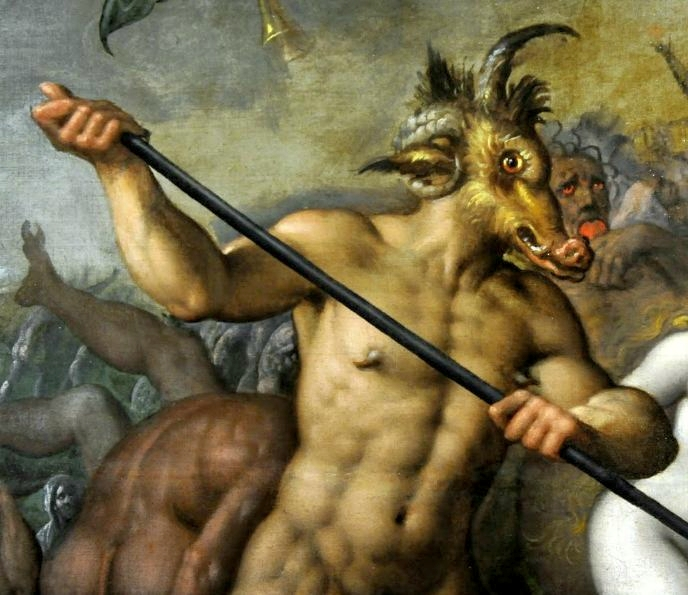
Horns of a goat and a ram; a typical depiction of the devil in Christian art (Detail of a 16th-century painting by Jacob de Backer in the National Museum in Warsaw)

=== Christian demonology ===
The idea that demons have horns seems to have been taken from the Book of Revelation chapter 13. The book of Revelation seems to have inspired many depictions of demons. This idea has also been associated with the depiction of certain ancient gods like Moloch and the shedu, etc., which were portrayed as bulls, as men with the head of a bull, or wearing bull horns as a crown.

=== Baphomet of Mendes ===
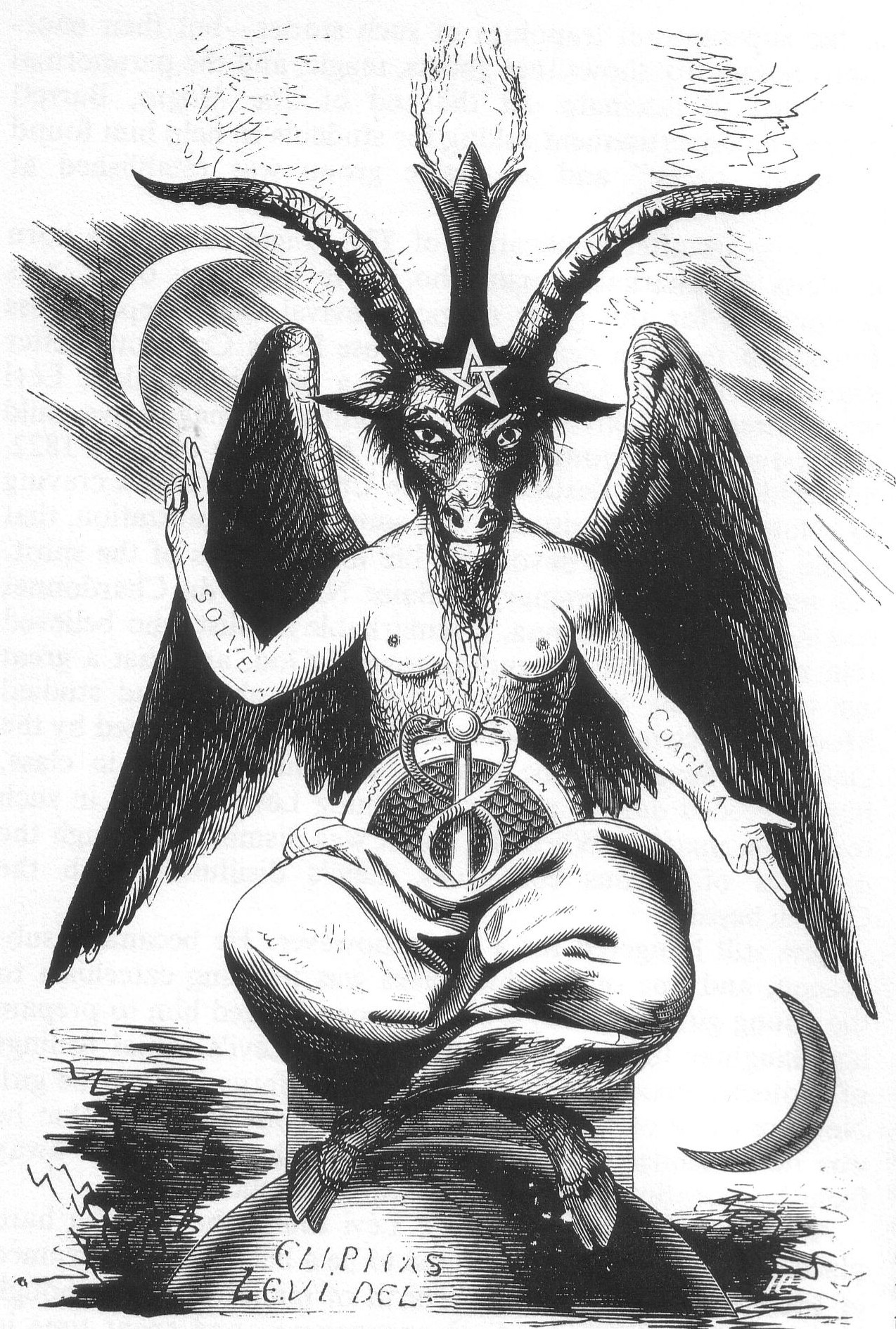
Image of a 19th-century Sabbatic Goat

The satanic "horned god" symbol known as the baphomet is based on an Egyptian ram deity that was worshipped in Mendes, called Banebdjed (literally Ba of the lord of djed, and titled "the Lord of Mendes"), who was the soul of Osiris. According to Egyptian Mythology: A Guide to the Gods, Goddesses, and Traditions of ancient Egypt, the book's author Geraldine Harris, said the ram gods Ra-Amun (see: Cult of Ammon), and Banebdjed, were to mystically unite with the queen of Egypt to sire the heir to the throne (a theory based on depictions found in several Theban temples in Mendes).

Occultist Eliphas Levi in his Dogme et Rituel de la Haute Magie (1855), combined the images of the Tarot of Marseilles' Devil card and refigured the ram Banebdjed as a he-goat, calling it the "Baphomet of Mendes," (or, "Goat of Mendes"). The inaccurate description can be traced back to Herodotus' Histories Book II, where Herodotus describes the deity of Mendes as having a goat's head and fleece, when Banebdjedet was really represented by a ram, not a goat.

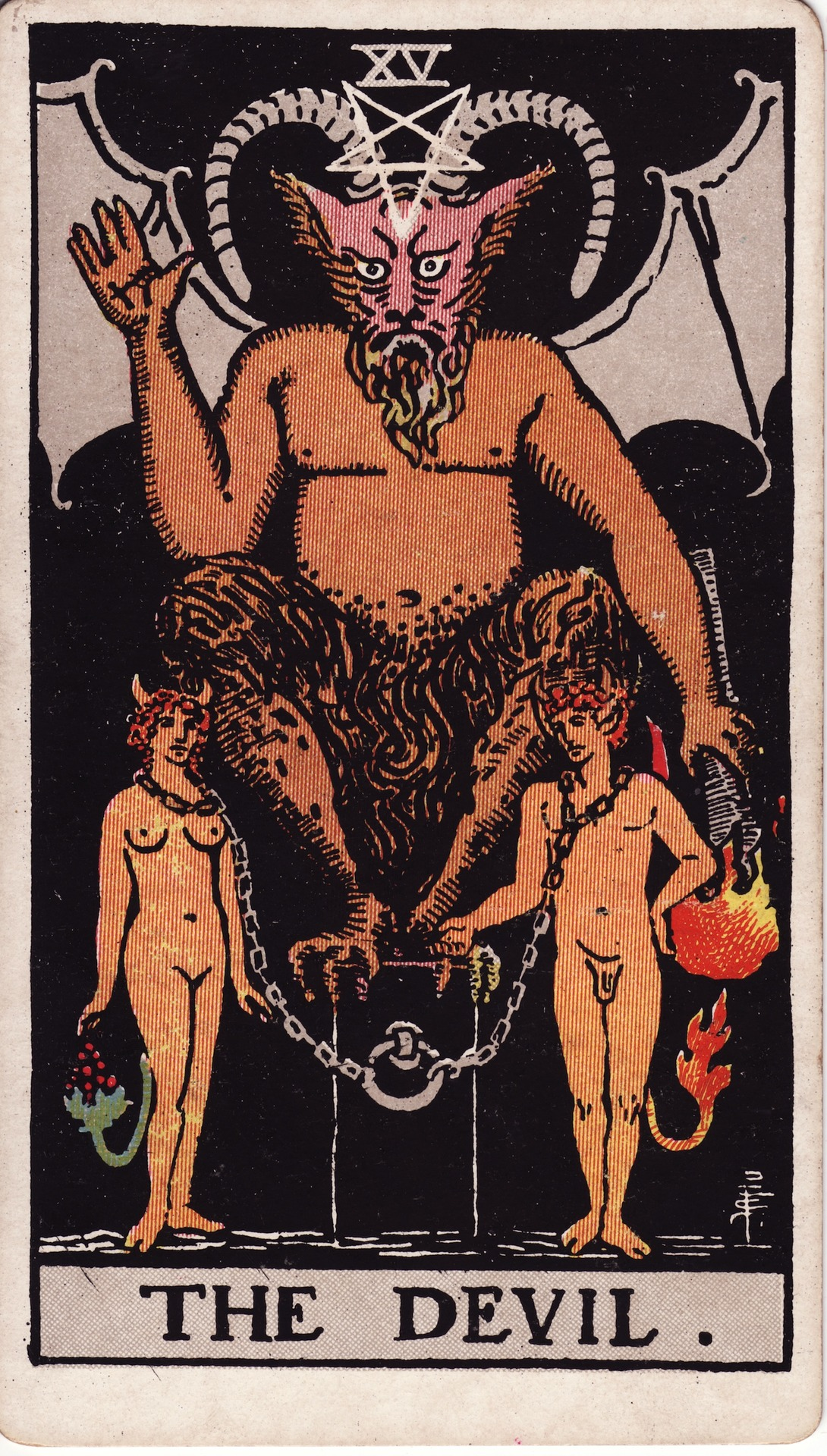
The Devil in the Rider–Waite Tarot deck

The Baphomet of Lévi was to become an important figure within the cosmology of Thelema, the mystical system established by Aleister Crowley in the early twentieth century. Baphomet features in the Creed of the Gnostic Catholic Church recited by the congregation in The Gnostic Mass, in the sentence: "And I believe in the Serpent and the Lion, Mystery of Mystery, in His name BAPHOMET" (see: Aleister Crowley: Occult).

Lévi's Baphomet is the source of the later Tarot image of the Devil in the Rider–Waite design. The concept of a downward-pointing pentagram on its forehead was enlarged upon by Lévi in his discussion (without illustration) of the Goat of Mendes arranged within such a pentagram, which he contrasted with the microcosmic man arranged within a similar but upright pentagram. The actual image of a goat in a downward-pointing pentagram first appeared in the 1897 book La Clef de la Magie Noire by Stanislas de Guaita, later adopted as the official symbol—called the Sigil of Baphomet—of the Church of Satan, and continues to be used among Satanists.

=== Witch-cult hypothesis ===
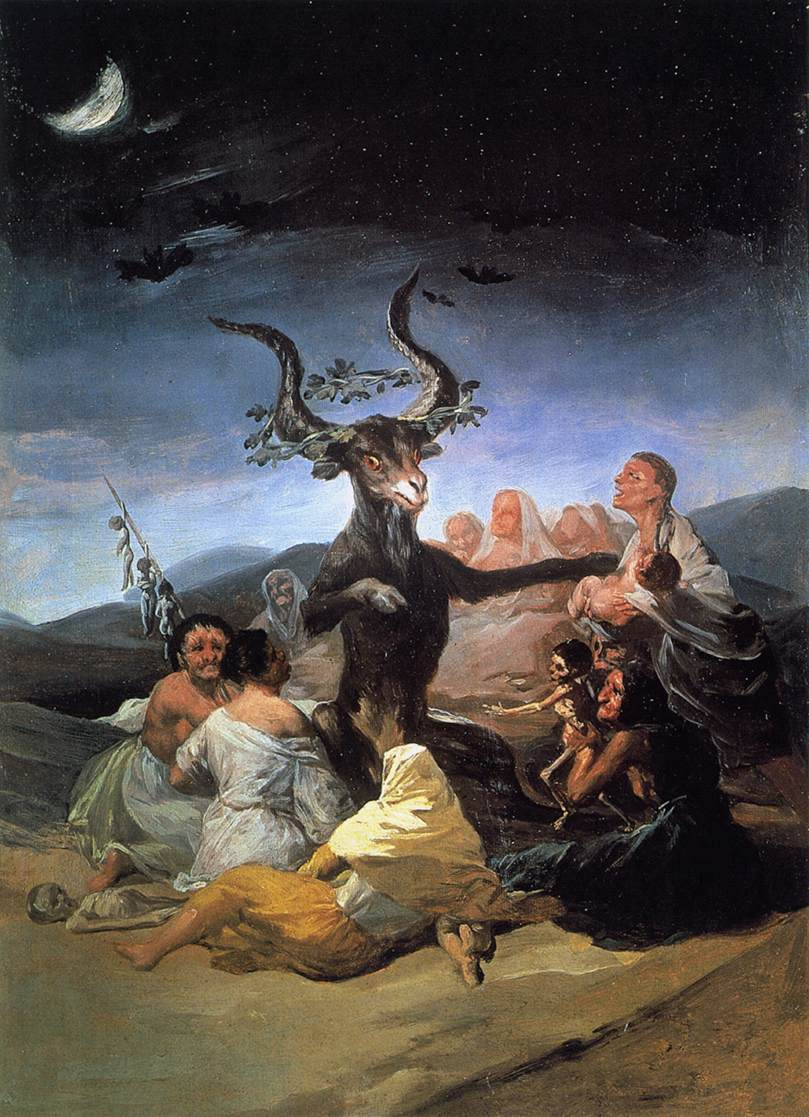
Francisco de Goya's Witches Sabbat (1789), which depicts the Devil flanked by Satanic witches. The Witch Cult hypothesis states that such stories are based upon a real-life pagan cult that revered a horned god

In 1985 Classical historian Georg Luck, in his Arcana Mundi: Magic and the Occult in the Greek and Roman Worlds, theorised that the origins of the Witch-cult may have appeared in late antiquity as a faith primarily designed to worship the Horned God, stemming from the merging of Cernunnos, a horned god of the Celts, with the Greco-Roman Pan/Faunus, a combination of gods which he posits created a new deity, around which the remaining pagans, those refusing to convert to Christianity, rallied and that this deity provided the prototype for later Christian conceptions of the Devil, and his worshippers were cast by the Church as witches.

=== Beelzebub ===
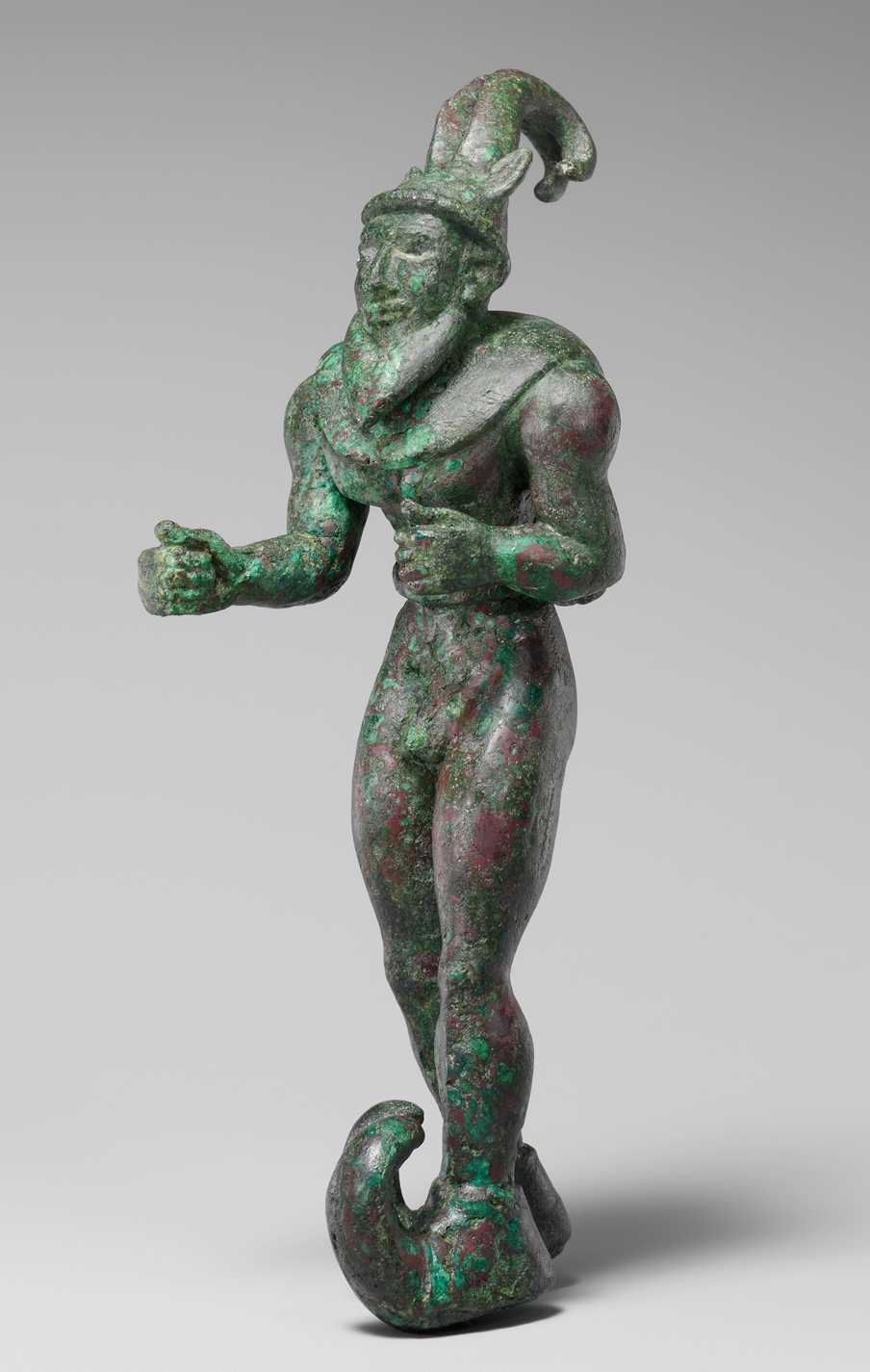
Striding figure with ibex horns, a raptor skin draped around the shoulders, and upturned boots, c. 3000 BC, Mesopotamia or Iran, Metropolitan Museum of Art

There is an implied connection between Satan and Beelzebub (lit. Lord of the Flies), originally a Semitic deity called Baal (lit. "lord"). Beelzebub is the most recognized demon in the Bible, whose name has become analogous to Satan. Occult and metaphysical author Michelle Belanger believes that Beelzebub (a mockery of the original name) is the horned god Ba'al Hadad, whose cult symbol was the bull. According to The Encyclopedia of Witches, Witchcraft and Wicca, Beelzebub reigned over the Witches' Sabbath ("synagoga"), and that witches denied Christ in his name and chanted "Beelzebub" as they danced.

Beelzebub was also imagined to be sowing his influence in Salem, Massachusetts: his name came up repeatedly during the Salem witch trials, the last large-scale public expression of witch hysteria in North America or Europe, and afterwards Rev. Cotton Mather wrote a pamphlet entitled Of Beelzebub and his Plot.

=== Moloch ===
Moloch was, according to the Bible, a Canaanite deity often depicted as a bull, and became a bull demon in Abrahamic traditions.

== See also ==
- Bull (mythology)
- Cattle in religion and mythology
- Deer in mythology
- Golden calf
- Horned Serpent
