= The Sorcerer (cave art) =

Cave painting at the Cave of the Trois-Frères, Ariège, France

Coordinates: 43°1′52″N 1°12′30″E

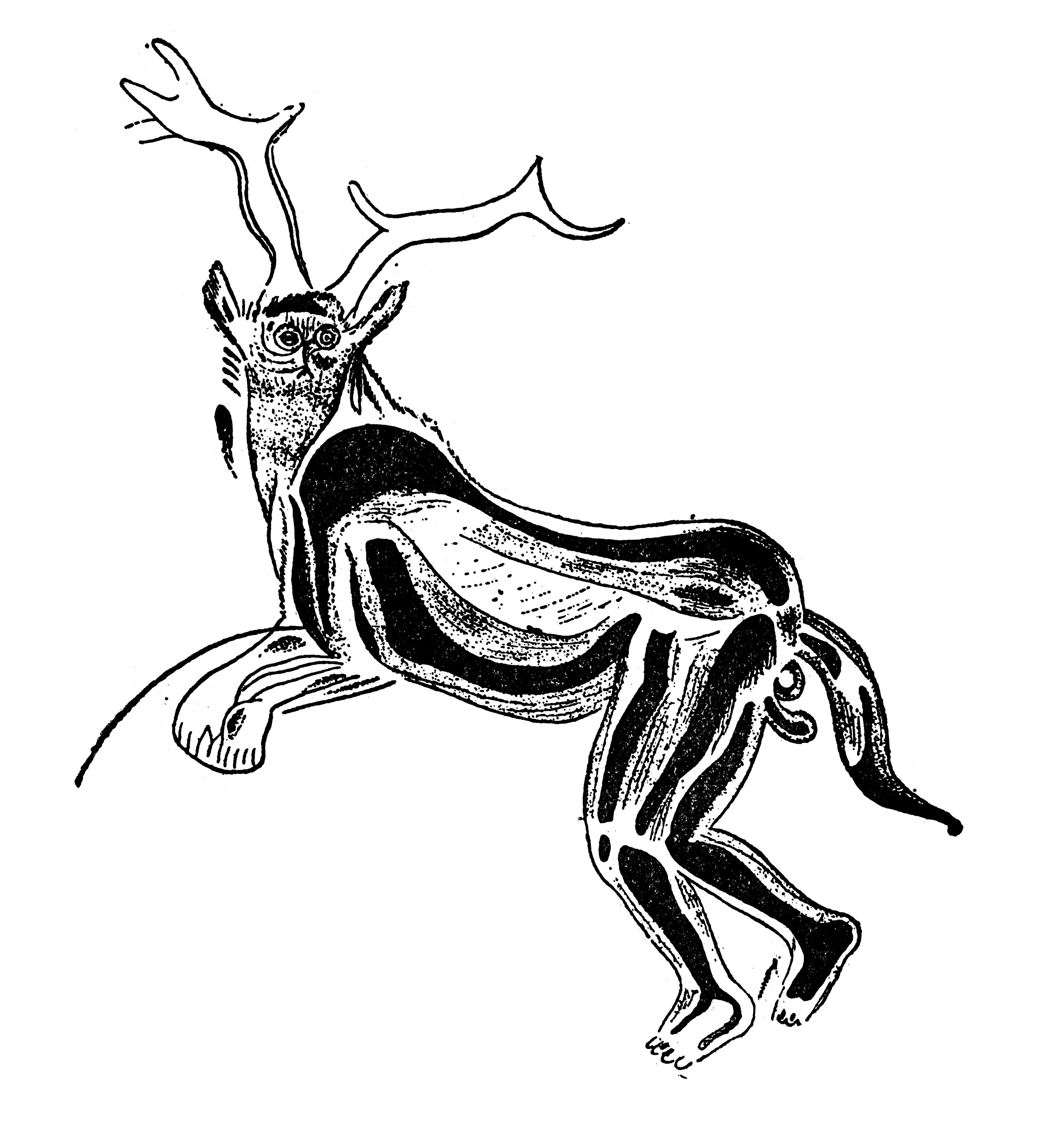
Sketch of Breuil's drawing

The Sorcerer is a figure depicted on an Upper Paleolithic cave painting found in the Sanctuary at the Cave of the Trois-Frères in Ariège, France. The date of its creation has been estimated around 13,000 BCE. The figure's significance is unknown, but has been interpreted as a shamanic "great spirit" or master of animals. The unusual nature of the Sanctuary's decoration may also reflect the practice of magical ceremonies in the chamber. A single prominent human figure is unusual in the cave paintings of the Upper Paleolithic, where the great majority of representations are of animals.

In his sketches of the cave art, Henri Breuil drew a horned humanoid torso and the publication of this drawing in the 1920s influenced many subsequent theories about the figure. However, the accuracy of Breuil's sketch has also come under significant criticism in recent years.

== Interpretations ==
Henri Breuil asserted that the cave painting represented a shaman or magician — an interpretation which gives the image its name — and described the image he drew in these terms.

Margaret Murray, having seen the published drawing, called Breuil's image 'the first depiction of a deity on Earth', an idea which Breuil and others later adopted. His views held sway in the field for much of the 20th century, but they have since been largely superseded.

Breuil's image has been commonly interpreted as a shaman performing a ritual to ensure good hunting.

S. G. F. Brandon expressed in 1959: "it seems to be generally agreed that this picture of the 'Dancing Sorcerer' was a cult object of great significance to the community which used the cave."

== Critique ==
Certain modern scholars question the validity of Breuil's sketch, claiming that modern photographs do not show the famous antlers. Ronald Hutton theorized that Breuil was fitting the evidence to support his hunting-magic theory of cave-art, citing that "the figure drawn by Breuil is not the same as the one actually painted on the cave wall." Hutton's theory led him to conclude that reliance on Breuil's initial sketch resulted in many later scholars erroneously claiming that "The Sorcerer" was evidence that the concept of a Horned God dated back to Paleolithic times.

"The Sorcerer" is composed of both charcoal drawings and etching within the stone itself; details, such as etching, are often difficult to view from photographs due to their size and the quality of the light source. Prehistorian Jean Clottes has asserted that Breuil's sketch is accurate, saying "I have seen it myself perhaps 20 times over the years", although he has not provided definitive evidence.

== Popular culture ==
Breuil's interpretation of the drawing as a shaman strongly influenced writer Pat Mills in the creation of the Lord Weird Slough Feg, an early antagonist in the Slaine comic strip.

The 1996 novel The Story of B by Daniel Quinn includes an interpretation of the painting as an expression of late Paleolithic animism, a symbol for the human sense of identity with other animal life.

In Sunset of the Sabertooth, a 1996 installment of the Magic Tree House children's book series, the Sorcerer is depicted as a shaman-like traveler who rescues the protagonists, Jack and Annie, and helps take them home.

== See also ==
- Cernunnos
- Horned deity
- Naigamesha
- Reindeer in Siberian shamanism
- Satyr
- Shamanism: Archaic Techniques of Ecstasy
