= Wiccan views of divinity =

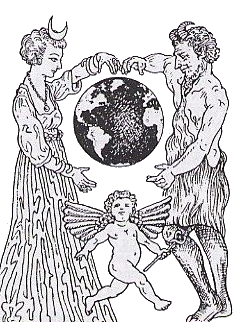
The divine couple in Wicca, with the Lady as Hecate, the witchcraft goddess, and the Lord as Pan, the horned god of the wild Earth. The lower figure is Mercury or Hermes, the god or divine force of magic - as shown by his wings and caduceus.

Wiccan views of divinity are generally theistic and revolve around a Goddess and a Horned God, thereby being generally dualistic. In traditional Wicca, as expressed in the writings of Gerald Gardner and Doreen Valiente, the emphasis is on the theme of divine gender polarity, and the God and Goddess are regarded as equal and opposite divine cosmic forces. In some newer forms of Wicca, such as feminist or Dianic Wicca, the Goddess is given primacy or even exclusivity. In some forms of traditional witchcraft that share a similar duotheistic theology, the Horned God is given precedence over the Goddess.

Some Wiccans are polytheists, believing in many different deities taken from various Pagan pantheons, while others would believe that, in the words of Dion Fortune, "all the Goddesses are one Goddess, and all the Gods one God". Some Wiccans are both duotheistic and polytheistic (and sometimes a combination of duotheism, polytheism, and pantheism) in that they honor diverse pagan deities while reserving their worship for the Wiccan Goddess and Horned God, whom they regard as the supreme deities. (This approach is not dissimilar to ancient pagan pantheons where one divine couple, a god and goddess, were seen as the supreme deities of an entire pantheon.) Some see divinity as having a real, external existence; others see the Goddesses and Gods as archetypes or thoughtforms within the collective consciousness.

According to several 20th-century witches, most notably Gerald Gardner, the "father of Wicca", the witches' God and Goddess are the ancient gods of the British Isles: a Horned God of hunting, death, and magic who rules over an after-world paradise (often referred to as the Summerland), and a goddess, the Great Mother (who is simultaneously the Eternal Virgin and the Primordial Enchantress), who gives regeneration and rebirth to souls of the dead and love to the living. The Goddess is especially connected to the Moon and stars and the sea, while the Horned God is connected to the Sun and the forests. Gardner explains that these are the tribal gods of the witches, just as the Egyptians had their tribal gods Isis and Osiris and the Jews had Elohim; he also states that a being higher than any of these tribal gods is recognised by the witches as Prime Mover, but remains unknowable, and is of little concern to them.

The Goddess is often seen as having a triple aspect: that of the maiden, mother, and crone. The God is traditionally seen as being the Horned God of the woods. A key belief in Wicca is that the gods can manifest in personal form through dreams, physical manifestations, or the bodies of Priestesses and Priests. Both deities are connected to all religions.

Gardnerian Wicca as a denomination is primarily concerned with the priestess or priest's relationship to the Goddess and God. The Lady and Lord (as they are often called) are seen as primordial, cosmic beings, the source of limitless power, yet they are also familiar figures who comfort and nurture their children and often challenge or even reprimand them.

== Dualism ==
Wiccan theology largely revolves around an ontological dualism consisting of a God and a Goddess. Ontological dualism is traditionally a sacred gender polarity between the complementary polar opposites of male and female, who are regarded as divine lovers. This kind of dualism is common to various religions; for example, Taoism, where it is represented through yin and yang. Ontological dualism is distinct from moral dualism in that moral dualism posits a supreme force of good and a supreme force of evil. There is no supreme force of evil in Wicca.

For most Wiccans, the Lord and Lady are seen as complementary polarities: male and female, force and form, comprehending all in their union; the tension and interplay between them is the basis of all creation, and this balance is seen in much of nature. The God and Goddess are sometimes symbolised as the Sun and Moon, and from her lunar associations the Goddess becomes a Triple Goddess with aspects of "Maiden", "Mother" and "Crone" corresponding to the Moon's waxing, full and waning phases.

A key belief in Wicca is that the gods are able to manifest in personal form, either through dreams, as physical manifestations, or through the bodies of Priestesses and Priests. The latter kind of manifestation is the purpose of the ritual of Drawing down the Moon (or Drawing down the Sun), whereby the Goddess is called to descend into the body of the Priestess (or the God into the Priest) to effect divine possession.

According to current Gardnerian Wiccans, the exact names of the Goddess and God of traditional Wicca remain an initiatory secret, and they are not given in Gardner's books about witchcraft. However, the collection of Toronto Papers of Gardner's writings has been investigated by American scholars such as Aidan Kelly, leading to the suggestion that their names are Cernunnos and Aradia. These are the names used in the prototype Book of Shadows known as Ye Bok of Ye Arte Magical.

=== The God ===
In Wicca, the God is seen as the masculine form of divinity, and the polar opposite, and equal, to the Goddess.

The God is traditionally seen as the Horned God, an archetypal deity with links to the Celtic Cernunnos, English folkloric Herne the Hunter, Greek Pan, Roman Faunus and Indian Pashupati. This was the God whom Gerald Gardner presented as the old God of the ancient Witches, and who was supported by Margaret Murray's theory of the pan-European witch religion, which has largely been discredited. Horns are traditionally a sacred symbol of male virility, and male gods with horns or antlers were common in pagan religious iconography throughout the ancient world.

In Wicca, the Green Man is also often associated with the Horned God, though he does not always have horns.

At different times of the Wiccan year the God is seen as different personalities. He is sometimes seen as the Oak King and the Holly King, who each rule for half of the year each. Oak and Holly are two European trees. Another view of the God is that of the sun god, who is particularly revered at the sabbat of Lughnasadh. Many Wiccans see these many facets, such as the sun god, horned god, sacrificial god, as all aspects of the same God, but a minority view them as separate polytheistic deities.

The most exhaustive work on Wiccan ideas of the God is the book The Witches' God by Janet and Stewart Farrar.

Triple Goddess symbol of waxing, full and waning moon

=== The Goddess ===
Traditionally in Wicca, the Goddess is seen as the Triple Goddess, meaning that she is the maiden, the mother and the crone. The mother aspect, the Mother Goddess, is perhaps the most important of these, and it was her that Gerald Gardner and Margaret Murray claimed was the ancient Goddess of the witches.

Certain Wiccan traditions are Goddess-centric; this view differs from most traditions in that most others focus on a duality of goddess and god.

=== Interpretations ===
Gardner's explanation aside, individual interpretations of the exact natures of the gods differ significantly, since priests and priestesses develop their own relationships with the gods through intense personal work and revelation. Many have a duotheistic conception of deity as a Goddess (of Moon, Earth and sea) and a God (of forest, hunting and the animal realm). This concept is often extended into a kind of polytheism by the belief that the gods and goddesses of all cultures are aspects of this pair (or of the Goddess alone). Others hold the various gods and goddesses to be separate and distinct. Janet Farrar and Gavin Bone have observed that Wicca is becoming more polytheistic as it matures, and embracing a more traditional pagan worldview. Many groups and individuals are drawn to particular deities from a variety of pantheons (often Celtic, Greek, or from elsewhere in Europe), whom they honour specifically. Some examples are Cernunnos and Brigit from Celtic mythology, Hecate, Lugh, and Diana.

Still others do not believe in the gods as real personalities, yet attempt to have a relationship with them as personifications of universal principles or as Jungian archetypes. Some Wiccans conceive deities as akin to thoughtforms.

== Monism ==
In addition to the two main deities worshiped within Wicca—the God and Goddess—there are also several possible theological conceptions of an ultimate (impersonal) pantheistic or monistic divinity, known variously as Dryghtyn or "the One" or "The All." This ultimate divinity or pantheist god can also be seen under the name of Cybele, the mother goddess viewed as both feminine and masculine. This impersonal ultimate divinity is generally regarded as unknowable, and is acknowledged but not worshiped. This monistic idea of an ultimate impersonal divinity is not to be confused with the monotheistic idea of a single supreme personal deity. (Especially since Wicca traditionally honors its two supreme deities, the Goddess and the God, as equal.) This impersonal ultimate divinity may also be regarded as the underlying order or organising principle within the world, similar to religious ideas such as the Tao and Brahman. While not all Wiccans subscribe to this monistic idea of an impersonal, ultimate divinity, many do; and there are various philosophical constructions of how this ultimate divinity relates to the physical world of Nature.

=== Star Goddess ===
Some Wiccans hold the Goddess to be pre-eminent, since she contains and conceives all (Gaea or Mother Earth is one of her more commonly revered aspects). The name Star Goddess is used by certain feminist Wiccans such as Starhawk to describe this universal, pantheistic creator deity. They regard Her as a knowable Deity that can and should be worshipped. Contrary to the popular notion that the term "Star Goddess" comes from the Charge of the Goddess, a text sacred to many Wiccans, it actually originates from the Anderson Feri Tradition of (non-Wiccan) Witchcraft- of which Starhawk was an initiate. Within the Feri tradition the "Star Goddess" is the androgynous point of all creation - from which all things (including the dual God and Goddess) emanate.

In this Goddess-centric view, the God, commonly described as the Horned God or the Divine Child, is the spark of life and inspiration within her, simultaneously her lover and her child. This is reflected in the traditional structure of the coven, wherein "the High Priestess is the leader, with the High Priest as her partner; he acknowledges her primacy and supports and complements her leadership with the qualities of his own polarity." In some traditions, notably Feminist branches of Dianic Wicca, the Goddess is seen as complete unto herself, and the God is not worshipped at all.

Since the Goddess is said to conceive and contain all life within her, all beings are held to be divine. The traditional Charge of the Goddess—the most widely shared piece of liturgy within the religion refers to the Goddess as "the Soul of Nature" from whom all things come, and to which all things return. This theme is also expressed in the symbology of the magic cauldron as the womb of the Goddess, from which all creation emerges, and in which it is all dissolved before reemerging again, and is very similar to the Hermetic understanding that "God" contains all things, and in truth is all things. For some Wiccans, this idea also involves elements of animism, and plants, rivers, rocks (and, importantly, ritual tools) are seen as spiritual beings, facets of a single life. As such, Wicca emphasises the immanence of divinity within Nature, seeing the natural world as comprised both of spiritual substance as well as matter and physical energy.

==== The Goddess as a pantheistic entity ====
In addition to the pantheistic view of Nature as a divinity in itself expressed as the Goddess, some Wiccans also embrace the idea of the spiritual transcendence of divinity, and see this transcendence as compatible with the idea of immanence. In such a view, divinity and dimensions of spiritual existence (sometimes called "the astral planes") can exist outside the physical world, as well as extending into the material, and/or rising out of the material, intimately interwoven into the fabric of material existence in such a way that the spiritual affects the physical, and vice versa. (The conception of Nature as a vast, interconnected web of existence that the Goddess weaves is very common within Wicca; an idea often connected with the Triple Goddess as personified by the Three Fates who weave the Web of Wyrd.) This combination of transcendence and immanence allows for the intermingling and the interaction of the unmanifest spiritual nature of the universe with the manifest physical universe; the physical reflects the spiritual, and vice versa. (An idea expressed in the occult maxim "As Above, So Below" which is also used within Wicca.)

=== Other godheads ===
Dryghten, an Old English term for The Lord, is the term used by Patricia Crowther to refer to the universal pantheistic deity in Wicca. Gerald Gardner had initially called it, according to the cosmological argument, the Prime Mover, a term borrowed from Aristotle, but he claimed that the witches did not worship it, and considered it unknowable. It was referred to by Scott Cunningham by the term used in Neo-Platonism, "The One"; Many Wiccans whose practice involves study of the Kabbalah also regard the Gods and Goddesses they worship as being aspects or expressions of the ineffable supreme One.

== Other views on divinity ==
Given the usual interpretation of Wicca as a pantheistic and duotheistic/polytheistic religion, the monotheistic belief in a single "supreme deity" does not generally apply. An individual Wiccan's personal devotion may be centered on the traditional Horned God and the Moon Goddess of Wicca, a large number of divine "aspects" of the Wiccan God and Goddess, a large pantheon of individual pagan Gods, one specific pagan God and one specific pagan Goddess, or any combination of those perspectives. Accordingly, the religion of Wicca can be understood as duotheistic, henotheistic, pantheistic, polytheistic, or panentheistic depending upon the personal faith, cosmological belief, and philosophy of the individual Wiccan.

== The elements ==
While they are not regarded as deities, the classical elements are a featured key of the Wiccan world-view. Every manifest force or form is seen to express one of the four archetypal elements — Earth, Air, Fire and Water — or several in combination. This scheme is fundamentally identical with that employed in other Western Esoteric and Hermetic traditions, such as Theosophy and the Golden Dawn, which in turn were influenced by the Hindu system of tattvas.

There is no consensus as to the exact nature of these elements. One popular system is the ancient Greek conception, where the elements correspond to matter (earth) and energy (fire), with the mediating elements (water, air) relating to the phases of matter (fire/earth mixtures). A more modern conception correlates the four elements to the four states of matter known to science: Solid (earth); Liquid (water); Gas (air); and Plasma (fire); with the akasha element corresponding to pure Energy. The Aristotelian system proposes a fifth or quintessential element, spirit (aether, akasha). The preferred version is a matter of ongoing dispute in the Wiccan community. There are other non-scientific conceptions, but they are not widely used among Wiccans.

To some Wiccans, the five points of the frequently worn pentagram symbolize, among other things, the four elements with spirit presiding at the top. The pentagram is the symbol most commonly associated with Wicca in modern times. It is often circumscribed — depicted within a circle — and is usually (though not exclusively) shown with a single point upward. The inverse pentagram, with two points up, is associated with the Horned God (the two upper points being his horns), and is a symbol of the second degree initiation rite of traditional Wicca. The inverted pentagram is also used by Satanists; and for this reason, some Wiccans have alternatively been known to associate the inverted pentagram with evil. In geometry, the pentagram is an elegant expression of the golden ratio phi which is popularly connected with ideal beauty and was considered by the Pythagoreans to express truths about the hidden nature of existence. The five points of the pentagram have also been seen to correspond to the three aspects of the Goddess and the two aspects of the Horned God.

In the casting of a magic circle, the four cardinal elements are visualised as contributing their influence from the four cardinal directions: Air in the east, Fire in the south, Water in the west and Earth in the north. There may be variations between groups though, particularly in the Southern Hemisphere, since these attributions are symbolic of (amongst other things) the path of the sun through the daytime sky. For example, in southern latitudes the sun reaches its hottest point in the northern part of the sky, and north is the direction of the Tropics, so this is commonly the direction given to Fire.

Some Wiccan groups also modify the religious calendar (the Wheel of the Year) to reflect local seasonal changes; for instance, most Southern Hemisphere covens celebrate Samhain on April 30 and Beltane on November 1, reflecting the southern hemisphere's autumn and spring seasons.

== See also ==
- Classical elements
- Great Rite
- Magic (paranormal)
- Neopaganism
- New Age
- The Summerland
- Three-fold Law
- Wiccan Rede
- Witchcraft
