= The Devil (tarot card) =

Tarot card of the Major Arcana

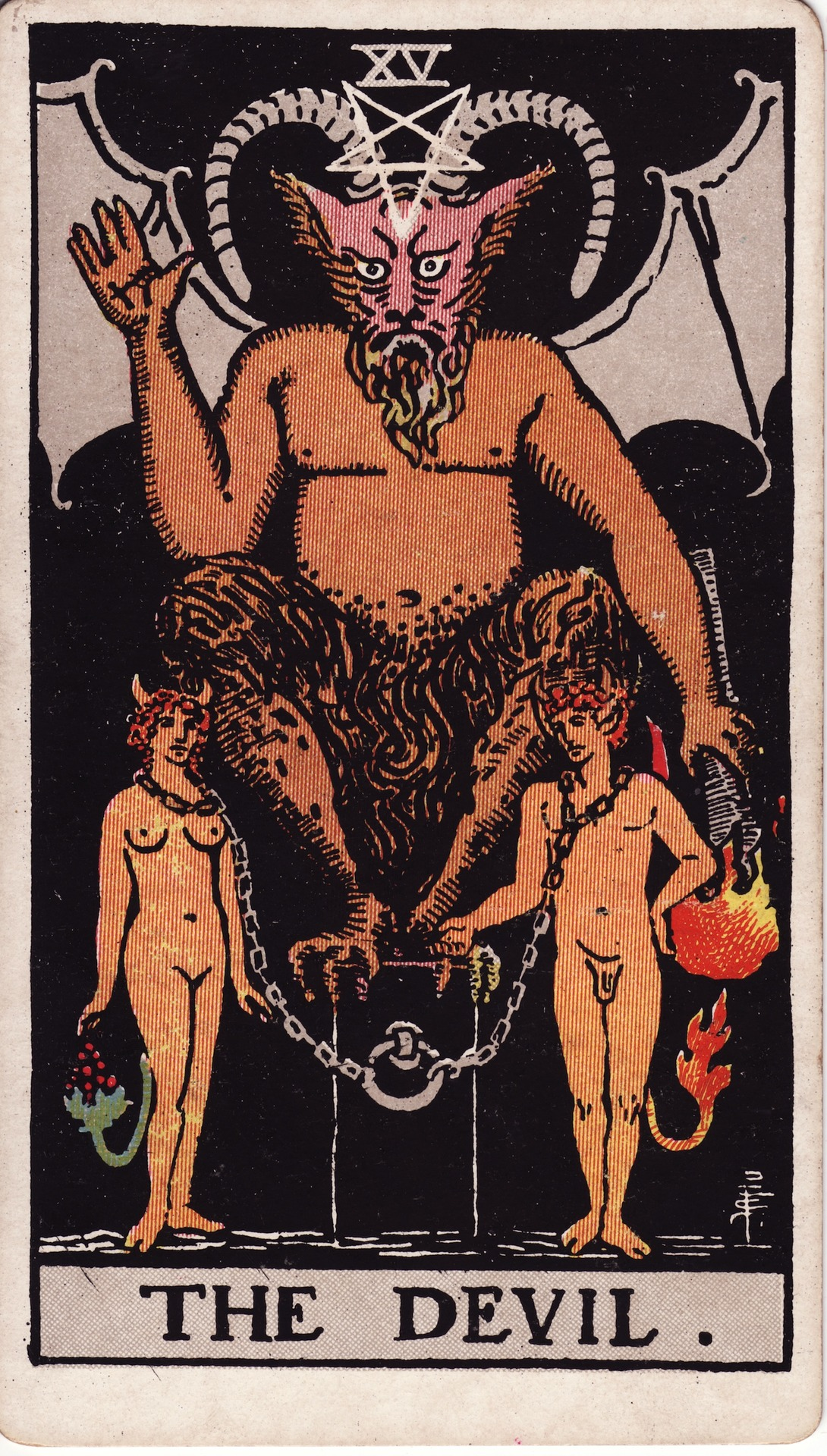
The Devil (XV) from the Rider–Waite tarot deck

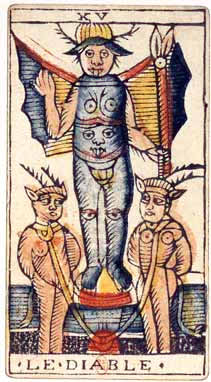
Le Diable, from the early eighteenth century Tarot of Marseilles by Jean Dodal.

The Devil (XV) is the fifteenth trump or Major Arcana card in most traditional tarot decks. It is used in game playing as well as in divination.

== Symbolism ==
According to A. E. Waite's 1910 book, The Pictorial Key to the Tarot, the Devil card carries several divinatory associations:

15. THE DEVIL.—Ravage, violence, vehemence, extraordinary efforts, force, fatality; that which is predestined but is not for this reason evil. Reversed: Evil fatality, weakness, pettiness, blindness.

In the Rider–Waite–Smith deck, the Devil is derived in part from Eliphas Levi's famous illustration "Baphomet" in his Dogme et Rituel de la Haute Magie (1855). In the Rider–Waite–Smith deck, the Devil has harpy feet, ram horns, bat wings, a reversed pentagram on the forehead, a raised right hand and a lowered left hand holding a torch. He squats on a square pedestal. Two naked demons (one male, one female) with tails stand chained to the pedestal. Levi's Baphomet has angel wings, goat horns, a raised right hand, lowered left hand, breasts and a torch on his head, and also combines human and bestial features. Many modern tarot decks portray the Devil as a satyr-like creature. According to Waite, the Devil is standing on an altar.

In pre–Eliphas Levi tarot decks like the Tarot of Marseille, the devil is portrayed with breasts, a face on the belly, eyes on the knees, lion feet and male genitalia. He also has bat-like wings, antlers, a raised right hand, a lowered left hand and a staff. Two creatures with antlers, hooves and tails are bound to his round pedestal.

The Devil card is associated with the planet Saturn, and the correlating zodiac Earth sign, Capricorn.

== Major Arcana journey ==
The Major Arcana cards tell a story called the Fool's journey, beginning from The Fool (0) and ending with The World (XXI). The Devil comes after the fourteenth Major Arcana card, Temperance. The Devil represents the Fool's involvement in economic materialism and complacency.
