= The Summerland =

Afterlife realm in various pagan religions

The Summerland is the name given by Spiritualists, Wiccans, and other contemporary pagan religions to their conceptualization of an afterlife.

== Spiritualism ==
Emanuel Swedenborg (1688–1772) inspired Andrew Jackson Davis (1826–1910), in his major work The Great Harmonia, to say that Summerland is the pinnacle of human spiritual achievement in the afterlife; that is, it is the highest level, or 'sphere', of the afterlife we can hope to enter. Summerland was a secular concept, which was appealing to some non-religious spiritualists.

== Neo-Theosophy ==
In Neo-Theosophy, the term "Summerland" is used without the definite article "the". Summerland, also called the Astral plane Heaven, is depicted as where souls who have been good in their previous lives go between incarnations.

C.W. Leadbeater, a Theosophist, also taught that those who were good in their previous earthly incarnation went to a place called Summerland between incarnations.

== See also ==
- Aaru
- Bardo
- Happy hunting ground
- Otherworld
