= Georg Luck =

Classical philologist (1926–2013)

Georg Hans Bhawani Luck
- Born: February 17, 1926; Bern, Switzerland
- Died: February 17, 2013 (aged 87); Towson, Maryland, U.S.
- Occupation: Classical scholar

Georg Hans Bhawani Luck (February 17, 1926 – February 17, 2013) was a Swiss classicist known for his studies of magical beliefs and practices in the Classical world. For over twenty years he was a professor at the Johns Hopkins University in Baltimore, Maryland.

In a scholarly debate in the late 1980s concerning methodology in the classics, Luck was a leader on the side of traditional rigorous scholarly methods and against what he viewed as unfounded speculation based on multiculturalism.

== Education and academic career ==
Luck was born in Bern, Switzerland, and attended the Kirchenfeld Gymnasium (high school) in Bern. During and after World War II, he served in the Swiss Army, eventually being promoted to lieutenant. After this, he earned a bachelor's degree from the University of Bern, also with studies at the University of Paris. He came to the U.S. for graduate studies, at Harvard University, where he earned a master's degree in classics in 1951. Returning to the University of Bern, he earned a doctorate in 1953. He was awarded a Guggenheim in 1958.

He taught classics at Yale University in 1952 and at Brown University in 1953 and 1954. Next, he taught at Harvard from 1955 to 1958, and the University of Mainz from 1958 to 1962. He became a full professor at the University of Bonn, and then moved to Johns Hopkins in 1970, where he remained for the rest of his career. For twelve years, he was the editor in chief of the American Journal of Philology. He retired in 1990.

== Selected publications ==
- Der Akademiker Antiochos (Haupt, 1953). This monograph, Luck's Ph.D. thesis, collects the fragments of text attributed by name to Antiochus of Ascalon, and discusses other texts that are likely to have been influenced by Antiochus.
- The Latin love elegy (Methuen, 1959). A discussion and translation of the elegies of the Latin poets Catullus, Tibullus, Propertius, and Ovid. A fifth poet of this style, Cornelius Gallus, is comparatively neglected, little of his poetry having survived.
- Arcana mundi : magic and the occult in the Greek and Roman worlds : a collection of ancient texts (Johns Hopkins University Press, 1985). Luck collects examples of magical thought in the ancient world, from Homer to the fall of Rome, and ranging in content from poetry and papyri to philosophy. This work includes major sections on magic, miracles, demonology, divination, alchemy, and astrology. Originally written in English, it has also been translated into German, Italian, and Spanish.
- Albi Tibulli Aliorumque Carmina (Teubner, 1988). A collection of the works of Tibullus, and a survey of the manuscripts from which these works were collected.
- Die Weisheit der Hunde. Texte der antiken Kyniker in deutscher Übersetzung mit Erläuterungen (Alfred Kröner, 1997). The history of the Cynics, from the collected ancient texts concerning them, which Luck has translated into German.
- Ancient pathways and hidden pursuits : religion, morals, and magic in the ancient world (University of Michigan Press, 1999). A collection of 22 of Luck's essays, on diverse topics, written over a 50-year time span.
