= Naigamesha =

Hindu and Jain childhood god

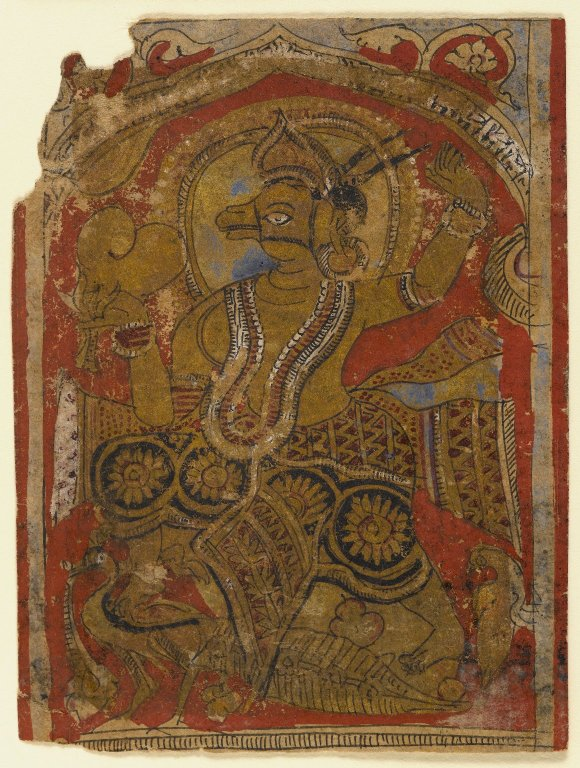
Harinegameshi carrying the embryo, fragment of a leaf from a dispersed Kalpasutra, Brooklyn Museum

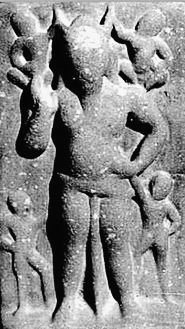
Naigamesha, Mathura Museum, Kushan Empire, 1st-3rd century CE.

Naigamesha (Sanskrit: नैगमेष, romanized: Naigameṣa), also known as Harinegameshi, is a goat-headed or deer-headed deity, associated with children. He also appears in Jain as well as Hindu traditions, associated with the war-god Kartikeya and childbirth.

== Associations ==
Naigamesha is known by a variety of names: Harinegameshin, Negamesha, Nemesha, Naigameshin, Negamesi, Harinegameshi. The last is translated as "Negamesi, the general of Hari (Indra)". Another interpretation says that it is derived from harina (deer) and mesha (ram).

Naigamesha is the benefactor and protector of children in Jainism. While the Greek satyr Pan is depicted with the lower body of a goat, Naigamesha has a goat head; in both cultures, the goat denotes fertility. He is worshipped to beget children.

== Literature ==
=== Jainism ===
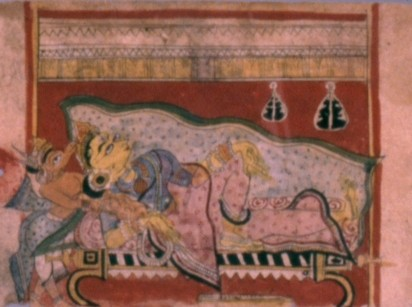
Naigamesha (left) looks over Mahavira's birth; the infant Mahavira is held in his mother's arms. Folio from the Kalpa Sutra (1450–1500).

According to the Kalpa Sutra, Naigamesha, on the orders of the king of the gods Indra, transferred the embryo of the Tirthankara Mahavira from the womb of the Brahmin (priest class) woman Devananda to the Kshatriya (ruling caste) Trishala, who finally delivers Mahavira. According to the Śvetāmbara text Neminanathacharita, which recalls the life of the Tirthankara Neminatha, Krishna – a cousin of Neminatha and generally venerated as Hindu deity – worships Naigamesha to beget a son from his second wife Satyabhama; a son who equals his first-born Pradyumna, from his first wife Rukmini. Other texts portray Satyabhama praying to the deity.

=== Hinduism ===
In Hinduism, Naigamesha is associated with Kartikeya, the god of war and is frequently mentioned as Naigameya. Naigamesha is an epithet and a form of Kartikeya, where he is generally depicted goat-headed. In other instances, Naigamesha is described as the son or brother of the war god. Hindu texts like the Brahmanas, the Grihya sutras and medicinal texts mention a similar deity with a ram's head. As a fearsome follower of Kartikeya, Naigamesha was feared and worshipped to ward off evil. Later, he evolved into the patron of childbirth.

== Iconography ==
Depictions of Naigamesha are rare and are generally confined to North India and the pre-third century era. They are many depictions of the deity found in the region around Mathura, dating from the 1st–3rd century. Terracotta figurines of Naigamesha from 2nd century BCE to 4th century CE are also been discovered.

In a 1st–3rd century depiction from Kankali Tila near Mathura (currently in Mathura Museum), Naigamesha is depicted with a goat's head and short, backward turning horns, a long beard (goatee) and "drooping" ears. Another sculpture from the 10th–13th century depicts him in the company of Hindu deities. The group of seven Hindu mother-goddesses, the Saptamatrika – who are associated with children – are surrounded by their usual companions Shiva and Ganesha as well as Naigamesha. The goat-features mirror the earlier depiction. In addition, Naigamesha is depicted with three children; one held in his left arm, another seated near his left foot and a third standing near the right leg, which conveys his association with children.

Besides his goat-head, Naigamesha may also be shown having a deer head and may be depicted transferring the embryo of Mahavira in narrative panels. He is also depicted as seated on a throne, flanked by children on his lap or shoulders. Female attendants or a goat-headed woman sometimes accompany the god.
