= Witchcraft Research Association =

British organisation

- Formation: 1964; 62 years ago
- Founder: Gerard Noel
- Dissolved: 1966; 60 years ago

The Witchcraft Research Association was a British organisation formed in 1964 in an attempt to unite and study the various claims that had emerged of surviving remnants of the so-called Witch-Cult, such as those of Gerald Gardner, Robert Cochrane, Sybil Leek, Charles Cardell, and Raymond Howard.

It had been set up by Gerard Noel, with the help of several other interested witches. Presidency was first held by Sybil Leek, but after she was forced to emigrate to the United States after suffering persecution and being evicted from her home, it was taken over by Doreen Valiente, who had herself already been involved in several strands of neopagan witchcraft, including Gardnerian Wicca, Cochrane's Craft and the Coven of Atho.

The WRA published the Pentagram newsletter beginning August 1964.

== Formation ==
In February 1964 Sybil Leek announced the formation of the Witchcraft Research Association, with herself as its first president. The historian Ronald Hutton suggested that its creation had been influenced by two recent events: the death of prominent Wiccan Gerald Gardner and a lecture tour by the historian Russell Hope Robbins in which Robbins had publicly criticised the Witch-cult hypothesis promoted by Margaret Murray. Leek's reputation was however damaged by press hostility and a strained relationship with other Wiccans, resulting in her resignation as President of the WRA in July and her emigration to the United States. The Presidency was taken up by Doreen Valiente.

On 3 October 1964, the WRA held a dinner in which fifty Witches were present. At the dinner, Valiente gave an address in which she called for the reunification of what she believed where the many scattered remains of the Murrayite witch-cult across Britain. According to Hutton, "it was probably the first and last gathering in modern Pagan history where most of the men wore black ties and dinner jackets". Cochrane attended the event, as did the sympathetic journalist Justine Glass, who went on to write Witchcraft, the Sixth Sense – and Us, published by Spearman in 1965.

== Pentagram newsletter ==
The WRA newsletter Pentagram was edited by a friend of Robert Cochrane named Gerard Noel. In the first issue, Valiente included an article in which she expressed the hope that the WRA would become a "United Nations of the Craft", bringing together different Wiccan traditions in the spirit of unity. According to Hutton, "the Association fell at this initial hurdle." In the next issue of Pentagram, an article was contributed by Cochrane, in which he echoed Valiente's call for a full study of the differing forms of the witch-cult, which in his view would reveal an ancient mystery religion which lay behind them. He extolled his own mystical interpretation of the religion as the most true, deeming it superior to others. However, one of Cochrane's friends, "Taliesin", also produced an article for the newsletter in which he claimed to be a member of a Goddess-focused hereditary tradition based in the West Country. In several articles published between May and December he extolled his own tradition and scornfully criticised others. In one of these articles he criticised Valiente's speech at the WRA dinner as exemplifying "the Gardnerian atmosphere of sweetness and light coupled with good clean fun under the auspices of a Universal Auntie". Hutton believed that this was probably the first appearance in print of the term "Gardnerian" to describe the followers of Gardner's Wiccan tradition.

Two Gardnerians, Arnold Crowther and "Monsieur", responded to Taliesin's criticisms, to which he then retaliated with what Hutton called "an even nastier reply". Cochrane had encouraged "Taliesin" in his messages, which damaged the relationship between Cochrane and Valiente. She had little respect for "Taliesin"; conducting research into him, she found that he had no apparent connection to a West Country tradition, that he instead lived near to Cochrane in the Thames Valley, and that he had for a time been a member of Gardner's Bricket Wood coven.

The Pagan studies scholar Ethan Doyle White noted that a column on Halloween that was contained in the fifth issue of Pentagram featured the second oldest printed use of the term "Wicca" in reference to Pagan Witchcraft that he was aware of. Although the name of the column's author was not included, Doyle White speculated that it might have been Noel or Valiente.

An advert for Pentagram was placed in the U.S. magazine Fate. The scholar of modern Paganism Chas S. Clifton suggested that Noel had chosen to advertise in Fate because it was the only magazine devoted to paranormal phenomena which was distributed nationally across the U.S. This advert introduced the American Witch Joseph Wilson to Pentagram, and on the basis of it he decided to establish his own American publication, The Waxing Moon: A Witchcraft Newsletter. Wilson began corresponding with Noel, who agreed to place an advert for The Waxing Moon in the final issue of Pentagram. This resulted in Cochrane opening a correspondence with Wilson. In his first letter, written on 20 December 1965, Cochrane asked Wilson if there were a system of ley lines in North America and claiming that the star on the Flag of Texas constituted proof that many of the British settlers who arrived in the Americas were witches. Their correspondence continued for another half year, being ended by Cochrane's suicide in the summer of 1966.

The rancour between competing Wiccan factions severely damaged Pentagram, which folded in 1966, when the WRA also came to an end. Following the culmination of Pentagram, a group of British Gardnerians under the editorship of Dorset-based John Score replaced it with a newsletter titled The Wiccan, first issued in July 1968. In Clifton's view, The Wiccan represented a "successor" to Pentagram. "Taliesin" meanwhile was not publicly heard from again.

== See also ==
- Neopagan witchcraft
- Wiccan organisation
