= Etymology of Wicca =

Origin of the word "Wicca"

In Modern English, the term Wicca (/ˈwɪkə/) refers to Wicca, the religion of contemporary Pagan witchcraft. (Note: Here, the Pagan Witchcraft religion refers to those traditions which share similar theological beliefs, commemorate seasonal Sabbats and practice magical rituals; this definition was utilised by Pagan Studies scholar Ethan Doyle White.) It is used within the Pagan community under competing definitions. One refers to the entirety of the Pagan Witchcraft movement, while the other refers explicitly to traditions included in what is now called British Traditional Wicca.

Although pronounced differently, the term Wicca is a modern derivation of the Old English word ƿiċċa, pronounced [ˈwittʃɑ], which referred to sorcerers in Anglo-Saxon England and has yielded the modern English word witch. In the early 1950s, English Wiccan Gerald Gardner, founder of the Gardnerian tradition, referred to the Pagan Witchcraft community as the Wica. He claimed to have learned the term during his initiation into the New Forest coven in 1939. By the late 1950s, Gardner's rival Charles Cardell, founder of his own tradition, had begun referring to the religion's followers as Wiccens, and possibly used Wicca in reference to the religion itself.

The inclusive use of the term Wicca—referring to the entirety of Pagan Witchcraft religion—has been traced to Britain in the early 1960s, when it was used by various groups and publicised through use in adverts, magazines, and other literary sources. It was later adopted by figures like Alex Sanders and Gavin and Yvonne Frost, who took it to the United States. There, practitioners of British Traditional Wicca adopted it exclusively for themselves as a means to differentiate their practices from those of other Pagan Witches. This exclusive meaning was countered by its popularisation as a generic term by prolific authors such as Raymond Buckland, Scott Cunningham and Silver RavenWolf. As it entered popular culture, it gained an increasingly eclectic character in its usage. During the 1990s, some attempted to distance themselves from it by utilising the term traditional witchcraft.

== Definitions ==
There are two separate definitions of the term Wicca that have been used in Paganism and Pagan studies since circa 1980. The first developed in England during the 1960s. Broad and inclusive, it covers most, if not all, forms of modern Pagan Witchcraft, especially if they share sufficient theological beliefs and ritual practices to be considered denominations within a common religious movement. In contrast, the second developed in the United States during the late 1970s. It refers specifically to the Gardnerian tradition of Witchcraft and those descended from it with little variation, namely Alexandrian and Algard Witchcraft, which are together known as British Traditional Wicca.

=== Usage within Pagan studies ===
The development and use of the term Wicca within contemporary Paganism has been a recurring topic of discussion in the field of Pagan studies. The majority of academics and independent scholars use the first, more inclusive definition. Given its historical status and prevalent usage within Paganism, Pagan studies scholar Ethan Doyle White thought it the logical and easier choice for academia, although there is still some disagreement and confusion among researchers as to what defines Wicca. Among those who have used the former definition are American sociologist Margot Adler, literary scholar Chas S. Clifton, and religious studies scholar Aidan A. Kelly, while others such as the Britons Graham Harvey and Ronald Hutton failed to make their usage clear. To deal with this problem in future, Doyle White urged scholars to specify which definition they used in their work.

== Origins ==
=== Old English ƿiċċa and ƿiċċe ===
In the Early Medieval language of Old English, the term ƿiċċa (pronounced [ˈwittʃɑ]) was a masculine noun for sorcerer; ƿiċċe was its feminine counterpart. They are ancestral to Modern English witch. The Modern English term Wicca took the Old English wicca as its basis, although the two are fundamentally two distinct words with differing meanings, pronunciation, and grammatical usage, with nearly a millennium between their respective floruits.

In 1932 Lewis Spence writes in The Weekly Scotsman, in response to the popularisation of Margaret Murray's witch-cult hypothesis in Scotland, that "the Saxon word 'wicca', a witch" was "of immemorial usage" in the Scottish Lowlands.

Doyle White suggests that the early Wiccans adopted the term wicca as the basis for the name of their burgeoning faith because theirs was a new religious movement that took "iconography and inspiration" from the polytheistic cults of pre-Christian Britain.

=== Gerald Gardner's Wica: 1939–1966 ===
Contrary to a claim that is often used in the Pagan and occult communities today, Gerald Gardner, the founder of Gardnerian Witchcraft and the public face of the movement during the late 1950s and early 1960s, did not refer to his tradition of the Craft as "Wicca", and there is in fact no recorded instance of him ever using the word. Instead, he referred to his faith as "the Craft of the Wise", "witchcraft", and "the witch cult", the latter of which was likely taken from the title of Egyptologist Margaret Murray's seminal proto-Wiccan text The Witch-Cult in Western Europe (1921).

— Ethan Doyle White, 2010

Gerald Gardner (1884–1964), the man largely responsible for propagating the Wiccan religion in Britain during the 1950s and 1960s and the founder of the Gardnerian tradition, never used the term Wicca in either sense that it is used today. He referred to the religion as the "cult of witchcraft" or "the witch-cult", the latter likely being a term borrowed from Margaret Murray, who wrote a book entitled The Witch-Cult in Western Europe (1921). Gardner did use the term Wica, which he always spelled with only one c in his writings, but this did not refer to the religion itself, instead referring to the religion's practitioners in a plural sense.

What are [the witches] then? They are the people who call themselves the Wica, the "wise people", who practise the age‑old rites and who have, along with much superstition and herbal knowledge, preserved an occult teaching and working processes which they themselves think to be magic or witchcraft.

— Gerald Gardner, Witchcraft Today (1954)

In contrast with this plural use of the word, in a 1954 article written by Arnold Field, a reporter for the Daily Dispatch, Gardner had apparently explained to him that "there are man and woman witches. Each is called a wica." This quote offers the only piece of evidence that Gardner also referred to Pagan Witches individually as a wica. It is possible that Field misunderstood what Gardner was saying by not capitalising Wica, and that therefore Gardner might have never used Wica in a singular sense.

In his book The Meaning of Witchcraft (1959) Gardner states that he first heard the term Wica while being initiated into the New Forest coven in September 1939, stating that "I realised I had stumbled on something interesting; but I was half-initiated before the word Wica which they used hit me like a thunderbolt, and I knew where I was, and that the Old Religion still existed." This account was repeated in his biography, Gerald Gardner: Witch (1960), written by Idries Shah but attributed to Jack L. Bracelin, in which he is quoted as saying that "it was halfway through when the word Wica was first mentioned; and I knew that that which I had thought burnt out hundreds of years ago still survived." If Gardner's account was accurate and the New Forest coven had really existed, (Note: Gardner claimed that he had been initiated into the New Forest coven in September 1939, and that it was they who taught him the practice of Pagan Witchcraft. No proof of their existence has ever been brought forth, and while Gardner's biographer Philip Heselton and independent researcher Steve Wilson have defended his account, other Pagan Studies scholars like Aidan A. Kelly and Chas S. Clifton have argued that it was a fabrication of Gardner's to cover up the fact that he founded Pagan Witchcraft circa 1950.) then the fact that Gardner spelled the word as Wica would not necessarily indicate that the coven members had spelled it the same way. As Shah relates, from Gardner's account, "it seems that he had heard rather than read the word in the midst of his initiatory rite" and that, "suffering from a poor grasp of spelling, punctuation, and grammar, something caused by the fact that he was self-educated and possibly also influenced by dyslexia", he would have therefore spelled the word phonetically as Wica.

It is evident that Gardner used the term "Wica" with a very specific spelling to refer to the members of the Pagan Witchcraft religion (and not just his own tradition) as a group, and perhaps also individually, and believed that the word had been used by the faith's members since the Early Mediaeval period.

— Ethan Doyle White, 2010

In The Meaning of Witchcraft, Gardner also notes the term Wica's resemblance to the Old English word wicca, stating that "It is a curious fact that when the witches became English-speaking they adopted their Saxon name 'Wica'." In his published writings, Gardner propounds the idea that his Pagan Witchcraft religion dated back at least to the Anglo-Saxon period, when Old English was the dominant language.

Wica soon became an accepted term among the early Gardnerians, as Gardner's followers and initiates became known. Patricia and Arnold Crowther, a Gardnerian High Priestess and High Priest who operated a coven in Sheffield, use the term in their book The Witches Speak (1959), writing that "[T]he Red Queen told Alice that she made words mean what [she] wanted them to mean. She might very well have been talking about witchcraft, for today it is used to describe anything that one wishes to use it for. From the simple meaning 'the craft of the Wica', it is used in connection with Black Magic, Satanism, Black Masses ..."

=== Charles Cardell's Wiccen: 1958–1960 ===
Charles Cardell (1892–1977) was the founder of a Pagan Witchcraft tradition that rivalled that of Gerald Gardner's in southern England during the 1950s. A psychologist and stage conjurer, Cardell ran a company named Dumblecott Magick Productions from his home in Charlwood, Surrey, from where he also controlled a local coven that was spied on by the press, leading to a well-publicised court case. Having been involved with Spiritualism as well as Pagan Witchcraft, Cardell initially befriended Gardner, but in 1958 they had an argument, and in 1964 Cardell tried to discredit him by publishing much of the then-secret Gardnerian Book of Shadows.

We feel it is tragick
That those who lack Magick.
Should start a vendetta
With those who know betta
We who practice the Art
Have no wish to take part
Seems a pity the "Wicca"
Do not realise this Quicca.

— Margaret Bruce, 1960

Cardell used the term Wiccen to refer not just to members of his own tradition, but to all followers of the Pagan Witchcraft religion, placing an advert in Light magazine, the journal of the College of Psychic Science, entitled "The Craft of the Wiccens" in 1958. The advert asked fellow Wiccens to get in contact with him. This advert shows that Cardell was responsible for the propagation and possibly invention of the term Wiccen.

It is possible Cardell had also used the term Wicca, evidenced by the fact that Margaret Bruce, the owner of a mail-order business selling occult titles, wrote a letter to her friend Gerald Gardner on 23 February 1960, in which she consoled him on the attacks made against him by Cardell and included a poem in which she referred to "the 'Wicca'". In Melissa Seims' opinion, this use of Wicca was explicitly in reference to the Cardellian Craft, and therefore meant "that this spelling, along with 'Wiccan', was used by Cardell." However, it is also possible that Bruce was referring to "the Wicca" as "a community of Pagan Witches", in which case it would be a misspelling of Gardner's "the Wica".

=== The emergence of Wicca: 1962–1970 ===
The term Wicca appears to have developed within the Pagan Witchcraft community during the early 1960s, as increasing numbers of Pagan Witches learned of the Old English term wicca, the etymological origin of the Modern term witch. This etymological fact had been referred to five times in Gerald Gardner's book The Meaning of Witchcraft (1959), as well as in other early texts propagating Pagan Witchcraft, such as Doreen Valiente's Where Witchcraft Lives (1962) and Justine Glass' Witchcraft, The Sixth Sense – and Us (1965). None of these specifically referred to the Pagan Witchcraft religion as Wicca.

The earliest known published reference for the word Wicca is within an advertisement published in a 1962 issue of Fate magazine; in this, a Cardiff-based group of Pagan Witches advertised a tradition as "Wicca–Dianic and Aradian". The advert may have been linked to Charles and Mary Cardell because Mary was allegedly born in Wales and Cardellian Witchcraft had apparently venerated a goddess under the name of Diana. However, many Pagan Witchcraft groups would have adopted the deity name Diana and Aradia, these being the goddesses featured in the American folklorist Charles Leland's supposed account of a Tuscan witch tradition, Aradia, or the Gospel of the Witches (1899). Another early use could be found from December 1965, in the penultimate issue of Pentagram, the newsletter of the Witchcraft Research Association. Here, a small column on Halloween made reference to "the Craft of the Wiccan", apparently referring to the entire Pagan Witchcraft community. The author's name was not printed, although it had probably been produced by one of the figures involved in editing Pentagram, such as Gerard Noel or Doreen Valiente. In July 1968, a group of British Gardnerians began publishing a magazine titled The Wiccan, while Welshman Gavin Frost founded the Church of Wicca in the United States that same year.

In the 1960s, the Gardnerian initiate Alex Sanders founded his own tradition, which became known as Alexandrian Wicca; he used the terms Wicca and the Wicca in reference to the entire Pagan Witchcraft religion. One of Sanders' initiates, Stewart Farrar, describes Wicca as "the witches' name for their Craft" in his book What Witches Do (1971). The widespread adoption of Wicca in reference to Pagan Witchcraft would have brought benefits to its practitioners, who were widely maligned and faced persecution for their practice of witchcraft; an emotive term often associated with Satanism that had negative connotations in the Western imagination. Doyle White argued that the practitioners' presentation of themselves as Wiccans rather than witches removed some of the social stigma that they faced.

== Popularisation ==
=== Developments in North America: 1970–1990 ===
From 1970 onward, increasing numbers of books teaching readers how to become Pagan Witches were published; the earliest was Paul Huson's Mastering Witchcraft (1970), which made no reference to Wicca. This was followed by Raymond Buckland's The Tree: The Complete Book of Saxon Witchcraft, in which he propagated his newly developed tradition of Seax-Wica; utilising Wica as the name of the tradition, he also referenced the Wicca as the name of the religion as a whole. Contrastingly, during the 1970s the term Wicca was rejected by feminist Pagan Witchcraft groups in the United States, in particular the Dianic tradition; the term does not appear in the early works of Zsuzsanna Budapest and Starhawk, although the latter would adopt it by the 21st century.

This was part of a phenomenon that took place during the 1970s and 1980s, as the term Wicca became increasingly associated purely with Gardnerianism and Alexandrianism (together known as British Traditional Wicca in North America), rather than with other variants of Pagan Witchcraft. This was encouraged by elements within the Gardnerian and Alexandrian communities who wished to emphasise what they perceived as their special position within the Pagan community. The word Wicca first appeared in a book title in 1981 as Wicca: The Ancient Way; written by Janus-Mithras, Nuit-Hilaria and Mer-Amun and published in Canada. It discussed a Gardnerian-based tradition.

=== Increasing popularisation and reaction: 1990–2010 ===
In ensuing years, many other authors would publish books containing Wicca in their titles which advocated solitary practice of Pagan Witchcraft; best known were Scott Cunningham's Wicca: A Guide for the Solitary Practitioner (1988) and Silver RavenWolf's Teen Witch: Wicca for a New Generation (1998), but other examples included Gerina Dunwich's The Wicca Garden (1996), D. J. Conway's Wicca: The Complete Craft (2001), Raymond Buckland's Wicca for Life (2004) and Wicca for One (2004), Arin Murphy-Hiscock's Solitary Wicca for Life (2005) and Ann-Marie Gallagher's The Wicca Bible (2005). It was also adopted by American novelist Cate Tiernan as the title of her series of young adult novels.

The term Wicca was employed in an increasingly eclectic manner by authors like RavenWolf, who considered it to be a synonym for witchcraft. In turn it began to be adopted on a wider scale, being popularised in India by Ipsita Roy Chakraverti and being adopted by a French Luciferian group, Le Wicca Française. Becoming widely known in western popular culture, it was utilised by the script writers of two popular American television shows, Buffy the Vampire Slayer and Charmed; the first episode of the latter was titled "Something Wicca This Way Comes" while the tenth was titled "Wicca Envy".

Reacting against the increasingly inclusive use of the term were Pagan Witches who instead characterised their practices as forms of traditional witchcraft. Many Pagan Witches who considered themselves to be Traditional Witches exhibited an us-and-them mentality against Gardnerianism and allied traditions, for whom they reserved the term Wicca. Doyle White suggests that they had done so in order to distance themselves from the increasing influence of the New Age movement over the Wiccan mainstream with its "iconographical emphasis on white light", instead embracing the traditional European view that associated witchcraft with darkness. Historian Ronald Hutton states that he knew of three Wiccan covens founded in the 1980s who began to describe themselves as Traditional Witches in the 1990s.
