= Doreen Valiente =

English Wiccan writer (1922–1999)

- Valiente with ritual paraphernalia
- Born: Doreen Edith Dominy; 4 January 1922; Mitcham, Surrey, England
- Died: 1 September 1999 (aged 77); Brighton, England
- Occupations: Wiccan priestess; writer

Doreen Edith Dominy Valiente (4 January 1922 – 1 September 1999) was an English Wiccan who was responsible for writing much of the early religious liturgy within the tradition of Gardnerian Wicca. An author and poet, she also published five books dealing with Wicca and related esoteric subjects.

Born to a middle-class family in Surrey, Valiente began practising magic while a teenager. Working as a translator at Bletchley Park during the Second World War, she also married twice in this period. Developing her interest in occultism after the war, she began practising ceremonial magic with a friend while living in Bournemouth. Learning of Wicca, in 1953 she was initiated into the Gardnerian tradition by its founder, Gerald Gardner. Soon becoming the High Priestess of Gardner's Bricket Wood coven, she helped him to produce or adapt many important scriptural texts for Wicca, such as The Witches Rune and the Charge of the Goddess, which were incorporated into the early Gardnerian Book of Shadows. In 1957, a schism resulted in Valiente and her followers leaving Gardner in order to form their own short-lived coven. After investigating the Wiccan tradition of Charles Cardell, she was initiated into Raymond Howard's Coven of Atho in 1963. She went on the following year to work with Robert Cochrane in his coven, the Clan of Tubal Cain, although she later broke from this group.

Eager to promote and defend her religion, she played a leading role in both the Witchcraft Research Association and then the Pagan Front during the 1960s and 1970s. That latter decade also saw her briefly involve herself in far right politics as well as becoming a keen ley hunter and proponent of Earth mysteries. As well as regularly writing articles on esoteric topics for various magazines, from the 1960s onward she authored a number of books on the subject of Wicca, as well as contributing to the publication of works by Wiccan friends Stewart Farrar, Janet Farrar, and Evan John Jones. In these works also she became an early advocate of the idea that anyone could practice Wicca without requiring initiation by a pre-existing Wiccan, while also contributing to and encouraging research into the religion's early history. Living in Brighton during these years, she was a member of the Silver Malkin coven and worked with Ron Cook, who was both her partner and initiate. In her final years she served as patron of the Sussex-based Centre for Pagan Studies prior to her death from pancreatic cancer.

Valiente's magical artefacts and papers were bequeathed to her last High Priest, John Belham-Payne, who donated them to a charitable trust, the Doreen Valiente Foundation, in 2011. Having had a significant influence in the history of Wicca, she is widely revered in the Wiccan community as "the Mother of Modern Witchcraft", and has been the subject of two biographies.

== Biography ==
=== Early life: 1922–1952 ===
Valiente was born Doreen Edith Dominy on 4 January 1922 in the London outer suburb of Colliers Wood, Mitcham, Surrey. Her father, Harry Dominy, was a civil engineer, and he lived with her mother Edith in Colliers Wood. Harry came from a Methodist background and Edith from a Congregationalist one, however Doreen was never baptised, as was the custom of the time, due to an argument that Edith had had with the local vicar. Doreen later claimed that she had not had a close or affectionate relationship with her parents, whom she characterised as highly conventional and heavily focused on social climbing. During her childhood they moved to Horley in Surrey, and it was there, according to her later account, that she had an early spiritual experience while staring at the Moon. From there her family moved to the West Country and then to the New Forest. In either late 1934 or 1935, Doreen's mother left her father and took her to live with maternal relatives in Southampton. Valiente first began practising magic at age 13, performing a spell to prevent her mother being harassed by a co-worker; she came to believe that it had worked. Her early knowledge of magical practices may have derived from books that she found in the local library. Her parents were concerned by this behaviour and sent her to a convent school. She despised the school and left it at the age of 15, refusing to return. She had wanted to go to art school, but instead gained employment in a factory, before moving on to work as a clerk and typist at the Unemployment Assistance Board.

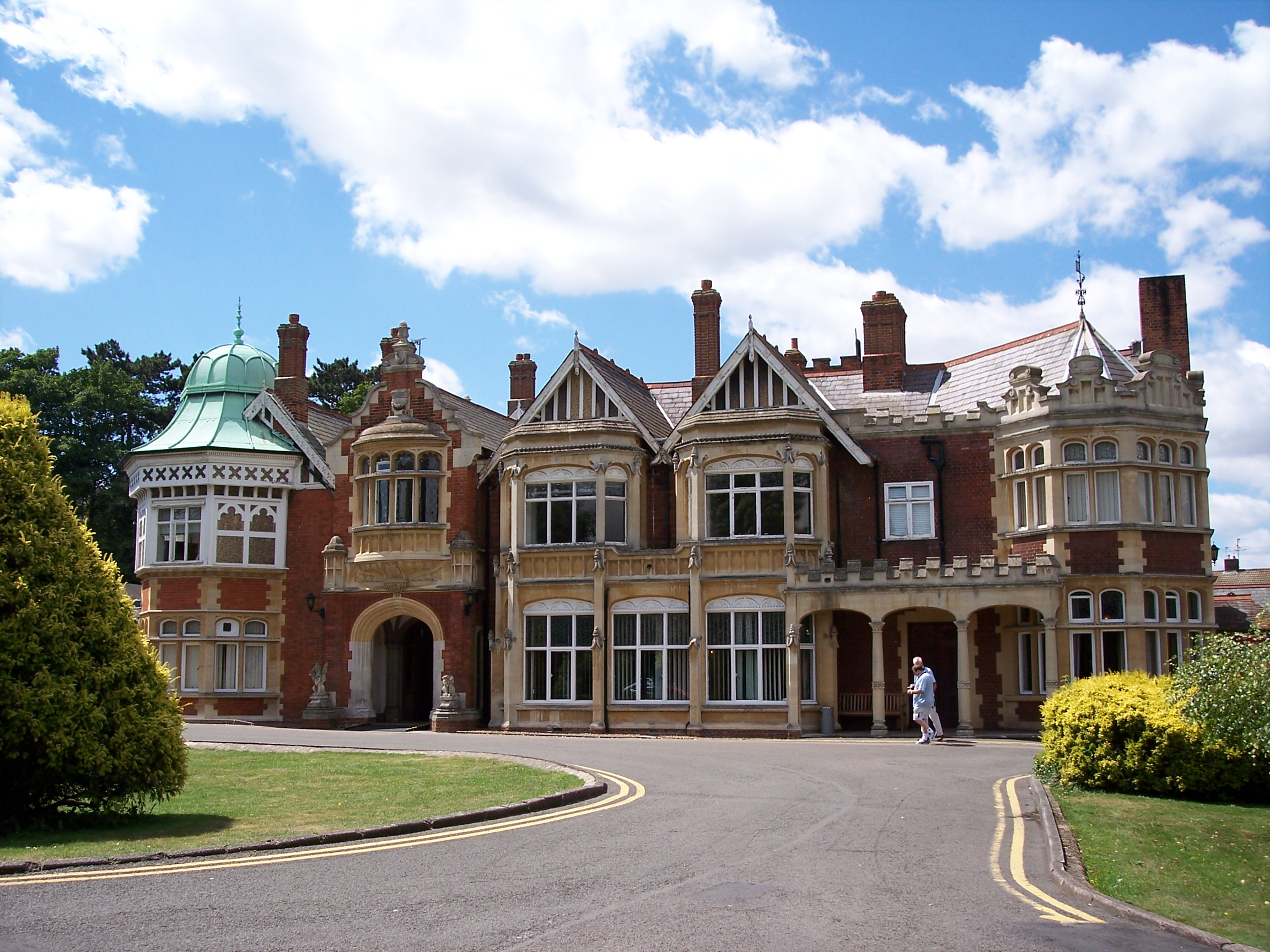
During the Second World War, Valiente worked at Bletchley Park

During the Second World War, she became a Foreign Office Civilian Temporary Senior Assistant Officer, in this capacity working as a translator at Bletchley Park. In relation to this work, she was also sent to South Wales, and it was there, in the town of Barry, that she met Joanis Vlachopolous, a Greek seaman in the Merchant Navy. Entering a relationship, they were married in East Glamorgan on 31 January 1941. However, in June 1941 he was serving aboard the Pandias when it was sunk by a U-boat off of the West African coast; he was declared missing in action and presumed deceased. Widowed, during 1942 and 1943 Valiente had a number of short-term jobs in Wales, which were possibly a cover for intelligence work.

After October 1943 she was transferred to the intelligence service's offices in Berkeley Street in the Mayfair area of London, where she was involved in message decryption. In London she met and entered into a relationship with Casimiro Valiente, a Spaniard who had fled from the Spanish Civil War, where he had fought on the side of the Spanish Republican Army before later joining the French Foreign Legion, where he was wounded at the Battle of Narvik and evacuated to England. They were married on 29 May 1944 at St Pancras Registry Office. The couple moved to Bournemouth – where Doreen's mother was then living – and here Casimiro worked as a chef. Valiente would later say that both she and her husband suffered racism after the war because of their foreign associations.

Developing an interest in occultism, she began practising ceremonial magic with a friend, "Zerki", at his flat. She had obtained the magical regalia and notebooks of a recently deceased doctor, who had been a member of the Alpha et Omega, a splinter group of the Hermetic Order of the Golden Dawn, and attempted to learn Hebrew, a language with uses in various forms of ceremonial magic. It was at this point that she selected "Ameth" as her magical name. She was particularly interested by John Symonds' book The Great Beast, which was a biography of the occultist Aleister Crowley, who had founded the religion of Thelema in 1904, and following this she avidly read a copy of Crowley's Magick in Theory and Practice which she found in a local library. Alongside these, she also had some practical experience with the esoteric religions of Spiritualism and Theosophy, having attended the services of a local Christian Spiritualist church in Charminster.

=== Gerald Gardner and the Bricket Wood Coven: 1952–1957 ===
"We seemed to take an immediate liking to each other. I realised that this man [Gardner] was no time-wasting pretender to occult knowledge. He was something different from the kind of people I had met in esoteric gatherings before. One felt that he had seen far horizons and encountered strange things; and yet there was a sense of humour about him and a youthfulness, in spite of his silver hair."

— Valiente on her first meeting with Gardner, 1989

She had also become familiar with the idea of a pre-Christian witch-cult surviving into the modern period through the works of Charles Godfrey Leland, Margaret Murray, and Robert Graves, although believed that the religion was extinct. It was in autumn 1952 that she read an article by the reporter Allen Andrews in Illustrated magazine titled "Witchcraft in Britain". Discussing the recent opening of the Folklore Centre of Superstition and Witchcraft in Castletown on the Isle of Man, it mentioned the museum's director, Cecil Williamson, and its "resident witch", Gerald Gardner.

Intrigued by the article, Valiente wrote a letter to Williamson in 1952, who in turn put her in contact with Gardner. Valiente and Gardner wrote several letters back-and-forth, with the latter eventually suggesting that she meet him at the home of his friend and fellow Wiccan Edith Woodford-Grimes ("Dafo"), who lived not far from Bournemouth, in the Christchurch area. Before she left the meeting, Gardner gave her a copy of his 1949 novel, High Magic's Aid, in which he describes a fictionalised account of Wiccan initiates in the Middle Ages; he allegedly did so in order to gauge her opinion on ritual nudity and scourging, both of which were present in his tradition of Gardnerian Wicca.

Gardner invited Valiente again to Woodford-Grimes's house on Midsummer 1953, and it was here that he initiated her into Wicca in a ritual during which they stood before an altar and he read from his Book of Shadows. The three of them then set off to the prehistoric monument of Stonehenge in Wiltshire, where they witnessed the Druids performing a ritual there. Gardner had lent a ritual sword which he owned to the Druids, who placed it within the monument's Heel Stone during their rite. Valiente told her husband and mother about the visit to Stonehenge, but not about her initiation, of which, she feared, they would not have approved.

Later in the year, Gardner invited Valiente to visit him at his flat in Shepherd's Bush, West London, and it was there that she met the eight to ten members of his Bricket Wood coven, which met near St. Albans, north of London. She soon rose to become the coven's High Priestess. The historian Ronald Hutton later commented that in doing so, she formed "the second great creative partnership of [Gardner's] life" after that with Woodford-Grimes. Valiente recognised how much of the material in Gardner's Book of Shadows was taken not from ancient sources as Gardner had initially claimed, but from the works of Crowley. She confronted Gardner with this; he claimed that the text he had received from the New Forest coven had been fragmentary, and he had had to fill much of it using various sources. She took the Book of Shadows, and with Gardner's permission, rewrote much of it, cutting out a lot of sections that had come from Crowley, fearing that his infamous reputation would sully Wicca. In 1953 she wrote "Queen of the Moon, Queen of the Stars", an invocation for use in a Yule ritual which was inspired by a Hebridean song found in the Carmina Gadelica. With Gardner she also wrote "The Witches Rune", a chant for use while dancing in a circle. She rewrote much of the Charge of the Goddess, with Hutton characterising this act as "her greatest single contribution to Wicca", for her version of the Charge became "the principle expression of Wiccan spirituality" in coming years.

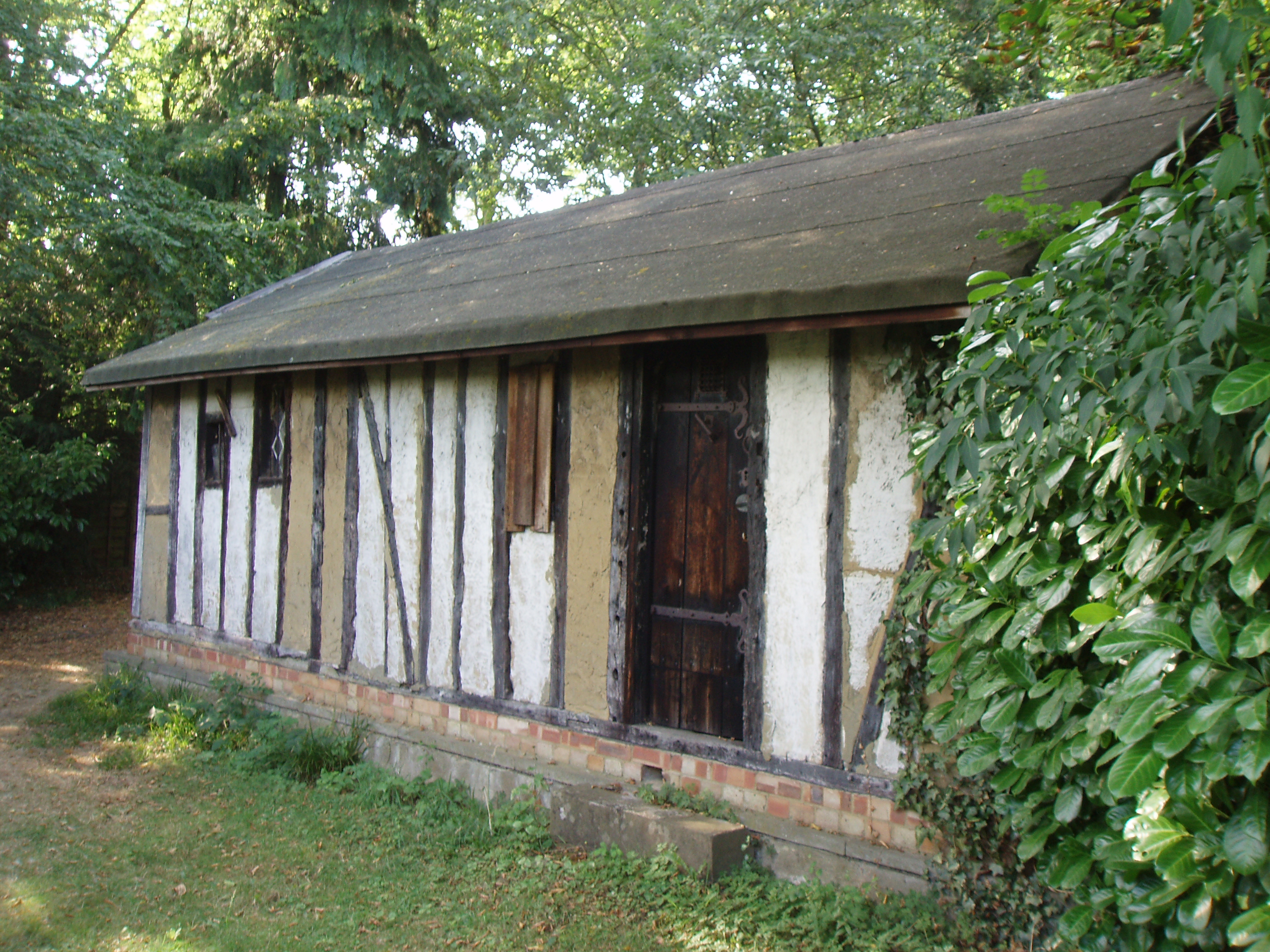
The Witches' Cottage, a ritual space used by Valiente's Bricket Wood coven, as it appeared in 2006.

Gardner spent his summers at the Museum of Magic and Witchcraft on the Isle of Man, and thus often relied on Valiente to deal with his affairs in Southern England. He sent her to meet the occult artist Austin Osman Spare when he wanted some talismans produced by the latter. Spare subsequently described Valiente as "a myopic stalky nymph... harmless and a little tiresome" in a letter that he wrote to Kenneth Grant. At Gardner's prompting, she also met with the occultist Gerald Yorke, who was interested in learning about Wicca; Gardner insisted that she lie to Yorke by informing him that she was from a longstanding family of hereditary Wiccan practitioners. She also aided him in preparing his second non-fiction book about Wicca, The Meaning of Witchcraft, focusing in particular on those sections refuting the sensationalist accusations of the tabloid press.

However Gardner's increasing desire for publicity, much of it ending up negative, caused conflict with Valiente and other members of his coven like Ned Grove and Derek Boothby. She felt that in repeatedly communicating with the press, he was compromising the coven's security. She was also not enthusiastic about two young people whom Gardner brought into the coven, Jack L. Bracelin and his girlfriend 'Dayonis', stating that "a more qualid pair of spivs it would be hard to find indeed". Two factions emerged within the coven; Valiente led a broadly anti-publicity group, while Gardner led a pro-publicity one. In 1957, Valiente and Grove drew up a list of "Proposed Rules of the Craft" which were partly designed to curtail Gardner's publicity-seeking. From his home in the Isle of Man, he responded that this was not necessary for a series of rules already existed—at which point he produced the Wiccan Laws. These laws limited the control of the High Priestess, which angered Valiente, who later realised that Gardner had simply made them up in response to her own Proposed Laws. In summer 1957, the coven split. According to Valiente, she and her followers "had had enough of the Gospel according to St. Gerald; but we still believed that the real traditional witchcraft lived". According to Pagan studies scholar Ethan Doyle White, "Wicca had experienced its first great schism".

=== Robert Cochrane and Where Witchcraft Lives: 1957–1969 ===
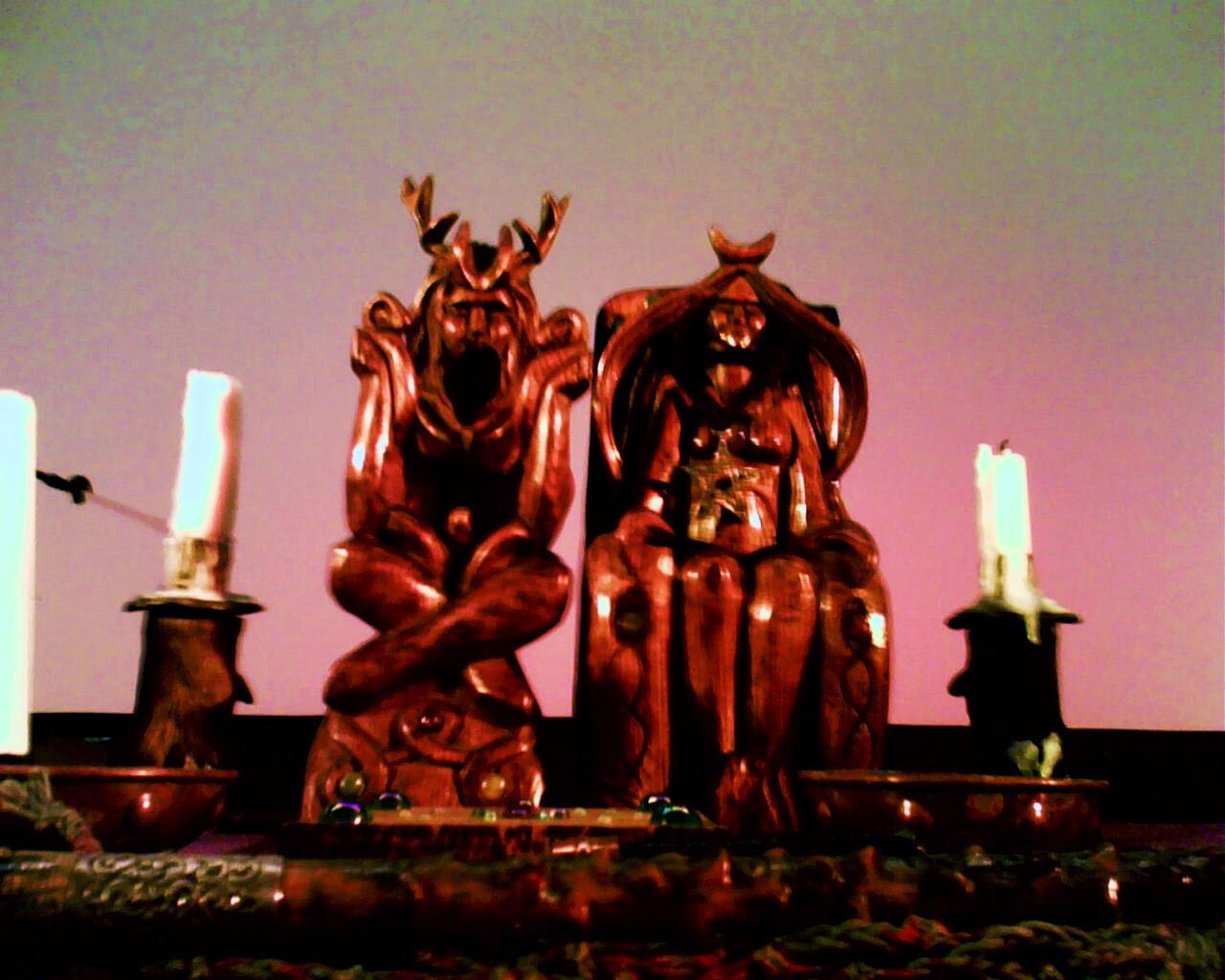
Altar statues of the Horned God and Mother Goddess crafted by Bel Bucca and owned by Valiente

After breaking from Gardner's Bricket Wood coven, Valiente formed her own coven with Grove as High Priest, still following the tradition of Gardnerian Wicca, albeit without the Wiccan laws, which she believed to be entirely an invention of Gardner's. However, this coven failed to last, breaking up amid arguments between its founders. In 1956, Valiente, along with her husband and her mother, moved into a basement flat in Lewes Crescent, Kemptown, in the southern coastal town of Brighton, although in 1968 they moved into a flat nearer to the town centre. She befriended another Kemptown resident, the journalist Leslie Roberts, who shared her interest in the supernatural. He attracted much attention to himself in the local press through his claims that practitioners of black magic were also operating in the area. Valiente remained a good friend to Roberts until his death from heart disease in 1966. She also got back in touch with Gardner, and mended their friendship, remaining on good terms until his death in 1964, when he left her £200 in his will. During the early 1960s she also developed a correspondence with two Gardnerian initiates in Sheffield, Patricia Crowther and her husband Arnold Crowther, finally meeting them when the latter couple visited Brighton in 1965.

After her mother's death in August 1962, Valiente felt that she could be more open about being a Wiccan herself. Eager to spread information about Wicca throughout Britain, she also began to interact with press, sending a 1962 letter to the Spiritualist newspaper Psychic News, and in 1964 being interviewed for her involvement with Wicca by Brighton's Evening Argus. During the 1960s, she began producing articles about Wicca and other esoteric subjects on a regular basis, for such esoteric magazines as Light, Fate, and Prediction. In this capacity, she also began to make appearances on television and radio. She also involved herself in the newly formed Witchcraft Research Association (WRA), becoming its second President after the resignation of Sybil Leek. Valiente's letter of welcome was included in the first issue of the WRA's newsletter, Pentagram, published in August 1964, while she also gave a speech at the WRA's Halloween dinner in October. It was at the speech that Valiente proclaimed the Wiccan Rede; this was its first public appearance in a recognisable form, with Doyle White arguing that it was Valiente herself who both created and named the Rede. It was through the WRA that Valiente came to communicate with the journalist Justine Glass, who was then conducting research for her book Witchcraft, the Sixth Sense, and Us.

Valiente's painting of the head of Atho, a form of the Horned God.

Valiente began visiting local libraries and archives in order to investigate the history of witchcraft in Sussex. On the basis of this research, the esoteric press Aquarian published her first book, Where Witchcraft Lives, in 1962. Just as Gardner had done in his book Witchcraft Today, here Valiente did not identify as a practising Wiccan, but as an interested scholar of witchcraft. It contained her own research into the history and folklore of witchcraft in her county of Sussex, which she had collected both from archival research and from the published work of the historian L'Estrange Ewen. It interpreted this evidence in light of the discredited theories of Margaret Murray, which claimed that a pre-Christian religious movement had survived to the present, when it had emerged as Wicca. Hutton later related that it was "one of the first three books to be published on the subject" of Wicca, and that the "remarkable feature of the book is that it remains, until this date [2010], the only one produced by a prominent modern witch that embodies actual original research into the records of the trials of people accused of the crime of witchcraft during the early modern period." In 1966, Valiente then produced a manuscript for a book titled I am a Witch!, a collection of poems with a biographical introduction; however, it was never published, publishers not believing that it would be commercially viable.

Valiente learned of the non-Gardnerian Wiccan Charles Cardell from a 1958 article, and subsequently struck up a correspondence with him. Cardell suggested that they pool their respective traditions together, but Valiente declined the offer, expressing some scepticism regarding Cardell's motives and conduct. In 1962, Valiente began a correspondence course run by Raymond Howard, a former associate of Cardell's; this course instructed her in a Wiccan tradition known as the Coven of Atho. At Halloween 1963 she was then initiated into the Coven of Atho in a ritual overseen by Howard, entering the lowest rank of the course, that of 'Sarsen', and beginning to copy the teachings that she received into notebooks, where she was able to identify many of the sources from which Howard had drawn upon in fashioning his tradition.

In 1964, Valiente was introduced to the Pagan witch Robert Cochrane by a mutual friend, the ceremonial magician William G. Gray, who had met him at a gathering at Glastonbury Tor held by the Brotherhood of the Essenes. Although sceptical of Cochrane's claims to have come from a hereditary family of witches, she was impressed by his charisma, his desire to avoid publicity, and his emphasis on working outdoors. Valiente was invited to join Cochrane's coven, the Clan of Tubal Cain, becoming its sixth member. However, she became dissatisfied with Cochrane, who was openly committing adultery and constantly insulting Gardnerians, even at one point calling for "a Night of the Long Knives of the Gardnerians", at which point Valiente openly criticised him and then left his Clan. In her own words, she "rose up and challenged him in the presence of the rest of the coven. I told him that I was fed up with listening to all this senseless malice, and that, if a 'Night of the Long Knives' was what his sick little soul craved, he could get on with it, but he could get on with it alone, because I had better things to do". Shortly after, Cochrane committed ritual suicide on Midsummer 1966; she authored the poem "Elegy for a Dead Witch" in his memory. She remained in contact with his widow and other members of the Clan, as well as with Gray, and proceeded to work on occasion with The Regency, a group founded by former members of the Clan.

=== The Pagan Front, National Front, and further publications: 1970–1984 ===
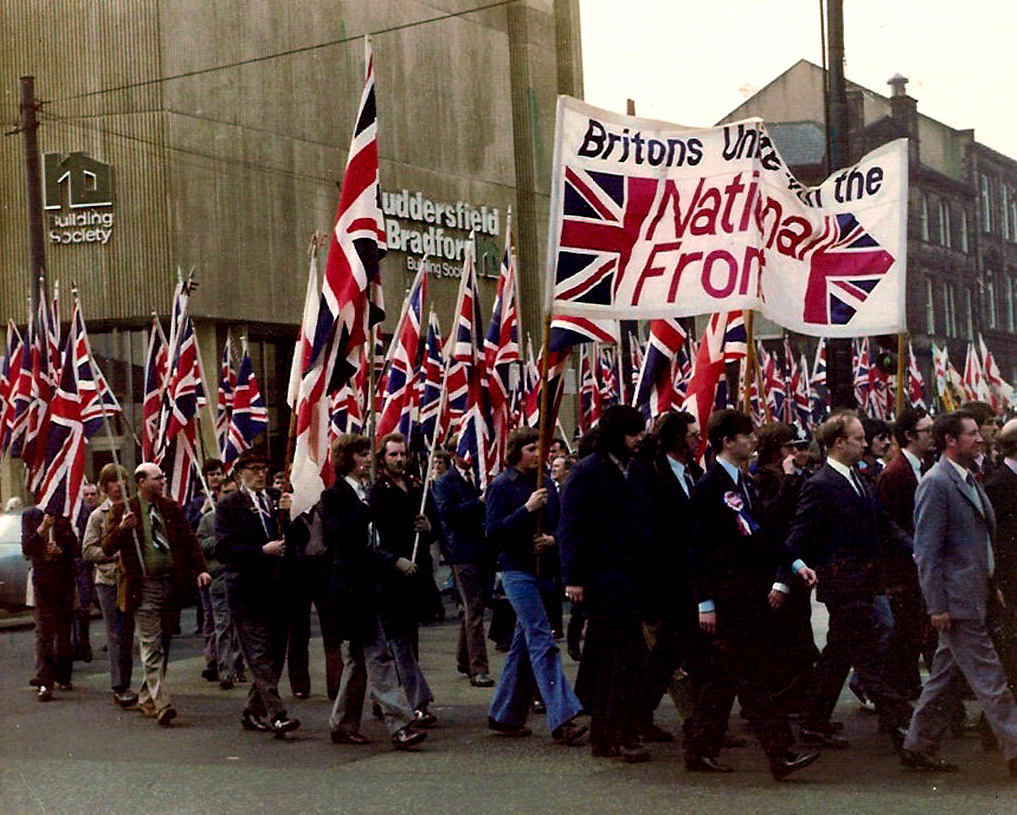
Valiente involved herself in a regional branch of the National Front (National Front demonstration pictured)

Living in Brighton, Valiente took up employment in a branch of the Boots pharmacist. In 1971 she appeared on the BBC documentary, Power of the Witch, which was devoted to Wicca and also featured the prominent Wiccan Alex Sanders. That same year, she was involved in the founding of the Pagan Front, a British pressure group that campaigned for the religious rights of Wiccans and other Pagans. In November 1970 she developed a full moon inauguration ritual for local branches of the Front to use and on May Day 1971 she chaired its first national meeting, held at Chiswick, West London. It was she who developed the three principles that came to be central to the Pagan Front's interpretation of their religion: adherence to the Wiccan Rede, a belief in reincarnation, and a sense of kinship with nature.

In April 1972 her husband Casimiro died; he had never taken an interest in Wicca or esotericism and Valiente later claimed that theirs had been an unhappy relationship. Newly widowed, she soon had to move as the local council decided that her home was unfit for human habitation; she was relocated into council accommodation in the mid-1960s tower block of Tyson Place in Grosvenor Square, Brighton. Her flat was described by visitors as cramped, being filled with thousands of books. It was there that she met Ronald Cooke, a member of the apartment block's residents' committee; they entered into a relationship and she initiated him into Wicca, where he became her working partner. Together they regularly explored the Sussex countryside, and went on several holidays to Glastonbury, further considering moving there. She also joined a coven that was operating in the local area, Silver Malkin, after it was established by the Wiccan High Priestess Sally Griffyn.

During the early 1970s, Valiente became a member of a far right white nationalist political party, the National Front, for about eighteen months, during which she designed a banner for her local branch. Valiente's biographer Philip Heselton suggested that the party's nationalistic outlook may have appealed to her strongly patriotic values and that she might have hoped that the Front would serve as a political equivalent to the Pagan movement. At the same time she also became a member of another, more extreme far right group, the Northern League. However, she allowed her membership of the National Front to lapse, sending a letter to her local branch stating that although she respected its leader John Tyndall and had made friends within the group, she was critical of the party's opposition to women's liberation, gay rights, and sex education, all of which she lauded as progressive causes. Heselton has also suggested that Valiente may have joined these groups in order to investigate them before reporting back to Britain's intelligence agencies.

It was also in the early 1970s that she read John Michell's The View Over Atlantis and was heavily influenced by it, embracing Michell's view that there were ley lines across the British landscape that channelled earth energies. Inspired, she began searching for ley lines in the area around Brighton. She also began subscribing to The Ley Hunter magazine, for which she authored several articles and book reviews. Valiente came to see the public emergence of Wicca as a sign of the Age of Aquarius, arguing that the religion should ally with the feminist and environmentalist movements in order to establish a better future for the planet.

In 1973, the publishing company Robert Hale brought out Valiente's second book, An ABC of Witchcraft, in which she provided an encyclopaedic overview of various topics related to Wicca and esotericism. In 1975, Hale published Valiente's Natural Magic, a discussion of what she believed to be the magical usages and associations of the weather, stones, plants, and other elements of the natural world. In 1978 Hale then published Witchcraft for Tomorrow, in which Valiente proclaimed her belief that Wicca was ideal for the dawning Age of Aquarius and espoused James Lovelock's Gaia hypothesis. It also explained to the reader how they could initiate themselves into Wicca and establish their own coven. In 1978 she offered a book of poetry to Hale, although they declined to publish it, believing that there would not be sufficient market for such a publication. In 1982 she then submitted a book of short stories, The Witch Ball, to Hale, but again they declined to publish it.

In 1978, Valiente struck up a friendship with the Alexandrian Wiccans Stewart Farrar and Janet Farrar, who were then living in Ireland. With the Farrars, she agreed to publish the original contents of the Gardnerian Book of Shadows, in order to combat the garbled variants that had been released by Cardell and Lady Sheba. The original Gardnerian material appeared in the Farrars' two books, Eight Sabbats for Witches and The Witches' Way (1984), both published with Hale at Valiente's recommendation. In these works, Valiente and the Farrars identified differences between early recensions of the Book and identified many of the older sources that it drew upon. Hutton believed that later scholars such as himself had to be "profoundly grateful" to the trio for undertaking this task, while Doyle White opined that these publications, alongside Witchcraft for Tomorrow, helped contribute to "the democratisation of Wicca" by enabling any reader to set themselves up as a Wiccan practitioner. As an appendix to The Witches' Way she also published the result of her investigations into "Old Dorothy", the woman whom Gardner had claimed had been involved with the New Forest coven. The academic historian Jeffrey Burton Russell had recently suggested that Gardner invented "Old Dorothy" as an attempt to hide the fact that he had invented Wicca himself. Valiente sought to disprove this, discovering that "Old Dorothy" was a real person: Dorothy Clutterbuck. Valiente biographer Jonathan Tapsell described it as "one of Doreen's greatest known moments".

=== Autobiography and final years: 1985–1999 ===
In the mid-1980s, Valiente began writing an autobiography in which she focused on her own place within Wiccan history. It would be published by Hale in 1989 as The Rebirth of Witchcraft. In this work she did not dismiss the Murrayite witch-cult theory, but she did undermine the belief that Wicca was the survival of it by highlighting the various false claims made by Gardner, Cochrane, and Sanders, instead emphasising what she perceived as the religion's value for the modern era. She also provided a foreword for Witchcraft: A Tradition Renewed, a book published in 1990 by Hale. It had been written by Evan John Jones, a former member of the Clan of Tubal Cain who also lived in Brighton. Heselton has expressed the view that Valiente likely did more than this, and that she wrote a number of the chapters herself. As Valiente became better known, she came to correspond with a wide range of people within the Pagan and esoteric communities. Through this, she met the American Wiccan Starhawk – whom she greatly admired – on one of the latter's visits to Britain. She also communicated with the American Wiccan and scholar of Pagan studies Aidan A. Kelly during his investigations into the early Gardnerian liturgies. She disagreed with Kelly that there had been no New Forest coven and that Gardner had therefore invented Wicca, instead insisting that Gardner had stumbled on a coven of the Murrayite witch-cult.

There was a young lady called Freeman
Who had an affair with a demon
She said that his cock
was as cold as a rock
Now, what in the Hell could it be, man?

— "An Unsolved Problem of Psychic Research", an example of Valiente's poetry.

In 1997 Valiente discovered the Centre for Pagan Studies (CFPS), a Pagan organisation based in the Sussex hamlet of Maresfield that had been established in 1995. Befriending its founders, John Belham-Payne and his wife Julie Belham-Payne, she became the centre's patron and gave several lectures for the group. In 1997 Cooke died, leaving Valiente grief-stricken. Her final public speech was at the Pagan Federation's annual conference, held at Croydon's Fairfield Halls in November 1997; here she praised the work of early twentieth-century occultist Dion Fortune and urged the Wiccan community to accept homosexuals. Valiente's health was deteriorating as she was diagnosed first with diabetes and then terminal pancreatic cancer; increasingly debilitated, John Belham-Payne and two of her friends became her primary carers. In her last few days she was moved to the Sackville Nursing Home, there requesting that Belham-Payne publish an anthology of her poems after her death. She died on 1 September 1999, with Belham-Payne at her side. CFPS' barn in Maresfield, where an all-night vigil was held; those invited included Ralph Harvey, and Ronald Hutton. After this Pagan rite was completed, her coffin was cremated at Brighton's Woodvale crematorium, in an intentionally low-key service with John Belham-Payne, Doreen's last High priest as celebrant for the funeral. As per her wishes, Valiente's ashes were scattered in Sussex woodland. Her magical artefacts and manuscripts, including her Book of Shadows, were bequeathed to John Belham-Payne. Her book of poems was published posthumously in 2000, followed by an enlarged second edition in 2014.

== Personality ==
Hutton characterised Valiente as "a handsome woman of striking, dark-haired, aquiline looks, possessed of a strong, enquiring, candid, and independent personality, and a gift for poetry and ritual". Belham-Payne noted that Valiente was "very tall, rather reserved and preferred to be in the background", while Doreen Valiente Foundation Trustee, Ashley Mortimer described her as "sensible, practical, decent, honest and, perhaps most importantly, pragmatic". The writer Leo Ruickbie described her as "a plain, owlishly bespectacled woman with a slight stoop and a friendly twinkle in her eye". Throughout her life, Valiente remained a believer in the Murrayite Witch-Cult theory despite its having been academically discredited by the 1970s.

Valiente had a strong dislike of unexpected visitors, and would often refuse to answer the door to those who knocked unannounced. She was an avid fan of football, and closely followed the World Cup, refusing to open the door to any visitors while she was watching the competition on television. She also enjoyed betting on horse races.

== Reception and legacy ==
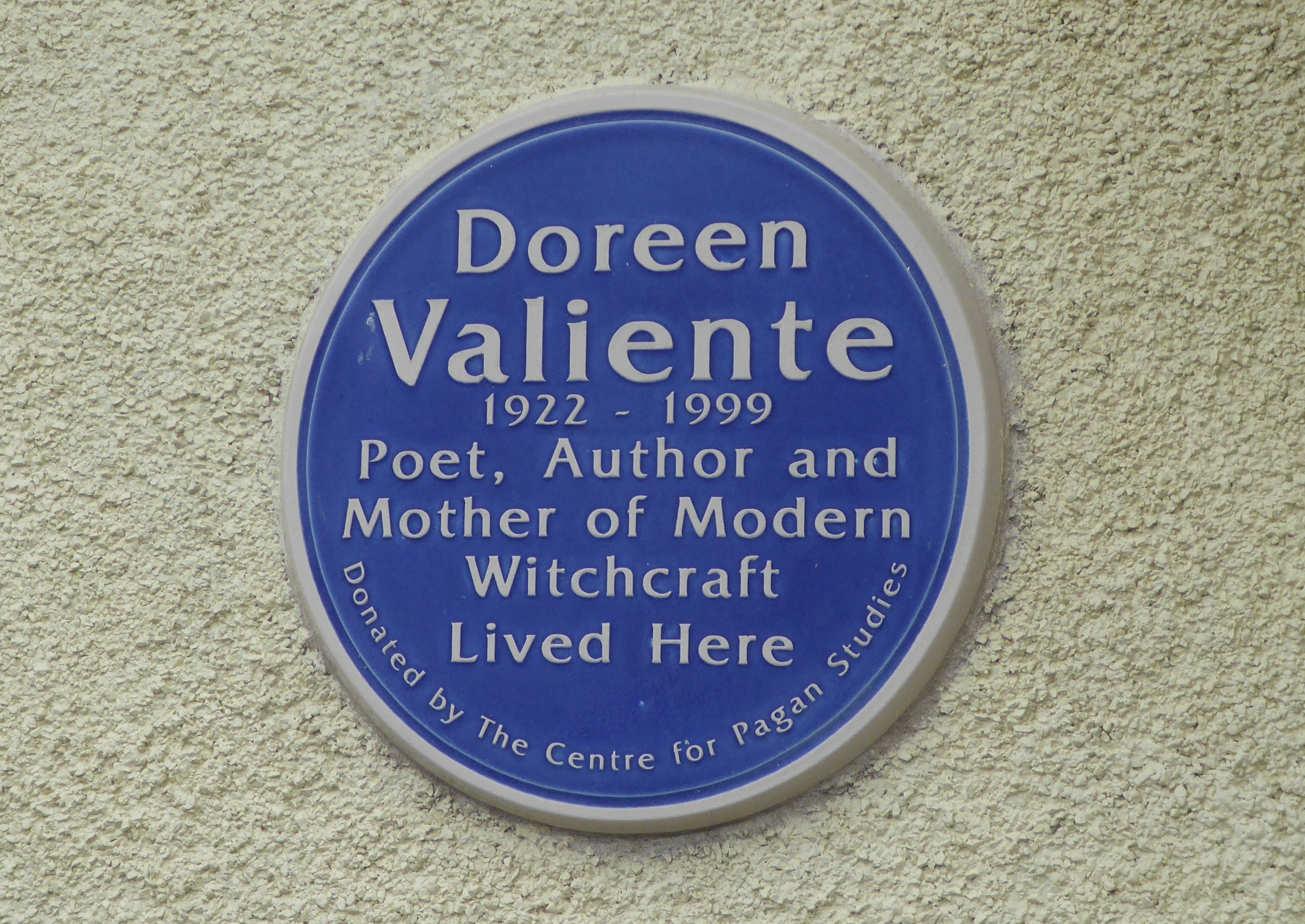
The blue plaque devoted to Doreen Valiente erected on her former home

Within the Wiccan community, Valiente has become internationally known as the "Mother of Modern Witchcraft" or "Mother of Wica", although she herself disliked this moniker. Heselton believed that Valiente's influence on Wicca was "profound and far-reaching", while Ruickbie characterised her as Gardner's "most gifted acolyte". Doyle White stated that an argument could be made that Gardner would "never have been anywhere near as successful" in promoting Wicca had he not had Valiente's help. In 2016, Heselton expressed the view that Valiente was best known for her books, which are "still some of the most readable on the subject" of Wicca, further highlighting that they often appeared on Wiccan reading lists. The ritual liturgies that Valiente composed also proved highly influential within the Wiccan religion and constitute a core element of her legacy.

Kelly asserted that Valiente "deserves credit for having helped transform the Craft from being the hobby of a handful of eccentric Brits into being an international religious movement". Describing her as "a major personality in the development" of Wicca, Hutton also expressed the view that "her enduring greatness lay in the very fact that she was so completely and strong-mindedly dedicated to finding and declaring her own truth, in a world in which the signposts to it were themselves in a state of almost complete confusion".

=== Events and organisations ===
In 2009, the CFPS organised "A Day for Doreen", an event in central London dedicated to Valiente. Sixteen speakers from within the Wiccan and Pagan community came to talk at the event, which was a sell-out. On 21 June 2013, the Centre For Pagan Studies unveiled a blue plaque at the Tyson Place tower block, Valiente's final home. Julie Belham-Payne performed the unveiling at the ceremony, and a speech was given by Denise Cobb, the Mayor of Brighton. It had been preceded by an open solstice ritual in Brighton's Steine Gardens, led by Ralph Harvey.

Following Valiente's death, John Belham-Payne received offers of substantial amounts of money from buyers seeking to purchase parts of her collection. In 2011 he entrusted the collection of artefacts that he had inherited from Valiente to the newly established the Doreen Valiente Foundation. A charitable trust, the Foundation was designed to prevent the collection being broken up and sold, moreover allowing for future Wiccans and researchers to start "delving into it, protecting it, making it accessible and available for people to research, learn from and enjoy." John Belham-Payne became the group's chairman, while Ashley Mortimer, Brian Botham, and Trish Botham were appointed as trustees.

Aside from Valiente's autobiography, The Rebirth of Witchcraft, the first published biography of Valiente was written by Jonathan Tapsell and published as Ameth: The Life and Times of Doreen Valiente by Avalonia Books in 2013. Doyle White characterised this volume as being "all-too-brief". Belham-Payne initially considered writing a biography of Valiente, but feeling that he was not academically qualified to do so, he commissioned Heselton – who had previously published several books on Gardner – to do so, publishing the result as Doreen Valiente: Witch through his Doreen Valiente Foundation in 2016. It held its launch party at the esoteric-themed bookstore, Treadwell's, in central London, in February 2016, shortly after Belham-Payne's death.

== Bibliography ==
Heselton's 2016 biography of Valiente includes a bibliography of her published work, as well as her contributions to other books.

Publication year	Title	Publisher
1962	Where Witchcraft Lives	Aquarian
1973	An ABC of Witchcraft	Robert Hale (London)
1975	Natural Magic	Robert Hale (London)
1978	Witchcraft for Tomorrow	Robert Hale (London)
1989	The Rebirth of Witchcraft	Robert Hale (London)
2000	Charge of the Goddess	Hexagon Hoopix
2011	Where Witchcraft Lives limited edition	Centre For Pagan Studies
2014	Charge of the Goddess expanded edition	Centre For Pagan Studies
