= Robert Cochrane (witch) =

English Wiccan (1931–1966)

- Born: Roy Bowers; 26 January 1931; London, England
- Died: 3 July 1966 (aged 35); Slough, Berkshire, England
- Occupation: Typographical draughtsman
- Spouse: Jane Bowers

Robert Cochrane (26 January 1931 – 3 July 1966), who was born as Roy Bowers, was an English occultist who founded the tradition of Witchcraft known as The Clan of Tubal Cain.

Born in a working-class family in West London, he became interested in occultism after attending a Society for Psychical Research lecture, taking a particular interest in witchcraft. He founded one coven, but it soon collapsed.

He began to claim to have been born to a hereditary family of witches whose practices stretched back to at least the 17th century; these statements have later been dismissed. He subsequently went on to found a tradition known as The Clan of Tubal Cain, through which he propagated his Craft. In 1966, he died by suicide.

Cochrane continues to be seen as a key inspirational figure in the traditional witchcraft movement. Ever since his death, a number of Neopagan and magical groups have continued to adhere to his teachings.

== Early life ==
As noted by Michael Howard, "factual details about Cochrane's early life are scant". He was born in an area between Hammersmith and Shepherd's Bush in West London into a family of eight children. He later described it as a "slum", though this has been refuted by family members, who considered it a "respectable working class area". There, he lived through the Blitz. Some of his family emigrated to Australia, while he went to art school, living a bohemian lifestyle. His aunt would later claim that he first took an interest in occultism after attending a talk of the Society for Psychical Research in Kensington.

"I come from the country of the oak, ash and thorn... I describe myself as a 'pellar'. The People are formed in clans or families and describe themselves by the local name of the Deity. I am a member of the People of Goda – the Clan of Tubal Cain. We were known locally as 'witches', 'the Good People', Green gowns (females only), 'Horsemen' and finally Wizards."

— Cochrane.

During the early 1950s, he joined the army as a part of his national service, but went absent without leave; as punishment, he was sentenced to 90 days imprisonment in a military prison in Colchester. He admitted to having a violent temper in his youth, but calmed after meeting Jane, whom he would later marry. For a time he worked for London Transport as a blacksmith in a foundry; one potential reason why he adopted the blacksmith Tubal Cain as a part of the mythos for his tradition. He and Jane later worked as bargees transporting coal around the English Midlands, taking an interest in the folklore of the Bargee community, later believing that it contained traces of the "Old Faith". By the start of the 1960s, he was living with Jane and their son on a London County Council-run council estate near to Slough, Berkshire; he did not like the neighbours, considering them "the biggest load of monkeys there have been trained since the Ark." He worked as a typographical draughtsman in an office, but disliked his job. He founded a witches' coven, but it soon broke up as one member died and he fell out with another.

Later, in the 1960s, he claimed that members of his family had been practitioners of an ancient pagan witch-cult since at least the 17th century, and that two of them had been executed for it. Claiming that his great-grandfather had been "the last Grand Master of the Staffordshire witches", he said that his grandparents had abandoned the Craft and converted to Methodism, for which his great-grandfather had cursed them. He said that his father had practised witchcraft, but that he kept it a secret, and made his wife promise to not tell his son, Robert. Despite her oath, according to Cochrane, after his father's death, her mother did in fact tell him, at which he embraced his heritage. He asserted that his Aunt Lucy actually taught him all about the faith. However, these claims would later be denounced by members of his own family. His nephew, Martin Lloyd, has refuted that the family were ever Witches, insisting that they were Methodists, while his wife Jane also later asserted that Cochrane's claims to have come from a hereditary Witch-Cult were fallacious.

== Founding the Clan of Tubal Cain ==
Cochrane formed his second coven, which provided the basis for the Clan of Tubal Cain, in the early 1960s. Searching for members, he placed an advert in the Manchester Guardian requesting that anyone interested in Graves' The White Goddess contact him; he received a response from the schoolteacher Ronald Milland White, known to his friends as "Chalky". White then introduced him to George Arthur Stannard (also known as George Winter), who ran a betting shop near Kings Cross in Central London. White and Stannard joined this nascent coven, the latter taking up the position of Summoner. Describing his creation of his Witchcraft tradition, later Maid of the Clan Shani Oates remarked that "Like any true craftsman, he was able to mold raw material into a magical synthesis, creating a marvelous working system, at once instinctively true and intrinsically beautiful."

The group performed their rituals either at Cochrane's house, or, more often, at Burnham Beeches, though they also performed rituals at the South Downs, after which they would stay the night at Doreen Valiente's flat in Brighton.

=== Cochrane's Craft ===
The Clan of Tubal Cain revere a Horned God and Fate, expressed as the Pale Faced Goddess, named Hekate. The Goddess was viewed as "the White Goddess", a term taken from Robert Graves' book of the same name. The God was associated with fire, the underworld and time, and was described as "the goat-god of fire, craft, lower magics, fertility and death". The God was known by several names, most notable Tubal Cain, Bran, Wayland and Herne. Cochrane's tradition held that these two deities had a son, the Horn Child, who was a young sun god.

While there were some similarities to this and early Wicca, differences between the two also existed, for instance, Gardnerians always worked skyclad, or naked, whereas Cochrane's followers wore black hooded robes. Similarly, Cochrane's coven did not practice scourging, as Gardner's did. Cochrane himself disliked Gardner and the Gardnerians and often ridiculed them, even coining the term "Gardnerian" himself.

Whilst they used ritual tools, they differed somewhat from those used by Gardner's coven. The main five tools in Cochrane's Craft were a ritual knife, a staff known as a stang (according to Ronald Hutton's Triumph of the Moon, Bowers is responsible for the introduction of this into Wicca), a cup, a stone (used as a whetstone to sharpen the knife), and a ritual cord worn by the coven members. Cochrane never made use of a Book of Shadows or similar such books, but worked from a "traditional way of doing things", which was both "spontaneous and shamanistic". Valiente notes that this spontaneity was partly because the Cochrane coven did not use a Book of Shadows in which structured rituals were pre-recorded, leading to more creativity.

== Cochrane's later years ==
"I am a witch descended from a family of witches. Genuine witchcraft is not paganism, though it retains the memory of ancient faiths... [Witchcraft is] the last real mystery cult to survive, with a very complex and evolved philosophy that has strong affinities with many Christian beliefs. The concept of a sacrificial god was not new to the ancient world; it is not new to a witch... I come from an old witch family. My mother told me of things that had been told to her grandmother by her grandmother. I have two ancestors who died by hanging for the practice of witchcraft."

— Cochrane, "Genuine Witchcraft is Defended", 1963.

Cochrane arose to public prominence in November 1963, when he published an article titled "Genuine Witchcraft is Defended" in Psychic News, a weekly Spiritualist publication. In it, he outlined his beliefs regarding Witchcraft, and first publicly made the claim that he came from a hereditary line of Witches.

In 1964, further individuals joined the Clan. Among these was Evan John Jones, who would later become the Magister of The Clan of Tubal Cain, and an accomplished author upon the subject of witchcraft. Jones had met Cochrane through his wife Jane, as they both worked at the same company.

=== Witchcraft Research Association and Gardnerianism ===
His friend and correspondent, the Qabbalist and ceremonial magician William G. Gray introduced him to John Math, a practising Witch and the son of the Earl of Gainsborough. Math joined the Clan, and invited Cochrane to publish some of his articles in Pentagram, the newsletter of the Witchcraft Research Association (WRA), which Math had recently co-founded along with Sybil Leek.

Cochrane took a particularly hostile attitude toward the Gardnerian tradition of Wicca, deeming its founder, Gerald Gardner, to be a con man and sexual deviant. He referred to the tradition as "Gardnerism" and its adherents as "Gardnerians", the latter of which would become the standard term for such practitioners. Upon examining Cochrane's writings, Pagan studies scholar Ethan Doyle White has identified four possible reasons for this animosity. First, Cochrane disliked the publicity seeking that a variety of prominent Gardnerians (among them Gardner, Patricia Crowther, Eleanor Bone, and Monique Wilson), had embarked on; they appeared on television and in tabloid newspapers to present their tradition as the face of Wicca in Britain, which angered Cochrane, whose own tradition differed from Gardnerism in focus. Second, Cochrane disliked Gardnerism's focus on ritual liturgy and magic, instead of emphasising a mystical search for gnosis, while third, Cochrane appeared jealous of the success that Gardnerism had achieved, which was far in advance of that achieved by his own tradition. The fourth point purported by Doyle White was that Cochrane might have been hostile to Gardnerism as a result of a poor experience with it in the past.

=== Doreen Valiente and the Clan's break-up ===
In 1964 Cochrane met Doreen Valiente, who had formerly been a High Priestess of the Gardnerian Bricket Wood coven, through mutual friends which he had met at a gathering at Glastonbury Tor held by the Brotherhood of the Essenes. The two became friends, and Valiente joined the Clan of Tubal Cain. She later remarked that there were certain things in this coven that were better than those in Gardner's, for instance she thought that "[Cochrane] believed in getting close to nature as few Gardnerian witches at that time seemed to do". She also commented on how Cochrane did not seem to want much publicity, as Gardner had, something she admired. However, she eventually became dissatisfied with Cochrane over some of his practices.

Cochrane often insulted and mocked Gardnerian witches, which annoyed Valiente. This reached such an extreme that at one point in 1966 he called for "a Night of the Long Knives of the Gardnerians", at which point Valiente in her own words, "rose up and challenged him in the presence of the rest of the coven. I told him that I was fed up with listening to all this senseless malice, and that, if a 'Night of the Long Knives' was what his sick little soul craved, he could get on with it, but he could get on with it alone, because I had better things to do." She left the coven and never came back.

After Doreen's departure, Cochrane committed adultery with a new woman who had joined the coven, and, according to other coven members, did not care that his wife Jane knew. In May 1966, Jane left Cochrane, initiating divorce proceedings and considering performing a death rite against her husband involving the sacrifice of a black cockerel. Without her, the coven collapsed.

Cochrane was also aware of Charles Cardell, who ran his own coven in Suffolk, but disliked him.

=== Joseph Wilson and the 1734 Tradition, c. 1973 ===
In December 1965 to April 1966, Cochrane corresponded with an American witch named Joseph Wilson. Wilson formed a new tradition, known as the 1734 Tradition based upon teachings of Ruth Wynn Owen, a tradition taught by a man he refers to as Sean, and Robert Cochrane's teaching.

The numerological number '1724' (a possible misprint in the book), was explained by Doreen Valiente in her 1989 book The Rebirth of Witchcraft. Valiente claimed that Cochrane had given the journalist Justine Glass a photograph of a copper platter with '1724' printed on it for her 1965 book Witchcraft, the Sixth Sense – and Us. He had told Glass that it depicted a witch's ritual bowl that had been in his family for many centuries. Valiente revealed that this was a lie by Cochrane – she had herself, in fact, bought that very item for him only the year before in a Brighton antiques shop to be used in a ritual.

=== Death, 1966 ===
Cochrane ingested belladonna and Librium on Midsummer eve 1966, and died nine days later in hospital without recovering consciousness. He left a suicide note expressing his intent to kill himself "while of sound mind".

== Personal life ==
Valiente described Cochrane as "a remarkable man", asserting that he "had something" which could be termed "magical power, charisma or what you will. He may have been devious; but he was no charlatan."

== Legacy ==
According to Jonathan Tapsell, Cochrane was "an unsung giant of modern Wicca" due to the fact that he "gave inspiration to those who came later to escape the narrow confines of Gardner's philosophy". Michael Howard considered him to be "one of the most fascinating, enigmatic and controversial figures of the modern Craft revival". John of Monmouth claimed that Cochrane was "the man behind, what is now called, 'Traditional Witchcraft '". Historian Ethan Doyle White asserted that Cochrane left behind "an ever-expanding legacy", noting that by the 21st century, he had become an "almost tutelary figure" within the Traditional Witchcraft movement, and warrants the title of "Father of Traditional Witchcraft" more than any other occultist. Elsewhere, Doyle White asserted that Cochrane had been "without doubt the most influential" of Gardner's rivals in the mid-20th century Wiccan movement.

Following Cochrane's death, the Mantle of Magister of the Clan of Tubal Cain was given to Evan John Jones. Another of Cochrane's initiates, Evan John Jones wrote a book, Witchcraft: A Tradition Renewed (a collaboration with Doreen Valiente) outlining his version of the Cochrane tradition. Whilst there was no objective way to validate Cochrane's claim to be a hereditary witch, the experience of being in his coven was that of being one of "Diana's darling crew" (Jones, cited in Clifton, 2006).

A group called The Regency was formed by Ronald "Chalky" White and his friend, George Winter, to preserve and continue Cochrane's tradition; it eventually disbanded in 1978 but recently a website has been set up to preserve The Regency memory.

Following correspondence with Cochrane in the mid 1960s, an American named Joseph Wilson founded a tradition called the 1734 Tradition, based on his teachings circa 1974.

A similarly Cochrane-inspired tradition was the Roebuck, an inner mystery of the godhead whose lore is also used by the "Ancient Keltic Church".

There are currently two groups operating under the title of Clan of Tubal Cain. Each has its own interpretation and expression of the legacy of Robert Cochrane, although they may not necessarily completely agree with each other.

== Published writings ==
Cochrane did not write any books in his lifetime, though some of his collected writings and letters have been assembled since his death:

- The Roebuck in the Thicket: An Anthology of the Robert Cochrane Witchcraft Tradition, Capall Bann Publishing, 2001
- The Robert Cochrane Letters: An Insight into Modern Traditional Witchcraft, Capall Bann Publishing, 2002

Other works have been published about Cochrane based upon his teachings, and on his Craft, or based upon his ideas

- Sacred Mask, Sacred Dance by Evan John Jones with Chas S. Clifton, Llewellyn, 1997
- Witchcraft, A Tradition Renewed, by Evan John Jones with Doreen Valiente, Hale, 1989
- " The Star Crossed Serpent Vol One by Evan John Jones, Edited by Shani Oates, Mandrake of Oxford 2011
- " The Star crossed Serpent Vol Two by Shani Oates, Mandrake of Oxford, 2012
- " The People of Goda by Shani Oates, Create Space, 2012
- " Tubelo's Green Fire by Shani Oates, Mandrake of Oxford, 2010
- " The Arcane Veil by Shani Oates, Mandrake of Oxford, 2011
