= Evan John Jones =

Evan John Jones may refer to:

- Evan John Jones (politician) (1872–1952), American Republican politician
- Evan John Jones (witch) (1936–2003), English occultist
