= Wicca (disambiguation) =

Wicca is a nature-based religion.

Wicca(n) may also refer to:

- Wicca (etymology)
- Wicca (book series) or Sweep, a book series by Cate Tiernan
- Wiccan (character), a Marvel comic book superhero

== See also ==
- Wiccia or Hwicce, an Anglo-Saxon tribe
