= Evan John Jones (witch) =

English traditional witch and occultist

- Jones in later life. Photograph by Ann and Dave Finnin.
- Born: 1936
- Died: 2003 (aged 66–67); Brighton, England
- Spouse: Val Jones

Evan John Jones (1936–2003) was an English traditional witch, occultist and writer who operated within the tradition of Cochrane's Craft.

== Early life ==
An engineer, he served in the Army as a young man and saw active duty as a paratrooper in the Suez Crisis of 1956 and fighting communist insurgents in Malaya.

== Career ==
Following Robert Cochrane's death in 1966, he served as the second Magister of the Clan of Tubal Cain from 1966 to 1998.

== Publications ==
During his lifetime, he authored two books on the subject of the Craft, Witchcraft: A Tradition Renewed (1990) and Sacred Mask, Sacred Dance (1996), the latter co-written with American Pagan studies scholar Chas S. Clifton.

== See also ==
- Wicca
- Robert Cochrane (witch)
