= Neopagan witchcraft =

Group of neopagan traditions

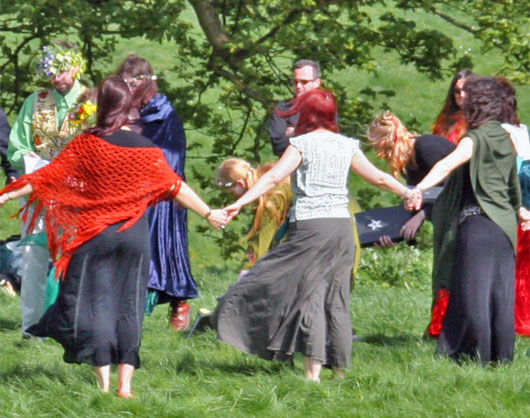
Gathering of Witches for a handfasting ceremony at Avebury in England

Neopagan witchcraft, sometimes referred to as The Craft, is an umbrella term for some neo-pagan traditions that include the practice of magic. They usually incorporate nature worship, divination, and herbalism. These traditions began in the mid-20th century, and many were influenced by the witch-cult hypothesis, a now-rejected theory that persecuted witches in Europe had actually been followers of a surviving pagan religion. The largest and most influential of these movements was Wicca. Some other groups and movements describe themselves as "Traditional Witchcraft" to distinguish themselves from Wicca. Religious studies scholars class the various neopagan witchcraft traditions under the broad category of 'Wicca', although many within Traditional Witchcraft do not accept that title.

In Western anglophone countries, these neopagans, as well as some followers of New Age belief systems, may self-identify as "witches" and use the term "witchcraft" for their self-help, healing, and divination rituals. Their meaning of "witchcraft" is distinct from the traditional and historical meaning of the term, i.e. malevolent magic. Other neopagans avoid the term due to its negative connotations.

== Origins ==
Historical pagan societies usually had a belief in both helpful and harmful magic. Pagan Rome, for example, had laws against malevolent magic. In English, malevolent magic became known as "witchcraft" or black magic, while its benevolent counterpart became known as white magic or the cunning craft. In medieval and early modern Europe, practitioners of helpful magic provided services such as breaking the effects of witchcraft, healing, divination, finding lost or stolen goods, and love magic. In Britain they were commonly known as cunning folk or wise people. Alan McFarlane writes, "There were a number of interchangeable terms for these practitioners, 'white', 'good', or 'unbinding' witches, blessers, wizards, sorcerers, however 'cunning-man' and 'wise-man' were the most frequent". Historian Owen Davies says the term "white witch" was rarely used before the 20th century. Ronald Hutton uses the general term "service magicians". These magic-workers were at least nominally Christians, and were often involved in identifying alleged witches.

In the 1920s, the witch-cult hypothesis gained increasing attention in occult circles when it was popularized by Margaret Murray. The witch-cult hypothesis was the idea that those persecuted as witches were not workers of harmful magic, but followers of a pagan religion (the "Old Religion") that had survived the Christianization of Europe. This has been proven untrue by further historical research. Though the theory of accused witches being followers of a pagan religion was discredited in academia, it became popular among the general public and spurred renewed interest in witchcraft.

From the 1930s, occult neopagan groups began to emerge who re-defined the term 'witchcraft' and applied it to their religion. They were initiatory secret societies inspired by Murray's witch cult theory, ceremonial magic, Aleister Crowley's Thelema, and historical paganism. The earliest group was the Bricket Wood coven of English occultist Gerald Gardner. Gardner said he had been initiated by a group of pagan witches, the New Forest coven, who he said were one of the few remnants of this pagan witch cult. His story is disputed by academics. Gardner's neopagan witchcraft religion, later known as Wicca, adopted many of the traditions ascribed to Murray's witch cult.

Gerald Gardner was not the only person who believed they were a member of a surviving pagan witch-cult. Others such as Sybil Leek, Charles Cardell, Raymond Howard, Rolla Nordic, Robert Cochrane and Paul Huson also said they had been initiated by surviving witch covens. They considered themselves to be following "hereditary" or "traditional" forms of pagan witchcraft.

English historian Ronald Hutton notes that neopagan witchcraft is "the only full-formed religion which England can be said to have given the world."

Following its establishment in Britain, Gardnerian Wicca was brought to the U.S. in the early 1960s by English initiate Raymond Buckland and his then-wife Rosemary, who together founded a coven in Long Island. In the U.S., numerous new variants of Wicca then developed.

== Wicca ==
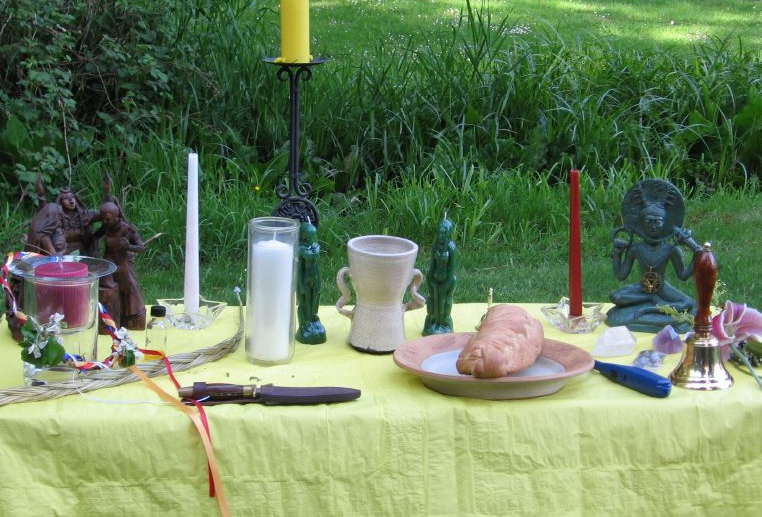
A Wiccan altar erected at Beltane

Wicca is a syncretic modern pagan religion that draws upon a diverse set of ancient pagan and modern hermetic motifs for its theological structure and ritual practices. Developed in England in the first half of the 20th century, Wicca was popularised in the 1950s and early 1960s by Gerald Gardner. Gardner was a retired British civil servant, and an amateur anthropologist and historian who had a broad familiarity with pagan religions, esoteric societies and occultism in general. At the time, Gardner called it the "Witch Cult" and "Witchcraft", and referred to its adherents as "the Wica". From the 1960s onward, the name of the religion was normalised to "Wicca".

Various forms of Wicca are now practised as a religion with positive ethical principles, organised into autonomous covens and led by a High Priesthood. A survey published in 2000 cited just over 200,000 people who reported practicing Wicca in the United States. There is also "Eclectic Wicca", a movement of individuals and groups who share key Wiccan beliefs but have no formal link with traditional Wiccan covens. While some Wiccans call themselves witches, others avoid the term due to its negative connotations.

=== Gardnerian Wicca ===
Gardnerian Wicca, or Gardnerian Witchcraft, is the oldest tradition of Wicca. The tradition is itself named after Gerald Gardner (1884–1964). Gardner formed the Bricket Wood coven and in turn initiated many Witches who founded further covens, continuing the initiation of more Wiccans in the tradition. The term "Gardnerian" was probably coined by Robert Cochrane, who himself left that tradition to found his own.

=== Alexandrian Wicca ===
Alexandrian Wicca is the tradition founded by Alex Sanders (also known as "King of the Witches") who, with his wife Maxine Sanders, established it in Britain in the 1960s. Alexandrian Wicca is similar to and largely based upon Gardnerian Wicca, in which Sanders was trained to the first degree of initiation. It also contains elements of ceremonial magic and Qabalah, which Sanders studied independently. It is one of Wicca's most widely recognized traditions.

=== Eclectic Wicca ===
While the origins of modern Wiccan practice lie in coven activity and the careful handing on of practices to a small number of initiates, since the 1970s a widening public appetite made this unsustainable. From about that time, larger, more informal, often publicly advertised camps and workshops began to take place and it has been argued that this more informal but more accessible method of passing on the tradition is responsible for the rise of eclectic Wicca. Eclectic Wiccans are more often than not solitary practitioners. Some of these solitaries do, however, attend gatherings and other community events, but reserve their spiritual practices (Sabbats, Esbats, spell-casting, worship, magical work, etc.) for when they are alone. Eclectic Wicca is the most popular variety of Wicca in America and eclectic Wiccans now significantly outnumber lineaged Wiccans; their beliefs and practices tend to be much more varied.

== Traditional Witchcraft ==
Some strands of neopagan witchcraft refer to themselves as "Traditional Witchcraft", "Traditional Pagan Witchcraft"', or the "Traditional Craft". Their beliefs and practices are similar to Wicca, but they use these terms to differentiate themselves from mainstream Wicca. They may wish to practice neopagan witchcraft differently from mainstream Wicca and outside national Wiccan networks. Religious studies scholars consider these traditions to fall under the umbrella or broad category of Wicca; treating Wicca as a religion with denominations in the same way Christianity has denominations like Catholicism and Protestantism. Religious studies scholar Ethan Doyle White described Traditional Witchcraft as:

a broad movement of aligned magico-religious groups who reject any relation to Gardnerianism and the wider Wiccan movement, claiming older, more "traditional" roots. Although typically united by a shared aesthetic rooted in European folklore, the Traditional Craft contains within its ranks a rich and varied array of occult groups, from those who follow a contemporary Pagan path that is suspiciously similar to Wicca, to those who adhere to Luciferianism.

=== Cochrane's Craft ===
Genuine Witchcraft is Defended

I am a witch descended from a family of witches. Genuine witchcraft is not paganism, though it retains the memory of ancient faiths.

It is a religion mystical in approach and puritanical in attitudes. It is the last real mystery cult to survive, with a very complex and evolved philosophy that has strong affinities with many Christian beliefs. The concept of a sacrificial god was not new to the ancient world; it is not new to a witch.

— Roy Bowers incognito, November 1963 issue of Psychic News

Roy Bowers, a.k.a. Robert Cochrane (1931–1966), founded a strand of neopagan witchcraft known as "Cochrane's Craft", in opposition to Gardnerian Wicca. Cochrane's Clan of Tubal Cain worshipped a Horned God and a Triple Goddess, much akin to Gardner's Bricket Wood Coven. Cochrane himself disliked Gardner and his strand of Wicca, and often ridiculed him and his tradition. While Cochrane's Craft uses ritual tools, they differ somewhat from those used by Gardnerians, some being the ritual knife (known as an athamé), a staff (known as a stang), a cup (or commonly a chalice), a stone (used as a whetstone to sharpen the athame), and a ritual cord worn by coven members.

At a gathering at Glastonbury Tor held by the Brotherhood of the Essenes in 1964, Cochrane met Doreen Valiente, who had formerly been a High Priestess of Gardner's Bricket Wood Coven. The two became friends, and Valiente joined the Clan of Tubal Cain. Cochrane often insulted and mocked Gardnerians, which annoyed Valiente. This reached an extreme in that even at one point in 1966 he called for "a Night of the Long Knives of the Gardnerians", at which point Valiente "rose up and challenged him in the presence of the rest of the coven".

=== Feri Tradition ===
The Feri Tradition (not to be confused with Faery, Fairy, Faerie, or Vicia, which are different traditions) is an ecstatic (rather than fertility) tradition founded by Cora and Victor Anderson. Scholars of Paganism like Joanne Pearson and Ethan Doyle White have characterised Feri as a Wiccan tradition. The latter noted however that some neopagans restrict the term Wicca to British Traditional Wicca, in which case Feri would not be classified as Wicca; he deemed this exclusionary definition of the term to be "unsuitable for academic purposes". Instead, he characterised Feri as one form of Wicca which is nevertheless distinct from others.

=== Sabbatic Craft ===
The Sabbatic Craft is described by its founder Andrew D. Chumbley as "an initiatory line of spirit-power that can inform all who are receptive to its impetus, and which – when engaged with beyond names – may be understood as a Key unto the Hidden Design of Arte." Chumbley sometimes referred to the Nameless Faith, Crooked Path, and Via Tortuosa. He reserved "Sabbatic Craft" as a unifying term to refer to the "convergent lineages" of the "Cultus Sabbati," a body of neopagan witchcraft initiates.

Chumbley's works and those of Daniel Schulke on the Cultus Sabbati's "ongoing tradition of sorcerous wisdom" continue to serve as the prototypical reference works. The craft is not an ancient, pre-Christian tradition surviving into the modern age. It is a tradition rooted in "cunning-craft," a patchwork of older magical practice and later Christian mythology.

'Sabbatic Craft' describes a corpus of magical practices which self-consciously utilize the imagery and mythos of the "Witches' Sabbath" as a cipher of ritual, teaching and gnosis. This is not the same as saying that one practises the self-same rituals in the self-same manner as the purported early modern "witches" or historically attested cunning folk, rather it points toward the fact that the very mythos which had been generated about both "witches" and their "ritual gatherings" has been appropriated and re-orientated by contemporary successors of cunning-craft observance, and then knowingly applied for their own purposes.

— Andrew Chumbley defining Sabbatic Craft

In his grimoire Azoëtia, Chumbley incorporated diverse iconography from ancient Sumerian, Egyptian, Yezidi, and Aztec cultures. He spoke of a patchwork of ancestral and tutelary spirit folklore which he perceived amidst diverse "Old Craft" traditions in Britain as "a gnostic faith in the Divine Serpent of Light, in the Host of the Gregori, in the Children of Earth sired by the Watchers, in the lineage of descent via Lilith, Mahazael, Cain, Tubal-cain, Naamah, and the Clans of the Wanderers." Schulke believed that folk and cunning-crafts of Britain absorbed multicultural elements from "Freemasonry, Bible divination, Romany charms, and other diverse streams," what Chumbley called "dual-faith observance," referring to a "co-mingling of ‘native’ forms of British magic and Christianity".

=== Stregheria ===
An Italian neopagan religion similar to Wicca emerged in the 1970s, known as Stregheria. While Wicca was inspired by Murray's witch cult, Stregheria closely resembles Charles Leland's controversial account of an Italian pagan witchcraft religion, which he wrote about in Aradia, or the Gospel of the Witches (1899). Its followers worship the Goddess Diana, her brother Dianus/Lucifer, and their daughter Aradia. They do not see Lucifer as the evil Satan that Christians see, but a benevolent god of the Sun.

== Feminism ==
Wiccans often consider their beliefs to be in line with liberal ideals such as the Green movement, and particularly with feminism, by providing young women with what they see as a means for self-empowerment, control of their own lives, and a way of influencing the world around them. Feminist ideals are prominent in some branches of Wicca, such as Dianic Wicca, which has a tradition of women-led and women-only groups. The 2002 study Enchanted Feminism: The Reclaiming Witches of San Francisco suggests that some branches of Wicca include influential members of the second wave of feminism, which has also been redefined as a religious movement. As of 2006, many within British Traditional Wicca do not believe that feminist Witches should be called Wiccan.

Reclaiming is a tradition of feminist neopagan witchcraft. It is an international community of women and men working to combine neopagan witchcraft, the Goddess movement, earth-based spirituality, and political activism. The tradition developed in the classes and rituals of its predecessor, the Reclaiming Collective (1978–1997). It was founded in 1979, amidst the peace and anti-nuclear movements, by two neopagan women of Jewish descent, Starhawk (Miriam Simos) and Diane Baker, to explore and develop feminist neopagan emancipatory rituals. Today, the organization focuses on progressive social, political, environmental and economic activism.

Deborah Willis writes that "the magical practices of modern feminist and New Age witches closely resemble those of early modern cunning folk", whose work involved thwarting witchcraft. Yet she notes that the ideology of these neopagan movements "would be quite alien to the sixteenth-century cunning woman, whose magical beliefs coexisted comfortably with her Christian ones".

== Media ==
Some of the recent growth in Wicca has been attributed to popular media such as Charmed, Buffy the Vampire Slayer, and the Harry Potter series, with their depictions of "positive witchcraft", which differs from the historical, traditional, and Indigenous definitions. A case study, "Mass Media and Religious Identity: A Case Study of Young Witches", found that the portrayal of positive witchcraft in popular culture is one reason young people are choosing to become Wiccans or self-identify as witches. The Internet is also thought to be driving growth in Wicca.

== Demographics ==
Neopagan witchcraft has been extremely difficult to pinpoint due to many religious surveys grouping it with general Paganism, stigmatization from much of the outside world, poor public opinion, and the secrecy prevalent among neopagan witches (and Pagans as a whole). This causes the demographics to fluctuate drastically and become difficult to track. Establishing exact numbers pertaining to witchcraft is difficult. Nevertheless, there is a slow growing body of data on the subject.

=== United States ===
Based on studies conducted in the United States, all that can be said accurately of the growth rate of neopagan witchcraft in the U.S. is that "as of 2001 the ARIS organization reports that contemporary witchcraft saw a 1.575% growth rate between 1990 and 2001, effectively a doubling of adherents every two years." The limited tracking by ARIS has kept Neopagan Witchcraft from being continually and accurately tracked. However, there have been spikes over the years. These are attributed to growth as well as an increase in practitioner's willingness to report, and increasingly positive views of Wicca in America.

Based on the most recent survey by the Pew Research Center, conducted in 2014, there are approximately 1 million Pagans in the United States, comprising 0.3% of the population.

According to Dr. Helen A. Berger's 1995 survey, "The Pagan Census", most American Pagans are middle class, educated, and live in urban/suburban areas on the East and West coasts.

=== Singapore ===
Singaporean practitioners of neopagan witchcraft from diverse ethnic background, mostly the Wiccan, mainly in the form of online groups, classes, spiritual consultations, and the sale of amulets and other tools.

== See also ==
- Aleister Crowley bibliography
- Babalon – Goddess in Thelema
- English qaballa – English Qaballa system of James Lees
- Enochian magic – System of Renaissance magic
- European witchcraft – Belief in witchcraft in Europe
- Goetia (magic) – Invocation of demons
- Great rite – Wiccan ritual
- Lunar deity – Deity that represents the Moon
- Magical organization – Organization for the practice of occult magic
- Priestess – Women's ordination in religious groups
- The Thunder, Perfect Mind – Text in the Nag Hammadi library
- Semitic neopaganism – Religions attempting to reconstruct ancient Semitic religions, which may include traditions of Jewish witchcraft
- Worship of heavenly bodies – Worship of stars and other heavenly bodies as deities
