= Witch (word) =

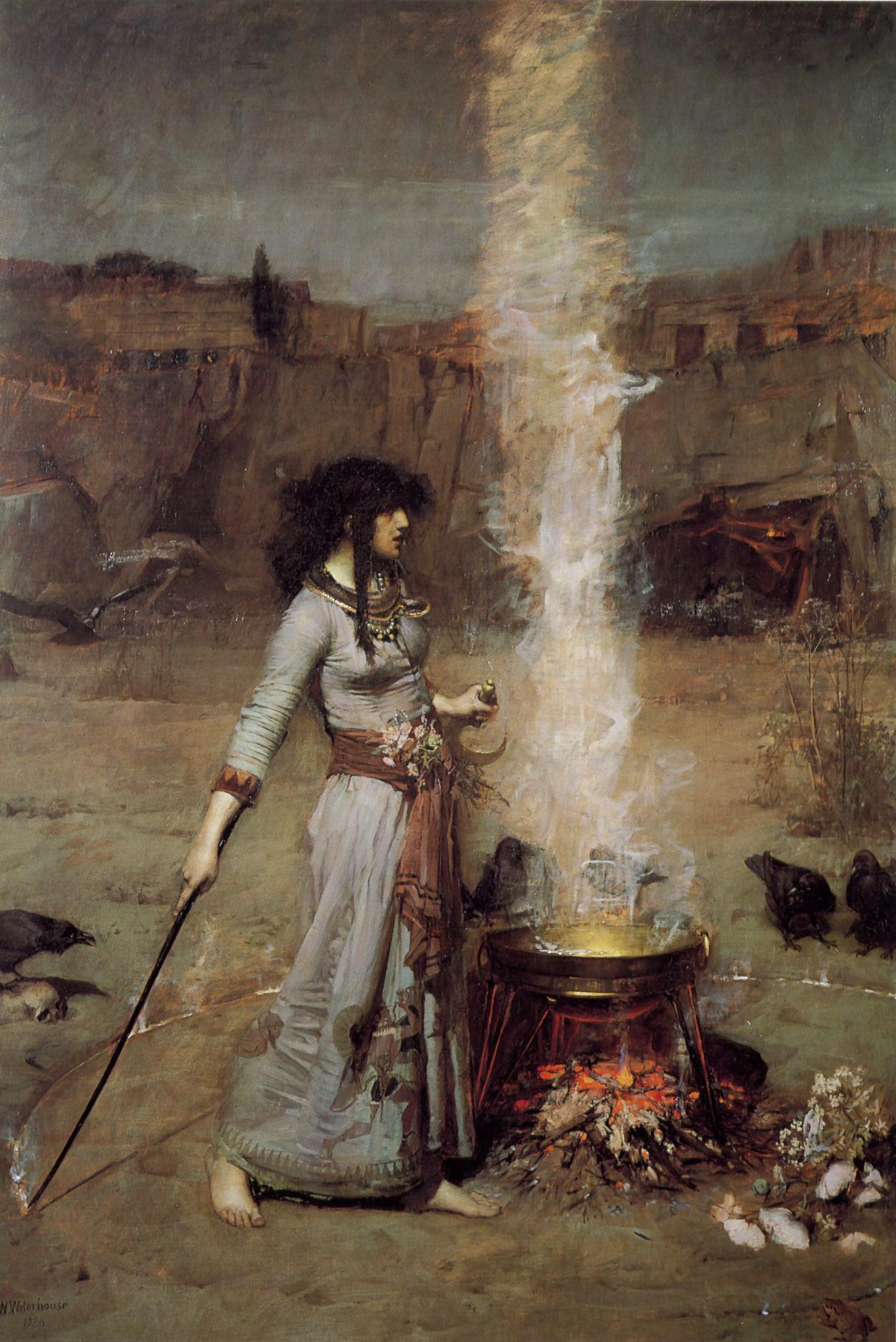
The Magic Circle by John William Waterhouse (1886)

The English word witch, from the Old English wiċċe, is a term rooted in European folklore and superstition for a practitioner of witchcraft, magic or sorcery. Traditionally associated with malevolent magic, with those accused of witchcraft being the target of witch-hunts, in the modern era the term has taken on different meanings. In literature, a 'witch' can now simply refer to an alluring woman capable of 'bewitching' others. In neopagan religions such as Wicca the term has meanwhile been adopted as a label for adherents of all genders.

== Etymology ==
The modern spelling witch with the medial 't' first appears in the 16th century. Old English had both masculine (wicca) and feminine (wicce) forms of the word, but the masculine meaning became less common in Standard English, being replaced by words like "warlock" and "wizard".

The origins of the word are Germanic, rooted in the Old English verb wiccian, which has a cognate in Middle Low German wicken (attested from the 13th century, besides wichelen 'to bewitch').

The Brothers Grimm's Deutsches Wörterbuch connects the "Ingvaeonic word" *wikkōn with Gothic weihs 'sacred' (Proto-Indo European (PIE) *weik- 'to separate, to divide', probably via early Germanic practices of cleromancy such as those reported by Tacitus).

R. Lühr connects wigol 'prophetic, mantic', wīglian 'to practice divination' (Middle Low German wichelen 'bewitch', wicker 'soothsayer') and suggests Proto-Germanic *wigōn, geminated (cf. Kluge's law) to *wikkōn. The basic form would then be the feminine, wicce < *wikkæ < *wikkōn with palatalization due to the preceding i and the following *æ < *ōn in early Ingvaeonic. The palatal -cc- /t͡ʃ/ in wicca would then be analogous to the feminine.

=== Related terms ===
Another Old English word for 'witch' was hægtes or hægtesse, which became the modern English word "hag" and is linked to the word "hex". In most other Germanic languages, their word for 'witch' comes from the same root as these; for example German Hexe and Dutch heks. Its proto-Germanic form is reconstructed as *hagatusjon, whose origin is unclear.

The adjective 'wicked' and noun 'wickedness' apparently derive from the Old English wiċċa ('male witch').

== History ==
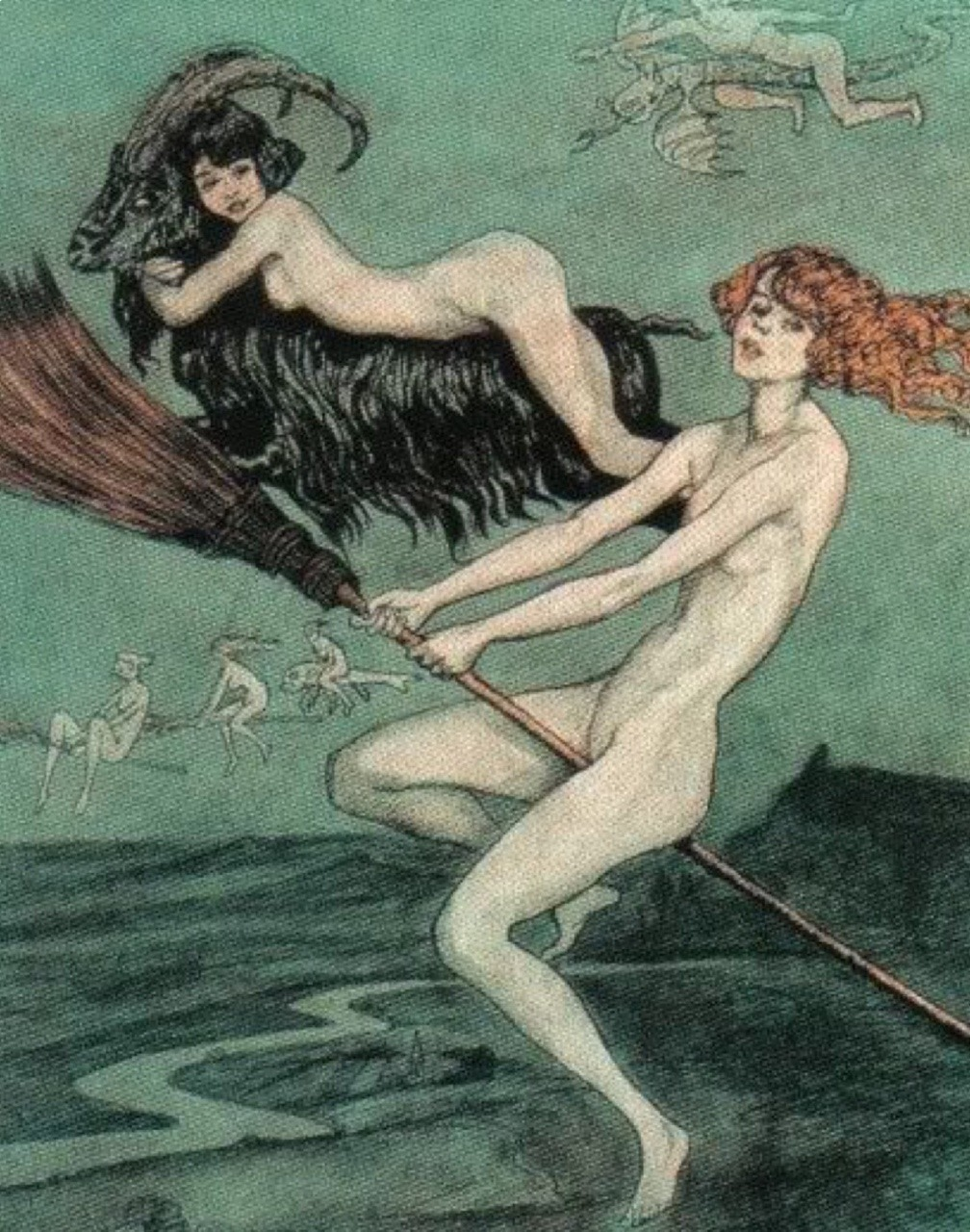
Riding Witches by Otto Goetze

=== Middle Ages ===
The earliest recorded use of the word "witch" is in the Laws of Ælfred, which date to about 890:

Tha faemnan, the gewuniath onfon gealdorcraeftigan and scinlaecan and wiccan, ne laet thu tha libban.

Translation:

Women who are accustomed to receiving enchanters and sorceresses and witches, do not let them live!

In the homilies of the Old English grammarian Ælfric, dating to the late 10th century we find:

Ne sceal se cristena befrinan tha fulan wiccan be his gesundfulnysse.

Translation:

A Christian should not consult foul witches concerning his prosperity.

The word wicca also appears in Halitgar's earlier Latin Penitential, but only once in the phrase swa wiccan tæcaþ ('as the witches teach'), which seems to be an addition to Halitgar's original, added by an 11th-century Old English translator.

In Old English glossaries the words wicce and wicca are used to gloss such Latin terms as augur, hariolus, conjector, and pythonyssa, all of which mean 'diviner, soothsayer'.

=== Early modern period ===
Johannes Nider and other 15th century writers used the Latin term maleficus to mean witch—a person who performed maleficium, harmful acts of sorcery, against others. The introduction of the idea of demonic forces empowering the acts of maleficium gave the term witch new connotations of idolatry and apostasy that were adopted by Malleus Maleficarum (1486), but these remained disputed despite papal injunctions to take action against witches.

In the Friuli region of Italy, there was agrarian visionary tradition known as the benandanti (literally 'well-farers'), who said that they battled witches, but who inquisitors nevertheless determined were witches themselves.

=== Modern ===
In current colloquial English witch is typically applied to women, with the male equivalent being warlock or wizard. Contemporary dictionaries currently distinguish four meanings of the noun witch, including: a person (especially a woman) credited with malignant supernatural powers; a practitioner of neo-pagan tradition or religion (such as Wicca); a mean or ugly old woman: hag crone; or, a charming or alluring girl or woman. Figurative use to refer to a bewitching young girl begins in the 18th century.

The application of the word in modern times has ties to newer women's movements showing a connection between the many origins of the word to the treatment of women today. An example can be found in Rome during a demonstration against the Italian laws around abortion, around 100,000 women chanted in unison:

La Gioia, la gioia, la si inventa, donne si nasce, le streghe si diventa

Translation:

Joy, joy, joy, is invented, born as a woman, made into a witch

== See also ==
- Etymology of Wicca
