= Cochrane's Craft =

Religious movement similar to Wicca

- Type: Traditional Witchcraft
- Theology: Polytheism; Pluriform monotheism
- Founder: Robert Cochrane (legally Roy Bowers)
- Origin: 1951
- Members: Unknown
- Other name: Cochranianism

Cochrane's Craft, also known as Cochranianism and The Clan of Tubal Cain, is a religious movement similar to Wicca that considers itself a form of traditional witchcraft. It was founded in 1951 by the English witch Robert Cochrane, who himself claimed to have been taught in the tradition by some of his elderly family members, a claim that is disputed by historians such as Ronald Hutton and Leo Ruickbie.

Despite many practical and theological similarities to other forms of Wicca, such as Gardnerian Wicca, Cochrane's Craft sets itself apart from other traditions in many ways, such as its emphasis on the pursuit of wisdom as its highest goal, Cochrane's insistence that it is not a form of paganism, and that it has no more in common with paganism than does Kabbalah.

== History ==
Around the time that the British Witchcraft Act 1735 was repealed in 1951, Cochrane, who was in his early twenties, founded a coven, naming it the Clan of Tubal Cain after the biblical blacksmith Tubal-cain, as a reference to his work in that profession. At first, he worked with Gerald Gardner, the founder of Wicca, but broke with him on creative differences. This created a rivalry that continued through Gardner's death.

Cochrane initiated his wife Jane and several others into the craft, and they then joined the coven. Among these was Evan John Jones, who would one day replace Robert Cochrane as the magister (master) of the Clan of Tubal Cain. Jones had met Cochrane through his wife Jane, as they both worked for the same company. The group performed their rituals either at Cochrane's house, or, more often, at Burnham Beeches, though they also performed rituals at the South Downs, after which they would stay the night at Doreen Valiente's flat in Brighton. According to Kelden, Doreen Valiente, after the schism with Gardner, joined Cochrane in 1964, contributing to the bulk of Cochrane's "Traditional Witchcraft" as she had to Wicca.

In 1966, Robert Cochrane died. Jane, Robert's widow, then named Jones as the magister of the Clan of Tubal Cain. In 1982, two Americans named Dave and Ann Finnin reached out to Gray and Jones. In 1986, after four years of correspondence, Jones adopted the Finnins into the Clan of Tubal Cain and named them the magister and maid of a satellite group called The Roebuck. Later, conflicts arose between Jones and the Finnians, and he ceased communicating with the couple. In 1996, Mike Howard, editor of The Cauldron, introduced Jones to a woman named Shani Oates. In 1998, Jones felt Oates to be the best person to lead the Clan of Tubal Cain and formally named her its maid, giving her "supreme and undivided authority over the whole Clan". Oates then named as her magister Robin the Dart. On the winter solstice of 2017, Oates appointed Ulric Goding as magister of the Clan, as the successor to lead the Clan to future generations.

Describing Cochrane's creation of his religious tradition, Oates remarked that "like any true craftsman, he was able to mold raw material into a magical synthesis, creating a marvelous working system, at once instinctively true and intrinsically beautiful."

== Beliefs ==
=== Theology ===
As in most forms of neopagan witchcraft, Cochranians worship both a Horned God and a Triple Goddess. The Goddess is viewed as the White Goddess, a term taken from Robert Graves's book on poetry, The White Goddess. She is also viewed as a triad of three mothers or three sisters, whom both Cochrane and Evan John Jones noted as having similarities with the weird sisters or Norns of Germanic paganism.

In Cochrane's Craft, the God is associated with fire, the underworld, and time, and has been described as "the goat-god of fire, craft, lower magics, fertility and death". The God was known by several names, most notable Tubal-cain, Brân, Wayland and Herne. Cochrane's tradition held that these two deities had a son, the Horn Child, who was a young sun god.

Cochrane, like Gardner, believed that there was a being beyond the God and the Goddess—the Godhead—though he referred to this deity as "the Hidden Goddess". He also referred to it as "Truth".

Cochrane told of a cosmogynic myth involving Night, "a feminine being with force, but without form, giving birth to man and with him she discovered love, and so all things began". He said that the Elder Gods had seven children who each created a realm to rule over from a castle, as well as creating the elements of earth, air, fire and water, each of which had a god ruling over it.

=== Ethics and morality ===
No mention is made in Cochrane's writings of the Wiccan Rede or "Threefold Law". Cochrane instead offers an "old witch 'law'" that reads:

Do not do what you desire - do what is necessary.
Take all you are given - give all of yourself.
What I have - - - I hold!
When all else is lost, and not until then, prepare to die with dignity.

In a letter to occultist William G. Gray, Cochrane said:

Nothing is purely good or evil, these are relative terms that man has hung upon unacceptable mysteries. To my particular belief the Goddess, white with works of good, is also black with works of darkness, yet both of them are compassionate, albeit the compassion is a cover for the ruthlesness [sic?] of total Truth.

== Practices ==
Cochranians wear robes whilst performing rituals and adhere to the traditional Great Rite.

=== Tools ===
An iconic part of Cochrane's Craft is the tool known as the stang. A stang is a forked staff used primarily as a portable altar. In The Roebuck in the Thicket, Evan John Johns describes the acquisition and adornment of a stang intended for use by a coven. According to Jones, the shaft of the stang should be made from ash; the fork of the stang should be made of iron; the base should be shod in iron; two upward-facing crossed arrows should adorn the shaft below the fork; and, on the four "Great Sabbats" (namely, Candlemas, May Eve, Lammas, and Halloween), the arrows should be garlanded as fits the season. The stang is similar to the tool described in Buckland's book Scottish Witchcraft, but Cochrane is credited with being the first witch to use one.

== Media ==
The 2015 film The Coven used the premise that a ring of trees in Queen's Wood was a meeting place for practitioners of Cochrane's Craft. The plot features a contemporary group of Cochranians who go missing after last being seen among the ring of trees.

== See also ==
- 1734 Tradition
- Gardnerian Wicca
