= Treadwell's Bookshop =

Esoteric bookshop in London

Coordinates: 51°31′11.5″N 0°7′52.3″W

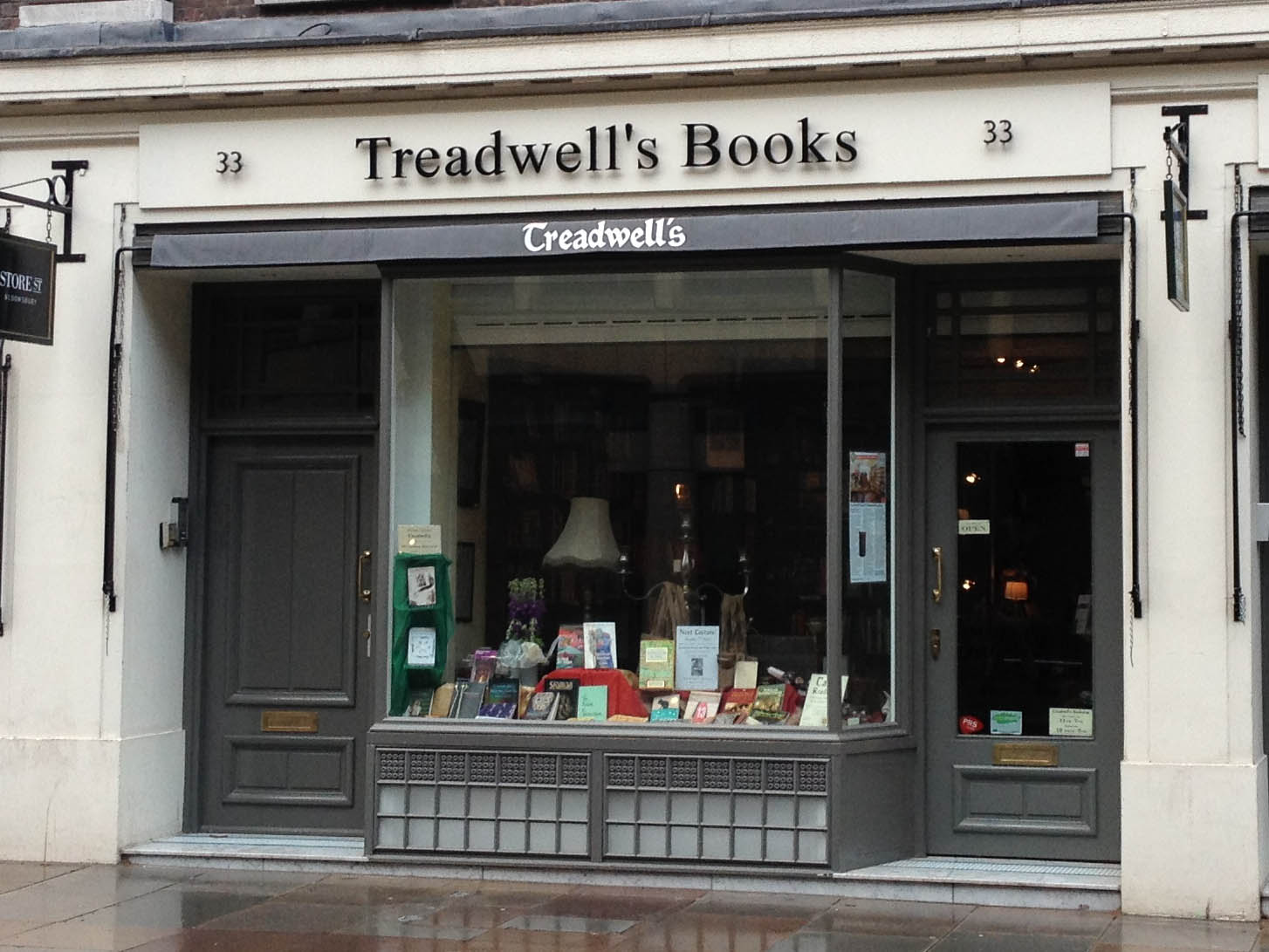
- Type: Independent bookstore
- Founded: 2003
- Headquarters: Store Street, Bloomsbury, London
- Area served: London
- Products: Books, occult supplies
- Services: Esoteric community hub
- Website: www.treadwells-london.com

Treadwell's Bookshop is a shop in Store Street, London, in the Bloomsbury area, which sells esoteric books as well as occult supplies. It originally opened in Covent Garden in 2003 and is one of the small number of esoteric bookshops in London along with the Atlantis Bookshop and Watkins Books. Treadwell's audience includes the trending number of younger urban women interested in witchcraft.

The shop has been described as a "specialist bookshop for the practicing occultist and wizard", and an "esoteric community hub" in London.
