= Justine C. Glass =

English journalist and writer

- Born: Alice Enid Corrall; 14 September 1916; London, England
- Died: 2 December 1968 (aged 52); London, England
- Occupations: Journalist, writer

Alice Enid Corrall (14 September 1916 – 2 December 1968), who wrote under the name Justine C. Glass, was an English journalist and writer.

== Life ==
Glass was born on 14 September 1916 in London to David Roberts a clergyman and Alice Elizabeth Davids. She was educated in Warwickshire and worked at Peter Owen Publishers in Kendrick Mews, South Kensington. She authored many books. Glass was the beauty editor for the Daily Sketch newspaper. In her 1946 book You Shall Have Beauty she advised women to drink eight glasses of water a day between meals to reduce wrinkles.

In 1961, Glass authored a book on diet and longevity claiming that people can live to 180 years old, it was republished in the United States in 1962. She advocated animal source foods including red meat, eggs and fish at every meal with fresh fruit, butter, wholemeal bread, honey and green vegetables. Starch and sugar consumption were to be consumed in limited proportions to other foods and frying food was described as a "lethal weapon" that destroys vitamins. It was negatively reviewed for promoting fanatical and non-scientific claims. A review noted the book contained "a flagrant distortion of fact and fabrication of material" such as yogis getting all the nourishment they need from air. In the book Glass implied that silica is useful to treat cancer. This view was described as "medically unsound" and potentially harmful. Georgia O'Keeffe was influenced by the book.

Glass died on 2 December 1968.

== Witchcraft ==
Glass was a Druid and in 1959 celebrated the September equinox at Primrose Hill, Regent's Park. She had connections to the English witchcraft scene, including the New Forest coven. She lectured on witchcraft.

In October 1964, Glass attended an inaugural meeting of the Witchcraft Research Association and communicated with Doreen Valiente. In 1965 she authored Witchcraft: The Sixth Sense. The book was negatively reviewed by historians for citing credulous claims from occultist Robert Cochrane and others; many of which turned out to be false. It contains a misleading photograph of a copper platter bearing the figures "1724" which Cochrane alleged was a witch heirloom handed down from his family for centuries but was actually a copper dish that Doreen Valiente had bought for him from a Brighton antique shop. Valiente wrote that the book was filled with misprints and "sheer nonsense" and that Glass was a well-meaning woman who had been duped by Cochrane. Historian Leo Ruickbie has described the book's material as "suspect, if not actually worthless".

== Selected publications ==
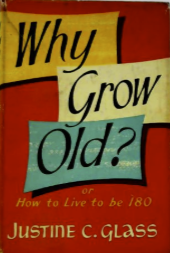
Why Grow Old?: Or, How to Live to be 180, 1962

- You Shall Have Beauty (1946)
- Awkward Age (1956)
- Eat and Stay Young (1961)
- Why Grow Old?: Or, How to Live to be 180 (1962)
- The Story of Biochemistry (1964)
- Witchcraft: The Sixth Sense (1965)
- They Foresaw the Future: The Story of Fulfilled Prophecy (1969)
- Nature's Way to Health (1972)
