= Ann-Marie Gallagher =

British writer

Ann-Marie Gallagher is an author, historian, feminist, witch, and a former senior lecturer at the University of Central Lancashire (UCLan) in England. She has written extensively on her subjects, and appears often on British radio. For years she has been practising, teaching, and broadcasting on witchcraft, Pagan and goddess spirituality, women's studies, magic, gender, and folklore. Her books include Inner Magic: A Guide to Witchcraft, The Way of the Goddess and The Spells Bible: The Definitive Guide to Charms and Enchantments. She was a course leader for Sociology at UCLan in Preston, England. She is married and has three children, and lives in Lancashire, England with her husband.

== Bibliography ==
- Inner Magic: A Guide to Witchcraft by Ann-Marie Gallagher (1 April 2007) MITCH ISBN 1-84533-315-2, ISBN 978-1-84533-315-7
- Magical Spells for Your Home: How to Bring Magic into Every Area of Your Life by Ann-Marie Gallagher (13 October 2002) Collins & Brown ISBN 1-84340-007-3, ISBN 978-1-84340-007-3
- Re-presenting the Past: Women and History by Ann-Marie Gallagher, Cathy Lubelska, and Louise Ryan (24 July 2001) Longman ISBN 0-582-38219-X, ISBN 978-0-582-38219-0
- Spellcraft: Practical Spells for Modern Life by Ann-Marie Gallagher (9 October 2001) Penguin (Non-Classics) ISBN 0-14-219601-0, ISBN 978-0-14-219601-4
- The Spells Bible: The Definitive Guide to Charms and Enchantments by Ann-Marie Gallagher (29 August 2003) Walking Stick Press ISBN 1-58297-244-3, ISBN 978-1-58297-244-2
- Thorsons Way of the Goddess by Ann Marie Gallagher (2000) Thorsons ISBN 978-0-00-711787-1, ISBN 0-00-711787-6
- The Wicca Bible: The Definitive Guide to Magic and the Craft by Ann-Marie Gallagher (1 August 2005) Sterling ISBN 1-4027-3008-X, ISBN 978-1-4027-3008-5

=== Contributor ===
- Daughters of the Goddess: Studies of Healing, Identity, and Empowerment by Wendy Griffin (1999) SAGE Publications Ltd ISBN 0-7619-4831-7

=== Articles ===
- Weaving a Tangled Web?: Pagan Ethics and Issues of History, "Race" and Ethnicity in Pagan Identity – Article in Discus Vol. 6 (2000)
- Woven Apart & Weaving Together: Conflict and Mutuality in Feminist and Pagan Communities in Britain (1999)
