= Raymond Howard (Wiccan) =

English Wiccan fl.1960s

Howard with the Head of Atho

Raymond Howard was an English practitioner of the modern Pagan new religious movement of Wicca. He promoted his tradition, known as the Coven of Atho, through a correspondence course established in the early part of the 1960s.

In the late 1950s, Howard lived in Charlwood, Surrey, where he worked for the psychologist and Wiccan Charles Cardell. After the pair fell out, Howard assisted a journalist from the London Evening News in spying on a nocturnal ritual carried out by Cardell and his coven. In the early 1960s, he established his own correspondence course, the Coven of Atho, through which he provided instruction on his own variant of Wicca, which drew upon that of Cardell and other sources. By the latter part of that decade he was running an antiques shop in Field Dalling, Norfolk, where he stored a wooden carving of the Wiccan Horned God, known as the "Head of Atho". He attracted press attention for the Head, informing both journalists and other Wiccans that it had been passed down to him by pre-existing Witches, although his son later revealed it to be a forgery created by Howard himself. In April 1967 the head was stolen, perhaps by Cardell, and never recovered. Much more on Ray Howard and his life can be found in the 2022 book Here Be Magick by Melissa Seims.

== Biography ==
In the late 1950s, Howard lived with his first wife in Ricketts Wood Cottages in Charlwood, Surrey. This was located near to Dumbledene, the country house of Charles Cardell, a stage conjuror and psychologist for whom Howard worked as a handyman. Cardell and 'Mary Cardell'—a woman whom he erroneously claimed was his sister—ran a company called Dumblecott Magick Productions through which they sold magical potions and related paraphernalia. They were known to prominent British Wiccans like Gerald Gardner and Doreen Valiente, and they had placed an advertisement in the esoteric magazine Light encouraging fellow practitioners of the "Craft of the Wiccens" to contact them.

In 1960, Howard broke from Cardell. He subsequently divorced his wife, with Mary Cardell providing evidence against Howard in the divorce proceedings, something which possibly exacerbated Howard's anger toward his former employers. In 1961 he invited a journalist, William Hall of the London Evening News, to spy on a nocturnal Witchcraft ritual that the Cardells were performing in the woods around their home; Hall subsequently published an exposé, "Witchcraft in the Woods", in March 1961. The Cardells subsequently took the newspaper to court, accusing them of libel, during which they claimed that Howard was pathologically dishonest. Several weeks later, Howard received a mirror accompanied by an effigy that had been pierced in the post, and Cardell was summoned to court accused of sending it.

=== The Coven of Atho ===
In the early 1960s, Howard began issuing a correspondence course in a tradition of Wicca that he termed the Coven of Atho; in his position of leadership over the group, he termed himself "The Fish". One subscriber was Valiente, who reached the lowest rank on the course, that of "Sarsen", in 1963. She copied down all of the information provided in the course into a notebook, highlighting that most of it appeared to derive from Dion Fortune's novel The Sea Priestess and Rudolf Koch's The Book of Signs. Other possible sources include Gardner's Witchcraft Today, Charles Leland's Aradia, or the Gospel of the Witches, and Lewis Spence's books on Atlantis. Howard revealed to Valiente that he had drawn elements from the Wiccan tradition practiced by the Cardells, and like their group he promoted a sevenfold system of ethics, although these virtues—presence, truth, kindliness, tolerance, awareness, strength, and perception—differed from those found in Cardell's tradition. It referred to magic with the spelling of "magick", which had been popularised by the occultist Aleister Crowley, and promulgated "Eight Paths of Magick", which was similar to the Eightfold Path taught in Gardnerian Wicca.

By 1967 Howard was exhibiting a variety of witchcraft artefacts in a room above his antique shop in Field Dalling, Norfolk. Among these was the Head of Atho, which was described in a newspaper article as a depiction of "the horned god of witchcraft [which] has been handed down through generations since pre-Christian times". A journalist from the Eastern Daily Press reported on the head in March 1967, stating that it had undergone laboratory tests which had established it to be made out of 2200-year-old English oak. Howard told the reporter that when living in Norwood Hill, Surrey, the race car driver Donald Campbell rubbed the head of Atho for luck before making his attempts to break the world land speed record. In July 2008, Howard's son Peter confirmed to the researcher Melissa Seims that he had witnessed his father constructing the Head, and that it was thus fake. Seims suggested that the design of the head had been inspired by an older folkloric artefact, the Dorset Ooser.

The reporter added that the head was hollow, and that when a lighted candle with a small crucible of water above it was placed inside the back of the head, steam was emitted from the horns while the red glass eyes glowed. Valiente saw the head on her meeting with Howard, describing it as "a very impressive carving, having a crude strength and power which make it a remarkable work of primitive art." According to Valiente, about the head were carvings of foliage, representing "the forces of life and fertility, which Atho personifies." She asserted that the signs of the zodiac were depicted on the horns, with "the five rings of witchcraft" on the forehead. The nose was ornamented with a pentagram, and acted as a cup to hold the Sabbat wine. She stated that the mouth was shaped like a bird, representing the messenger of air, and that the chin was shaped like a triangle, again conveying esoteric meanings. Below this were twin serpents, one representing positive forces and the other negative.

Howard informed the Wiccan Lois Bourne—whom he met when she was holidaying near his second home, an old mill in Cornwall—that the Head of Atho had been in the possession of his family for many generations. Conversely, he told Valiente a different story about its origins: according to this account, Howard was living with relations on a Norfolk farm in 1930 when he met an old lady named Alicia Franch who lived with the Romani Gypsies. Franch allegedly first came across Howard when he was playing by a roadside pond on the summer solstice, and she took an interest in him, instructing him in her witchcraft tradition and leaving him a number of artefacts in her will, including the Head of Atho. In a newspaper interview with the Eastern Evening News he identified Swaffham as the location in which this had happened, adding that the old lady had left him a deed box containing "teeth, nail parings and old parchments. The historian Ronald Hutton later commented that there was "no means of investigating this story", but added that Howard could not be considered a trustworthy source.

A month after the Eastern Daily Press report, in April 1967, the head was stolen from Howard's shop; other valuables and a cash box were left, suggesting that the thief specifically wanted the head. Police investigated, but the crime remained unsolved. In her private diary, Valiente claimed that the head had been stolen by Cardell, and that he had buried it in Charlwood. The Pagan studies scholar Ethan Doyle White has stated that "it appears that the [Atho] tradition died out around that time". Some of its teachings through the correspondence course however survived; they were adopted by the Gardnerian Wiccan high priestess Eleanor Bone, who added them into her own Book of Shadows. She then passed these teachings on to her initiates Madge Worthington and Arthur Eaglen, who established the Whitecroft line of Gardnerians.
