= Arnold Crowther =

English magician and occultist (1909–1974)

Arnold Crowther (7 October 1909 in Chatham, Kent, England, UK – 1 May 1974) was a skilled stage magician, ventriloquist, and puppeteer, and was married to Patricia Crowther. He was born as one of a pair of fraternal twins. During his career he worked in cabaret, and in 1938–1939, he entertained Princess Elizabeth and her sister, Princess Margaret Rose at Buckingham Palace, which got him invited to numerous engagements to entertain the titled gentry of England. Crowther was also a founder, member and President of the Puppet Guild, and he made more than 500 puppets in his lifetime.

== Introduction to witchcraft ==
Shortly before World War II Crowther met Gerald Gardner and his wife Donna at the Caledonian Market in London. Arnold Crowther became friends with the Gardners and Crowther frequently visited the Gardners' London flat. Crowther became very interested in Witchcraft after meeting Gardner, but was not initiated until eighteen years later. When they met, Gardner's coven was very averse to publicity, and was afraid that Crowther might use Witchcraft in his act.

== World War II ==
During World War II Crowther entertained with the Entertainments National Services Association, touring throughout Europe and entertaining service men with his "Black Magic" show. During the war years, Crowther joined the Forces Entertainment's Corps, and entertained troops all over Europe with his show "Black Magic." The "Black Magic" show also included an African Basuto choir. On 10 November 1943, while en route from Tripoli to Malta, he performed aboard a DC 3 airplane flying at 4,000 feet.

For a time during the war Crowther was stationed in Paris, France and there he first learned of what he would come to believe was an accurate representation of his past life as a Tibetan beggar monk. He and an officer went to visit palmist, "Madame Brux", who invited them to a séance. After introductions the medium, "Madame Brux", conceivably went into a trance and mayhap began to communicate with a masculine spirit. According to Crowther's testimony, the spirit claimed to have been Crowther's teacher in a previous life, and was his guide in this present one. The perceived spirit reported that Crowther had been a student in a Tibetan lamasery, and he (the spirit) mentioned the name "Younghusband" and that "he" had been killed in a battle. However, Crowther reasoned that if he had been such a monk in a past life he would not have been reincarnated as Crowther in this one. But later, at a London exhibition of Tibetan curios, Crowther discovered that there had been a Colonel Younghusband who had led a military attack against Tibet in 1904. Crowther came to believe that in his previous life as "Younghusband" he had killed a soldier in the attack before being killed himself. Also, during his wartime travels he had met Aleister Crowley who he introduced to Gardner in 1947.

Following the war Crowther returned to performing on public stage and then he met Patricia Dawson who initiated Arnold Crowther into Witchcraft, and later married him (see Patricia Crowther.)

== Spokespersons for witchcraft ==
After they were married in 1960, Arnold and Patricia Crowther lived in Sheffield and the both of them became prominent spokespersons for Witchcraft. Crowther authored in collaboration with Patricia two books, numerous magazine articles, and a radio series on Witchcraft. In addition to his collaborated works with his wife Patricia, Crowther's other publishing efforts include: Let's Put on a Show (1964), a how-to magic book that he illustrated himself; Linda and the Lollipop Man (1973), a book on road safety for children; Yorkshire Customs (1974); and Hex Certificate (late 1970s), a collection of cartoons which he drew on the themes of Witchcraft. His autobiography, Hand in Glove, was not published but made into a series by the BBC Radio and heard in Bristol, Sheffield, Medway and Leeds between 1975 and 1977.
