= Sybil Leek =

British astrologer

- Born: Sybil Fawcett; 22 February 1917; Stoke-on-Trent, England
- Died: 26 October 1982 (aged 65); Melbourne, Florida, US
- Occupations: White witch, antiques dealer, author, television personality

Sybil Leek (née Fawcett; 22 February 1917 – 26 October 1982) was an English witch, astrologer, occult author and self-proclaimed psychic. She wrote many books on occult and esoteric subjects, and was dubbed "Britain's most famous witch" by the BBC.

== Biography ==
=== Early life in England ===
Sybil Leek was born on February 22, 1917 in the village of Normacot in Stoke-on-Trent, Staffordshire, England to a comfortable, middle-class family. Her father was a Shakespearean actor turned civil engineer, who was much older than her mother. She claimed to have been descended in "longest lineage in witch history" which included the historical Molly Leigh, who had been accused during the witch hunts, and that her family had been involved in witchcraft since 1134. According to J. Gordon Melton and Issota Poggi, Leek's claims to have been part of a coven dating to the Middle Ages are "to say the least unsupported." Leek learnt about witchcraft, astrology, Yoga, eastern philosophies, occultism, and the Jewish Kabbalah mysticism from a young age. Her family was friends with other people interested in the occult, such as author H. G. Wells and Aleister Crowley. Crowley in particular inspired Leek to write poetry, and according to Leek, said that she was "the one who will take up where I leave off" and that she would live to see occultism "almost being understood."

She attended school for only three years. A few months after her sixteenth birthday, she married her music teacher, who was twenty-four years older than she was. Two years later he died, whereupon Leek returned to live with her grandmother, quitting the Witchcraft research association. She later stayed with an acquaintance in Lyndhurst, in the New Forest, and claimed to have spent some of the following years living amongst the New Forest gypsies. When she was 20, Sybil returned to her family, who had now moved to the edge of the New Forest. She opened three antique shops; one in Ringwood, one in Somerset, and one in the New Forest village of Burley. She soon moved to Burley herself, into a house behind the shop Lawfords of Burley.

Her eccentric habits as a self-described witch soon resulted in problems. Media interest grew, and Sybil became tired of the attention from news reporters and tourists. Chris Packham, in a BBC article about her, quoted a contemporary saying, "people either thought she was a bit of a joke or a fraud." Although the village itself benefited from the extra tourism and visitors, some were unhappy with the extra traffic and noise. Her landlord eventually refused to renew her lease, prompting Leek to move away from the area and emigrate to the United States of America.

=== United States ===
When Leek moved to America, she became an astrologer, describing astrology as her "first love". In April 1964, an American publishing house wanted Sybil to speak about her new book A Shop in the High Street, and she was invited to appear on To Tell the Truth, a TV programme in the United States; her appearance occurred on 13 April 1964. She took the opportunity to go, and flew to New York City, where she gave many interviews. While in New York, she was contacted by Hans Holzer, a parapsychologist, who invited her to join him investigating hauntings and psychic phenomena. They went on to do numerous TV and radio programmes on the subject. She would later move to Los Angeles, where she met Israel Regardie, an authority on Kabbalah and ritual magic.

Leek stayed with Yoga teacher and astrologist Marcia Moore while in New England, and they dedicated a circle for use for a new coven of witches in Massachusetts. She was proud to have lectured in the same hall Helena Blavatsky addressed the Theosophical Society of St. Louis.

According to Cassell's Dictionary of Witchcraft, Leek made a good living through her television appearances.

She wrote over 60 books, including her autobiography Diary of a Witch in 1968, as well as other topics such as numerology, phrenology, astrology, and the assassinations of John F. Kennedy, Robert F. Kennedy, and Martin Luther King Jr.

Leek became "possibly the most well-known Witch in North America" during the 1970s, and founded at least four covens.

== Beliefs ==
Sybil Leek was strong in the defence of her beliefs, and sometimes differed with, and even quarrelled with, other witches. She disapproved of nudity in rituals, which is a requirement in Gardnerian Wicca, and she was strongly against the use of drugs, and she contrasted with most other witches in that she did believe in cursing. She also claimed to have had an out-of-body experience.

However, in 1968 she said she had "no feelings one way or the other about running around naked. People probably clutter themselves up with too many clothes anyway".

Leek also believed in reincarnation.

== Death ==
She died of cancer on October 26, 1982 at the Holmes Regional Medical Center in Melbourne, Florida, close to where she was living in Indialantic.

== Selected works ==
=== Books ===
Title	Year	Publisher	Identifier
A Shop in the High Street	1962 (UK) 1964 (US)	Jarrolds (UK edition) David McKay Company (US edition)	
Diary of a Witch	1968	Prentice Hall	LCCN 68--18514
The Sybil Leek Book of Fortune Telling	1969	The Macmillan Company	
Numerology: The Magic of Numbers	1969	Macmillan	
Phrenology: The Key to Limitless Understanding of Character and Personality as Revealed by the Configurations of the Regions of the Head	1970	Collier Books	
How To Be Your Own Astrologer	1970	Cowles Book Company	
The Sybil Leek's Astrological Guide to Successful Everyday Living	1970	Prentice Hall	ISBN 0-13-879882-6
Telepathy, The 'Respectable Phenomenon'	1971	The Macmillan Company - Book Club edition	
The Complete Art of Witchcraft	1971	a Signet Book New American Library	LCCN 70--15997
The Astrological Guide to Financial Success	1972	Grosset & Dunlap	
My Life in Astrology	1972	Prentice Hall Book club edition	
The Story of Faith Healing	1973	Macmillan Publishing Company	
Sybil Leek's Book of Herbs	1973	Cornerstone Library, Simon & Schuster	ISBN 0-346-12435-2
Tomorrow's Headlines Today	1974	Prentice-Hall, Inc.	
Reincarnation: the Second Chance	1974	Stein and Day	ISBN 0-8128-1693-5
Sybil Leek's Book of Curses	1975	Prentice-Hall, Inc. Book Club Edition	
Star Speak, Your Body Language from the Stars	1975	Arbor House	ISBN 0-87795-118-7
Sybil Leek's Book of the Curious and Occult	1976	Ballantine Nonfiction	ISBN 0-345-25385-X
Dreams	1976	W. H. Allen	
Sybil Leek on Exorcism. Driving Out The Devils	1976	W. H. Allen	
Astrology And Love. Be a Better Lover	1977	Berkley Publishing Corp.	
Moon Signs: Lunar Astrology	1977	W. H. Allen	ISBN 0-491-02451-7

=== Magazines ===
Title	Year	Publisher
"Sybil Leek's Astrology Vol 5 #3"	March 1972	Twin World Publications
"Sybil Leek's Astrology Vol 5 #4"	April 1972	Twin World Publications
"Sybil Leek's Astrology Vol 5 #5"	May 1972	Twin World Publications
"Sybil Leek's Astrology Vol 5 #6"	June 1972	Twin World Publications
"Sybil Leek's Astrology Vol 6 #2"	August 1972	Twin World Publications
"Sybil Leek's Astrology Vol 6 #3"	September 1972	Twin World Publications
"Sybil Leek's Astrology Vol 6 #5"	November 1972	Twin World Publications
"Sybil Leek's Astrology Vol 6 #6"	December 1972	Twin World Publications
"Sybil Leek's Astrology Vol 7 #2"	February 1973	Twin World Publications
