= Charles Cardell =

English Wiccan

- Born: 1895; East Sussex, England
- Died: 1977 (aged 85)
- Occupation: Wiccan Priest

Charles Cardell (1895–1977) was an English Wiccan who propagated his own tradition of witchcraft, the Old Tradition, which was distinct from that of Gerald Gardner. Cardell's tradition of Wicca venerated a form of the Horned God known as Atho and worked with a coven that met on the grounds of his estate in Surrey. His tradition of Wicca was continued through Raymond Howard's Coven of Atho. Indeed it was Cardell who coined the term "Wicca", and referred to its followers as "Wiccens".Charles Cardell's life and practices is extensively explored in Here Be Magick: The People and Practices of the Coven of Atho by Melissa Seims.

== Biography ==
=== Early life ===
Cardell was born in 1895, in East Sussex, as Charles Maynard. He went on to join the British army, serving in India where he claimed to have become a major though extant independent evidence of this has to date, not been found. After this, he went on to become a stage conjurer (using the stage name Cardi) and also a professional psychologist, dealing especially with people's bad experiences with the occult, during the 1950s and 1960s.

=== Witchcraft ===
When he changed his name to Cardell, he was joined by a woman known as Mary Edwards, and the two from then on claimed to be siblings. They lived together on a large estate with two properties on it (Dumbledene and Dumblecott), in Charlwood, Surrey, from where they ran Dumblecott Magick Productions, which sold various potions and charms.

==== Encounters with other Witches ====
Cardell was initially friendly with Gerald Gardner and his Bricket Wood coven. Cardell fell out with Gardner in 1958, citing Gardner's excessive publicity-seeking as the reason. Shortly after Gardner's death in 1964, Cardell published a pamphlet under the pseudonym of Rex Nemorensis, entitled "Witch", in which he insulted both Gardner and Doreen Valiente, and included sections from the Gardnerian Book of Shadows, which he may have been given by Gardner when the two had been friendly or may have come to him through a woman he had introduced into Gardner's circle named Olwen Greene.

In 1958 he published an article entitled "The Craft of the Wiccens" in Light magazine, in which he advertised for all genuine practitioners of the religion to get in touch. One such person to respond was Doreen Valiente, and she got in touch with the Cardell couple. They claimed that their mother had been a witch and that she had left them her athame and her witches' bracelet. Valiente believed that the bracelet was similar to those used in Gardnerian Wicca, and she informed Dafo that "they are not the same as ours, but bear sufficient resemblance to be worthy of our attention". Valiente later met them in his London consulting rooms, and she said that:

They were quite splendidly appointed as a sort of private temple; but when Cardell showed me a bronze tripod which was obviously 19th century and tried to tell me that it had been dug up from the ruins of Pompeii, I became rather unhappy. When he showed me a bronze statue of Thor and tried to tell me that it was of a Celtic horned god. I couldn't help myself pointing out that Thor was not a Celtic god - and then he became rather unhappy.

==== Cardell's Coven ====
In the early 1960s, the Cardells fell out with a friend of theirs, Raymond Howard, who went on to propagate the Coven of Atho. Howard later took Cardell to court, claiming that he had sent him an effigy, pierced by a needle and a mirror. Cardell won.

In the writings of Cardell and Howard, the god was referred to as Atho (by Howard) or Athor (by Cardell). Howard had a wooden statue of Atho's head which he claimed was 2200 years old, but the statue was stolen in April 1967. Howard's son later admitted that his father had carved the statue himself.

In March 1961, a musing article entitled "Witchcraft in the Woods" by William Hall was published in the London Evening News. In it, Hall claimed to have witnessed a ritual by twelve witches in the woods, involving Mary Cardell, playing the part of a Witch Maiden and dressed in a red cloak, sitting in a five-pronged tree with Charles Cardell, dressed in a black cloak adorned with a pentagram, casting a circle with a sword, blowing a horn and shooting a longbow. A shrunken head was one of the items on the altar. Shortly after, William Hall received a package containing a wooden fish with its tail broken off, accompanied by a note that said: "to William Hall, almost a reporter".

The Cardells brought about a libel case to seek to obtain a retraction and apology from the newspaper but did allow other newspaper journalists to come along and view the scene of the ritual. Only one took up his offer, the County Post reporter W. J. Locke. Locke photographed the scene, which comprised a circle in sand, a stone altar with two fake spiders on either side, a shrunken head along with the name 'Ramoh' (the craft name of Raymond Howard), a bone, a bowl of water and a crystal ball.

In 1967 the libel case against the London Evening News came to a head in court. Doreen Valiente attended the hearing, interested as to what the results would be. The Cardells claimed that their company, Dumblecott Magick Productions, was merely a front to get witches interested in them, so that they could study and expose the witch religion of Gerald Gardner, and that the ritual which they performed and was witnessed by Hall was merely a part of their front. The Cardells' actions were not believed to have been paranormal nor was their excuse acceptable by the High Court judge and they lost the court case.

In 1968, Cardell was found guilty of spreading defamatory remarks about the solicitor's company which had supported the London Evening News. The court proceedings had left the Cardells bankrupt, and they were forced to sell some of their land and live in caravans in one of their fields, though this was also something they chose to do before their loss. Charles died in 1977 and was survived by Mary who subsequently died in 1984.
