= Athame =

Ceremonial blade, generally with a black handle

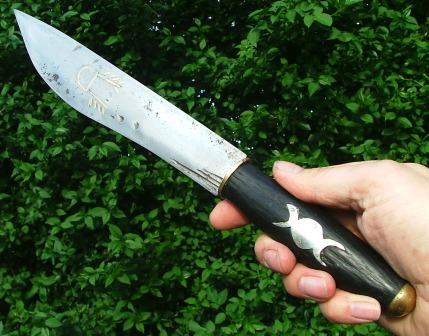
An athame, used in Wiccan ritual practices

An athame or athamé (/əˈθɑːmeɪ/ ə-THAH-may, /əˈθeɪmeɪ/ ə-THAY-may, /ˈæθəmeɪ/ ATH-əm-ay or /ˈɑːθəmeɪ/ AH-thəm-ay) is a ceremonial blade, generally with a black handle. It is the main ritual implement or magical tool among several used in ceremonial magic traditions, and by other neopagans, witchcraft, as well as satanic traditions. A knife called an arthame appears in certain versions of the Key of Solomon, a grimoire dating to the Renaissance.

The athame stands as one of the four elemental tools in modern occultism, traditionally representing fire for witches, and air for ceremonial magicians. It is mentioned in the writings of Gerald Gardner in the 1950s, who claimed to have been initiated into a surviving tradition of witchcraft, the New Forest Coven. The athame was their most important ritual tool, with many uses, but was not to be used for actual physical cutting. The other three elemental tools are the wand, the pentacle (the element of earth), and the cup or chalice (the element of water). These four magical tools correspond to four significant "weapons" or talismans in Celtic myth: The sword, the spear, the shield, and the cauldron (and/or 'grail').

These same four ritual tools also appear in the magical practices of the western hermetic tradition, derived from Golden Dawn, who pioneered the modern occult tradition and New Age spirituality; and they appear in tarot decks as the four card suits: swords, cups, wands, and pentacles. The athame is an elemental tool, while the sword is often a tool representing power, used to keep spirits in check during goetic evocation. Wiccans sometimes use the sword as a substitute for the athame.

== Appearance ==
An athame can take many forms. Contrary to popular belief, athames are not required to have double-edged blades or specially-coloured handles. Contemporary magical practitioners often choose a double-edged blade since this carries symbolic meaning.

Some witches will choose a single edge athame and use the straight edge to ring the bell for rituals. The handle of the athame is usually black, and is required in most covens which practice some variant of British tradition Wicca, including Gardnerian and Alexandrian. The handle may be inscribed with particular symbols dictated by the tradition. (Note: Farrar, Janet; Farrar, Stewart (1984). The Witches' Way. Custer, WA: Phoenix. p. 253. ISBN 0-919345-92-1; republished as part 2 of A Witches' Bible, 1996.) Janet and Stewart Farrar in A Witches' Bible suggest that the point of an athame be dulled so as to prevent un-intended physical harm during ritual use. (Note: Farrar, Janet; Farrar, Stewart (1996). A Witches' Bible: The complete witches' handbook. Custer, WA: Phoenix. ISBN 0-919345-92-1; composed of two parts: Part 1, Eight Sabbats for Witches; part 2, The Witches' Way. Part 2 orig. publ. Farrar & Farrar (1984).)

In eclectic forms of Witchcraft the handle decorations range from astrological glyphs to runes, the symbols being chosen by the owner. Many fantasy-themed athames are also available from medieval and neopagan supply shops.

Ceremonial witches, on the other hand, use the symbolic colours purple and yellow, representing the alchemical element of air, to colour the athame, and it is then inscribed with specific sigils. This is to invoke the powers it corresponds to, and make a proper impression upon the subconscious.

== Use ==
The athame's primary use is to channel and direct psychic energy, generally conceived as etheric fire. They are usually not supposed to harm or draw blood. Some modern day magical practitioners believe that if things such as herbs or cords need to be cut, another knife called a "boline" is used. The boline is often confused or mislabeled the "white-handled knife", a completely different magical blade. In fact, a boline was more similar to a sickle than a knife and thus would have made chopping herbs very difficult (the boline was, however, handy for harvesting herbs). In the "kitchen witchcraft" tradition, witches are encouraged to use magical tools for mundane purposes to increase the witch's familiarity with them.

The ritual drawing of the boundary of the magic circle – also known as "casting the circle" – is usually done with either a ritual sword or an athame, in traditional coven practice. For open rituals in public places, this is sometimes done with a ritual wand or staff instead, since there may be legal complications involved with swords and daggers in public places, even when the edges have been dulled. In most traditional covens, the athame is associated with the magical element of fire, so the circle is considered to be cast in etheric fire. This fire is traditionally envisioned as blue, indigo or violet; although it may equally well be envisioned as other colors. When the circle is ritually purified after being cast, that is traditionally done with the remaining three elements—air (incense), water (salt-water), and earth (salt) – because the element of fire has already been imbued into the circle during the casting, by the use of the athame.

After the casting, the athame is the tool traditionally used to invoke the elemental guardians of the four directions (also termed "calling the quarters"), typically by drawing invoking pentagrams at each quarter.

As a masculine principle, the black-handled athame is often used in combination with the chalice, as feminine principle, evoking the act of procreation, as a symbol of universal creativity. The athame represents the magical element of fire, associated with the Sun and the Horned God; while the chalice represents the magical element of water, associated with the Moon and the Goddess. The union of the two then represents the union of God and Goddess, male and female, sun and moon, fire and water. The marriage of the Sun and Moon—the union of opposites—is an ancient idea in alchemy; and the hieros gamos or sacred marriage of god and goddess is an even more ancient idea in pagan religions. (For example, in ancient Greece—from whence the term "hieros gamos" comes.) This rite is done by dipping the athame into the chalice to bless the wine. This is a symbol of the Great Rite in Wiccan rituals. Some modern witchcraft traditions may prefer not to use iron blades, instead preferring alternatives such as copper, bronze, or stone such as obsidian. This is most common amongst traditions that have a particular fondness of the Sidhe, to whom iron is supposedly baneful.

== Associations ==
Some Wiccan traditions associate the black-handled athame with the masculine principle and with the element of fire, as did Gardner; while the wand is associated with air. Other traditions may reverse these elemental associations, and use the athame to represent air and the wand to represent fire. Farrar & Farrar (1984, 1996) suggested this difference is due to the Golden Dawn releasing false information in the hopes of preventing its rituals being used in the correct way. They add that a witch should always choose the association which seems the most correct to them.

Fire and water are considered to be polar opposite elements, classically and in alchemy and traditional magical practice. They are sometimes considered to be the two primordial elements, the combination of which gave rise to the other two elements of earth and air. Fire and water are also the elements most associated with Sun and Moon, and thus the Horned God and the Goddess within Wicca. For this reason, covens that associate the athame with air (and the wand with fire) may decide to use the wand to bless the wine chalice, instead of using the athame. A union of air and water does not carry the same symbolic significance of the conjunctio oppositorum (union of opposites) that the union of fire and water does. Also, covens that regard the athame as air and the wand as fire, may choose to cast the ritual circle with the wand or staff, instead of the sword or athame – if they conceive of this casting in the traditional way, as a casting of etheric fire via a projection of psychic energy. If they conceive of the circle casting as cutting a line in the air with the tool of air, then they may choose to purify the circle with the remaining three elements of fire, water, and earth; this would involve using a candle to purify the circle, and omitting the incense, since the circle has already been imbued with the element of air.

The athame is the most important ritual tool in Wicca, and like other ritual tools it is generally purified and consecrated to the gods before being used for ritual and magical purposes. There are various ways of accomplishing ritual purification and consecration, depending on the specific tradition of Wicca being followed, and also whether the individual Wiccan is practicing with a coven or as a solitary witch. One common way to do this is by using the four magical elements of fire (candle), air (incense), water, and salt; and perhaps anointing the blade with an oil infused with magical herbs. Touching another person's athame without permission is considered a ritual faux pas in almost all traditions of Wicca: It is an intrusion of the owner's personal space; and more importantly, it is an act that violates the magical bond between the athame and its owner. Some witches will go to great lengths to ritually purify, reconsecrate, and rededicate an athame after it has been touched by another person.

== Acquisition ==
There are rituals of consecration for a newly acquired athame, be it new from its maker, or acquired after ritually used by some other person.

== Etymology ==
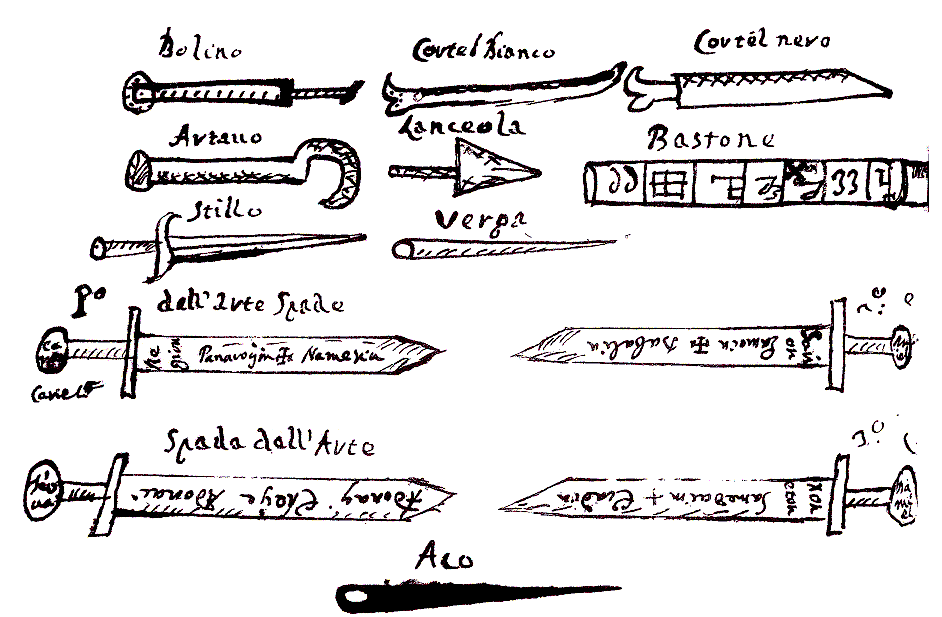
Extract from a 17th century version of the Key of Solomon. Note the bolino (boline) top left, artavo (athame) below it.

The term athame derives, via a series of corruptions, from the late Latin artavus ("quill knife"), which is well attested in the oldest manuscripts of the Key of Solomon. It means "a small knife used for sharpening the pens of scribes" ("Cultellus acuendis calamis scriptorii"). Artavus is well-attested in medieval Latin, although it is not a common word. This explains why it was left untranslated in some French and Italian manuscripts, and ultimately became garbled in various manuscripts as artavo, artavus, arthana, artanus, arthany, or arthame. Latham described the etymology of artavus as being dubious, but Johannes Balbus de Janua derives it from arto, artas, etc. ("to narrow").

An alternate etymology is given by de Garlande, (c. 1225):

Artavus dicitur Gallice ‘kenivet’, scilicet cultellus qui tendit in altum; vel dicitur ab arte, quia eo artifices utuntur.

"Artavus, called kenivet in French, namely a small knife which stretches in length, is named after ars (art or craft), because it is used by artisans."

(As distinguished either from a weapon, or from a table knife cultellos ad mensam, mensaculos.)

Idries Shah, who was personal secretary and close friend of Gerald Gardner, provides yet another etymology from an alleged Arabic al-dhammé ("blood-letter"), which was supposed to be the ritual knife of a medieval magical cult of Morocco and Andalusia. This etymology is controversial, however: It appears in his book The Sufis as a quotation from A History of Secret Societies by Daraul – a probable pseudonym of Shah. Graves (an acquaintance of Shah) suggests an Arabic derivation from al thame (or adh-dhame), which he translates as "the arrow".

A Latin manuscript version of the Key of Solomon has a drawing that looks like a sickle, labeled artavo. Gerald Gardner's use of 'athame' probably came from modern French versions of the Key of Solomon, probably via de Givry (1931), who misinterpreted the term as applying to the main ritual knife, as shown by his index entries arthane, arthame, and athane. (Note: Grillot de Givry, É.-J. (1929). Musée des sorciers, mages, et alchimistes [Museum of Sorcerers, Mages, and Alchemists] (in French) (1st ed.). Compiègne, FR: Librairie de France. English trans.: Grillot de Givry, É.-J. (1973). Illustrated Anthology of Sorcery, Magic and Alchemy. Translated by Locke, J. Courtenay. New York, NY: Causeway Books. ISBN 0-88356-018-6. See also de Givry (1931).)

== Historical parallels ==
- The Javanese kris is a ritual knife regarded as having magical powers, and Gerald Gardner was a recognized authority on these knives before he was involved in Wicca. There has been speculation that Gardner's interest and expertise in antique swords and knives, and in particular the kris knives of Malaysia and Indonesia, may have contributed to the tool's central importance in modern Wicca.
- The Roman secespita was a ritual knife used for killing a sacrificial animal.
- Zoroastrian priests (magi) traditionally used a knife (kaplo), a spear (or stick with a nail on the end), or even the forefinger, to draw ritual furrows (karsha) for purpose of delineating the protected sacred ritual space from evil and ritual pollution.
- The Tibetan three-sided ceremonial knife, the phurba, also known as the magical dagger, or kīla.
