= List of converts to paganism =

The following notable people converted to paganism from a different religion or no religion. This article addresses only past voluntary professions of faith by the individuals listed, and is not intended to address ethnic, cultural, or other considerations. Certain people listed here may be lapsed or former converts, or their current religious identity may be ambiguous, uncertain or disputed. Such cases are noted in their list entries.

== List of notable converts to paganism ==
=== From atheism or agnosticism ===
==== Agnostic ====
- Dylan Sprouse

=== From Christianity ===
- Julian the Apostate

==== Eastern/Oriential Orthodoxy ====
- Gemistus Pletho
- Gleb Botkin (From Russian Orthodoxy)

==== Protestantism ====
- Janet Farrar (From Anglicanism)
- Adefunmi (From Baptist)
- Gustav Frenssen
- Morning Glory Zell-Ravenheart
- Mary Ellen Tracy (From Mormonism/Latter Day Saints)
- Yang Chuan-kwang

==== Roman Catholicism ====
- Dan Halloran
- Maxine Sanders
- Robert Anton Wilson
- Isaac Bonewits

==== Nontrinitarian/Restoration ====
- Mary Ellen Tracy (From Mormonism/Latter Day Saints)

==== New Christian Movements ====
- Stewart Farrar (From Christian Science)

=== From Judaism ===
- Margot Adler
- Tiberius Julius Alexander

=== From Samaritanism ===
- Marinus of Neapolis

== See also ==
- List of people by belief
- List of Catholic converts
- List of converts to Hinduism
- List of converts to Islam
- List of converts to Buddhism
- List of converts to Judaism
- List of converts to Sikhism
- List of former Christians
- List of former Muslims
