= What Witches Do =

1971 book by Stewart Farrar

- first edition cover
- Author: Stewart Farrar
- Language: English
- Subject: Witchcraft
- Publisher: Coward, McCann and Geoghegan
- Publication date: 1971
- Publication place: U.S.
- Pages: 223

What Witches Do is a book by Stewart Farrar, and is an eye-witness account of Wiccan practices, namely that of the Alexandrian coven run by Alex Sanders and his wife Maxine Sanders.

== Description ==
Farrar was a practicing witch and a member of an active coven. In this book, he explores his version of the fundamental beliefs and premises of Witchcraft and explains his interpretation of its symbolism. The ceremonies presented are primarily from Alexandrian Wicca, as practiced by the author and his wife, Janet Farrar.

Much of the book concerns itself with quoting participants in Wiccan rites, with some academic description for the uninitiated. At the time of the book's writing, the author was studying Witchcraft with Maxine and Alex Sanders, with whom Farrar collaborated on the book.

== Publication data ==
- Farrar, Stewart (1971). What Witches Do: A Modern Coven Revealed. New York: Coward McCann, Inc. Revised edition (1983). Blaine, Washington: Phoenix Publishing. ISBN 0-919345-17-4
