= Magical tools in Wicca =

Tools used in the practice of magic in the religion of Wicca

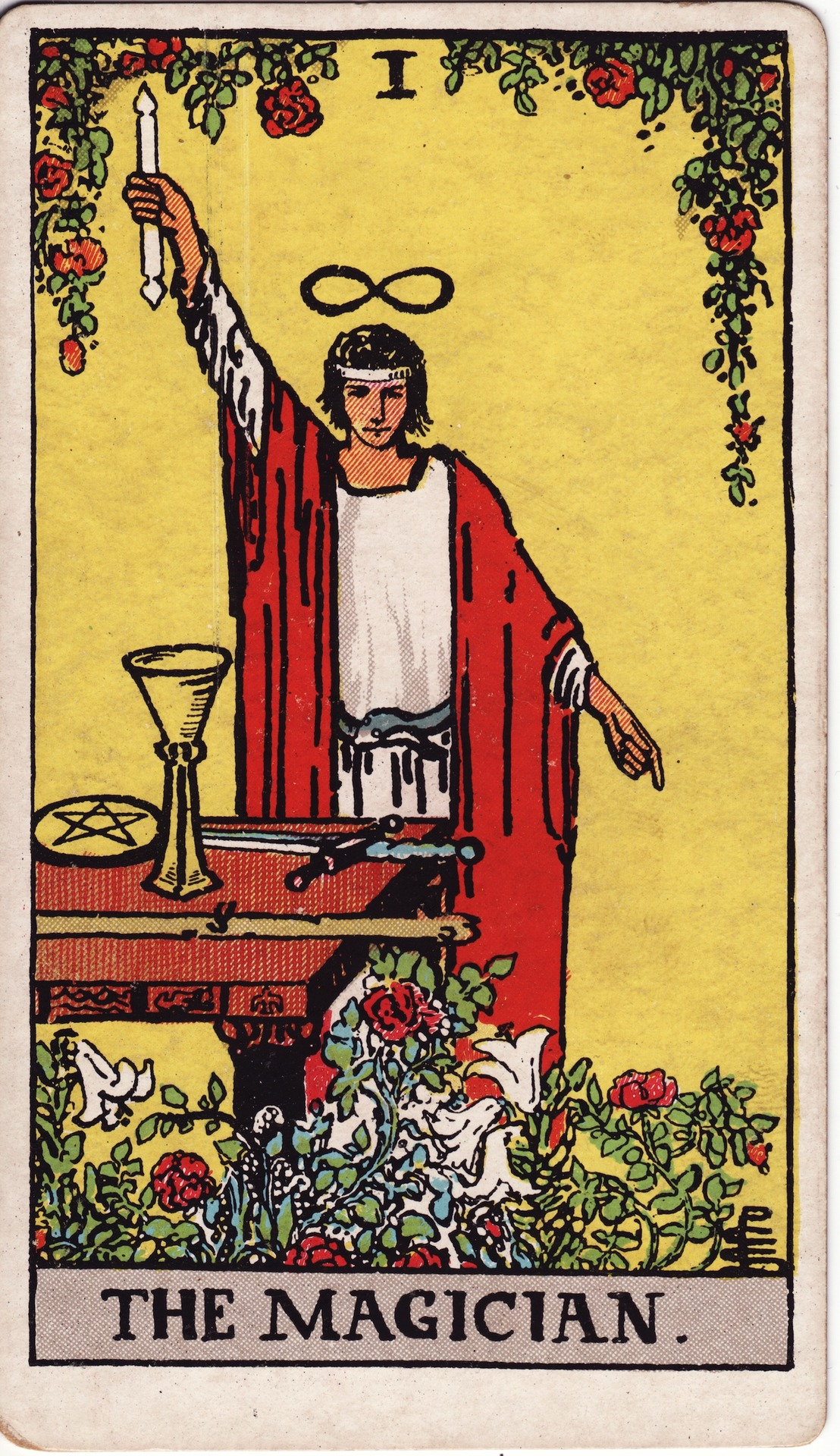
The Magician from the Rider–Waite tarot, who is depicted using the same tools that modern Wiccans use.

In the neopagan religion of Wicca a range of magical tools are used in ritual practice. Each of these tools has different uses and associations and are commonly used at an altar, inside a magic circle.

In the traditional system of Gardnerian magic, there was as an established idea of covens which were groups composed of initiated members that conducted rituals involving magical tools and secret books (Book of Shadows). These tools were predominately kept within a specific coven because they were considered sacred. These items were owned and used by individual Wiccans, but could also be used collectively by the coven.

This practice may derive partly from Masonic traditions (such as the use of the Square and Compasses), from which Wicca draws some material, and partly from the rituals of the Hermetic Order of the Golden Dawn. The latter made much use of material from medieval grimoires such as the Key of Solomon, which has many illustrations of magical tools and instructions for their preparation.

== Usage ==
In Wicca, magical tools are used during rituals which both honour the deities and work magic. The general idea is that the tool directs psychic energies to perform a certain action.

In modern-day Wicca, there is an encouragement of solitary practice of rituals and study. Covens are still a part of Wicca and related doctrines but there is now insistence that solitary practice is permissible. The allowance of solitary practice is clearly an important factor in terms of the growth of adherents, as the requirement to join a coven would involve transaction costs of locating fellow members and/or being initiated.

In Gardnerian Wicca as laid down by Gerald Gardner, someone who had been initiated in the first degree had to create (or, alternately purchase and then engrave) their own ritual tools. One of the requirements for being initiated into the second degree is that adherents had to name all of the ritual tools and explain what their purpose and associations were.

=== Consecrating tools ===
Before tools are used in ritual they first are consecrated. In the Gardnerian Book of Shadows, there is a section based entirely on consecrating ritual items. The Book of Shadows states items must be consecrated within a magic circle, at the centre of which lies a pentacle (or paten). Each item that is to be consecrated is placed upon the pentacle, sprinkled with salt and water and then passed through some incense. This is followed by the declaration,

Aradia and Cernunnos, deign to bless and to consecrate this [tool], that it may obtain necessary virtue through thee for all acts of love and beauty. Aradia and Cernunnos, bless this instrument prepared in thine honour.

== Principal tools ==
Various different tools are used in Wiccan ritual. Chief amongst them in importance are the pentacle (or paten), Athame (or sword), wand, and chalice, each of which represents one of the four elements of earth, air, fire and water.

=== Pentacle, or paten ===
The Pentacle, or paten, is a disc-shaped altar consecration tool with a sigil or magical symbol engraved or inscribed upon it. The most common symbol is a pentagram within a circle, specifically a pentacle, although some other symbols may be used such as the triquetra. The disc is symbolic of the element of earth. It is typically used during evocation as a symbol which blesses items, as well as magically energizing that which is placed upon it.

=== Sword, or knife ===
A sword or a ritual knife, commonly known as Athame, is often used in Wiccan ritual. In Gardnerian Wicca these are symbolic of the element of fire. Athame is elemental in nature while the sword is planetary in nature.

Athame is traditionally black-handled and usually inscribed (sometimes in the Theban alphabet). It is used to direct energy for the casting of magic circles, controlling of spirits and other ritual purposes. Gerald Gardner described it as "the true Witch's weapon" in the Bricket Wood Book of Shadows, something which he has been criticized for, by Frederic Lamond believing there should be no "weapons" in Wicca. In some traditions, it is never used under any circumstances to draw blood, becoming tainted and requiring destruction if it does.

The term "Athame" in its modern spelling first appears in Wicca, but it originates from words found in two historical copies of the Key of Solomon. The version currently held in the Bibliothèque de l'Arsenal, Paris, uses the term "arthame" to describe a black-handled knife. This was adopted by C.J.S. Thompson in his 1927 book The Mysteries and Secrets of Magic and by Grillot de Givry in his 1931 book Witchcraft, Magic and Alchemy. The historian Ronald Hutton theorized that Gardner got it either directly or indirectly from one of these sources, although with a modified spelling.

=== Wand ===
In Gardnerian Wicca, the wand is symbolic of the element of air, though in some traditions it instead symbolizes fire. It can be made from any material, including wood, metal and rock, and Wiccan wands are sometimes set with gemstones or crystals.

In his Book of Shadows, Gerald Gardner stated the wand is "used to summon certain spirits with whom it would not be meet to use the athame". Frederic Lamond states this referred to elemental spirits, who were traditionally believed to be scared of iron and steel.

=== Chalice, or goblet ===
The chalice, or goblet, is symbolic of the element of water. Many Wiccans do not consider it to be a tool, but instead to be a symbol of the Goddess, particularly her womb. The chalice bears many similarities with the Holy Grail, except for its symbolism used in witchcraft. Rather than being the blood of Christ, it is symbolic of the Goddess' womb. The chalice is traditionally used to hold wine.

== Other tools ==
=== Besom ===
The besom or broom, is often associated with witches and witchcraft. The stories of witches flying on brooms originated from the besom. In Wicca, it is used in handfasting ceremonies wherein a couple jumps over it. The besom is also used in seasonal fertility dances as a representation of a phallus.

=== Boline ===
The boline is a knife, traditionally with a curved blade like that of a crescent moon. It is used for harvesting and cutting herbs. A Kirfane which is a white handled knife is used for inscribing candles with symbols or sigils, or cutting ritual cords and often mistaken for the Boline. Unlike the Athame, the Kirfane is used in the physical process of magical works such as ritual cutting; the Kirfane serves for the physical plane what Athame serves for work in the spiritual/astral planes.

=== Cauldron ===
A cauldron is often associated with witches and witchcraft in western culture. In Wicca, it is sometimes used to represent the womb of the Goddess, like the chalice. It is often used for making brews (such as oils), incense-burning, and can be used to hold large, wide pillar candles depending on how small it is. A fire is often lit within the vessel and the flames are leaped over as a simple fertility rite, or at the end of a handfasting. If filled with water, a cauldron can be used for scrying. It plays a large role in Celtic magic in a similar fashion to that of Cerridwen's cauldron.

=== Censer ===
The censer is used to dispense incense.

=== Cingulum ===
In the various forms of British Traditional Wicca, cords, known as cingulum, or singulum (which literally translates as "girdle" or "belt" from Latin), are worn about the waist by adherents. These are often given to a Wiccan upon their initiation, and worn at each subsequent ritual. Traditionally they are nine feet in length (nine being three times three, the magical number), and are used to measure the circumference of the magic circle so that it can be set up correctly.

In many traditions of Wicca, the colour of a person's cingulum indicates what rank of initiate they are; in several Australian covens for instance, green denotes a novice, white denotes an initiate of the first degree, blue for the second and a plaited red, white and blue for the third, with the High Priest wearing a gold cingulum (symbolising the sun), and the High Priestess wearing silver (symbolising the moon).

Wiccan High Priest Raymond Buckland stated the cingulum should not be worn, but kept especially for spellcraft.

=== Scourge ===
The scourge is a type of religious whip. It is used in Gardnerian Wicca to flagellate members of the coven, primarily in initiation rites. Frederic Lamond said that whilst Gardner never told his Bricket Wood coven which element this was associated with, he believed that as an "instrument for exercising power over others" then it should be Fire. The scourge stands in contrast to "the Kiss" in Gardnerian and other forms of Wicca. Being representative of the "gifts of the Goddess," the scourge standing for sacrifice and suffering one is willing to endure to learn, the kiss being the blessings of abundance in all life's aspects.

=== Spear ===
In the tradition of Seax-Wica, the spear is used as a ritual tool symbolizing the god Woden, who, in Seax-Wicca tradition, is viewed as an emanation of God in place of the Horned God. According to Norse mythology, the god Odin who is the Norse equivalent to the Anglo-Saxon Woden carried the spear Gungnir. For the purpose of comparison it is notable Seax-Wica is not a part of traditional initiatory Wicca, nor is it substantially linked to the Gardnerian or Alexandrian traditions.

=== Stang ===
The stang is usually a pronged wooden staff, topped either with a naturally occurring fork or with antlers affixed. The stang was among the ritual items used by Robert Cochrane, while the term itself was likely popularized by his influence. The stang can be used for representing the Horned God, directing energy, or helping with spirit journeying.

=== Other ===
- Smudge Stick

== Ritual ==
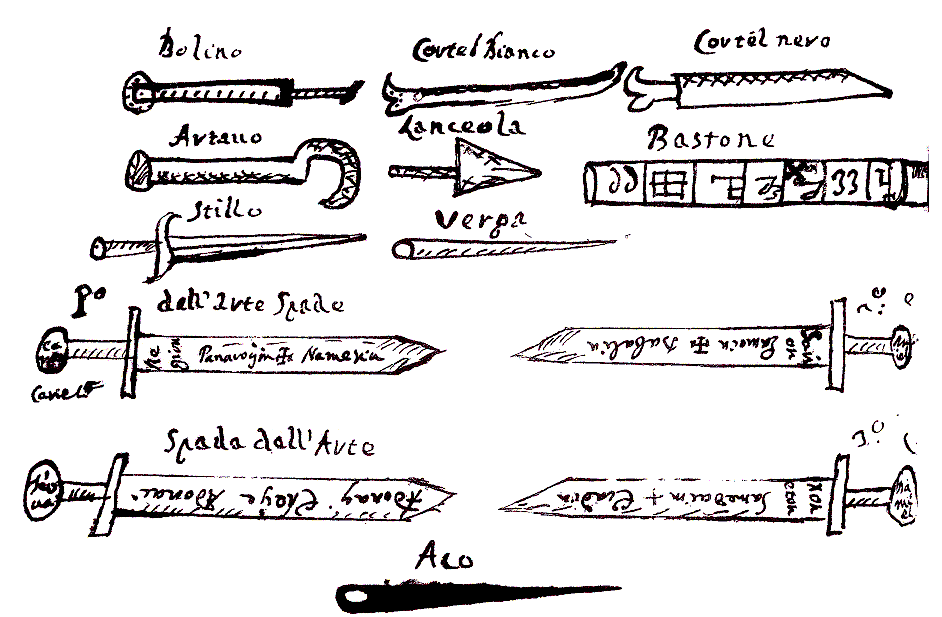
Ritual tools from the Key of Solomon.

There are elaborate rituals prescribed for the creation and consecration of magical tools. These often include the ritual passing of the tool through representations of the four elements. Some tools are ascribed correspondences to a particular element, one commonly cited correspondence being:

- Earth - Pentacle
- Fire - Wand
- Air - Sword
- Water - Chalice

These four tools may be seen in the occult tarot deck designed by Golden Dawn members A.E.Waite and Pamela Colman Smith, most obviously in the card known as The Magician. Some practitioners distinguish high magic and low magic. The former includes ceremonial magic and theurgy, and may be more commonly practiced in Alexandrian covens. The latter is more typical of the hedgewitch, who would be more likely to use everyday tools and utensils, rather than fabricating specially made magical tools.
