= Boline =

Type of ritual knife in Wicca

A boline (pron.: /ˈboʊliːn/ BOH-leen; also spelled bolline) is a white-handled ritual knife, one of several magical tools used in Wicca, mainly for the cutting of herbs and inscribing candles.

== Description ==
Unlike the athame, which in most traditions is never used for actual physical cutting, the boline is used for cutting cords and herbs, and carving candles. It has a small, straight or crescent-shaped blade with, traditionally, a white handle.

== Purpose ==
The boline has been adopted by several other modern forms of witchcraft including Eclectic Wicca. Among these later traditions opinions vary as to whether the boline is truly a magical tool or is merely of utilitarian purpose. Similarly, sometimes a white-hilted knife called a kirfane (various spellings) is used, for roughly the same purposes as the boline.

The sickle from the Key of Solomon.

According to the Kitchen Witchcraft philosophy, the use of magical tools for mundane purposes like cooking is actively encouraged, and as such there is little or no need for a boline as a separate tool from the athame. Some traditions, such as that of Robert Cochrane, also prescribe the use of a single knife for both ritual and practical purposes.

== Key of Solomon ==
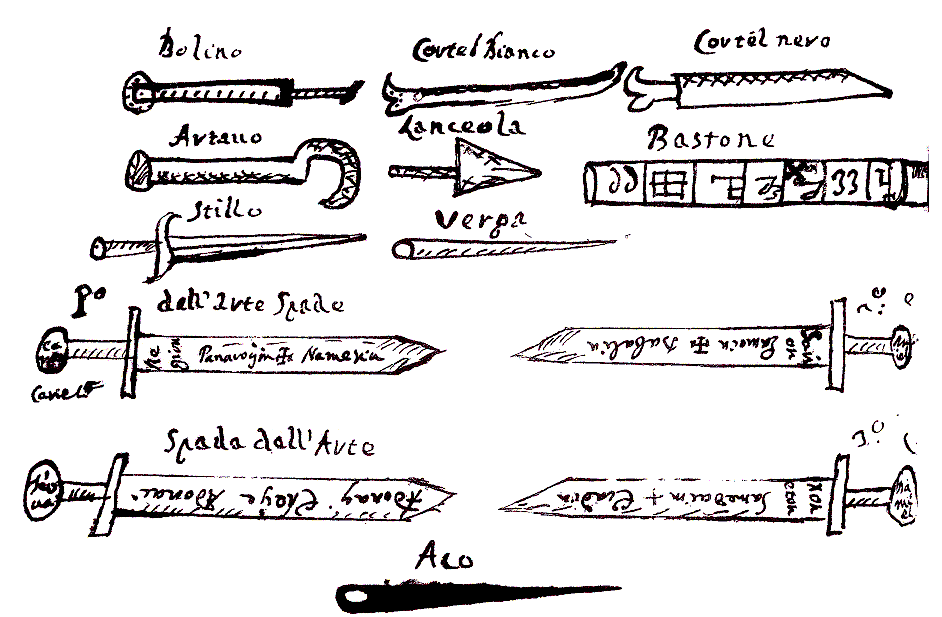
From the Key of Solomon. The artano and bolino are top left of the image.

Many of the bolines advertised in on-line "magick shops" have a characteristic crescent shape, and are described as being for harvesting herbs. This crescent shape is reminiscent of the sickle described in the Key of Solomon, a medieval grimoire and one of the sources for modern Wicca.

Confusingly, an Italian version of the Key of Solomon has a hook-shaped knife called an artauo (a possible root for athame) and a straight, needle-shaped blade called a bolino. When the name "boline" was first used to describe the crescent-shaped blade is not clear. In The Book of Ceremonial Magic published by Arthur Edward Waite in 1911, Waite references a number of early works on magic which mention the bolline or sickle, saying

"Among the necessary properties mentioned by the Book of True Black Magic are the sword, the staff, the rod, the lancet, the arctrave or hook, the bolline or sickle, the needle, the poniard, a white-handled knife and another knife, with a black handle, used to describe the circle. The most important to make is that called the bolline..."
