= Chthonioi Alexandrian Wicca =

Chthonioi Alexanderian Wicca
- Abbreviation: CAW
- Type: Syncretic Wicca
- Classification: British Traditional Wicca
- Orientation: Alexandrian Wicca · Proto-Hellenism
- Governance: Priesthood
- Structure: 'Family'
- Region: United States
- Origin: 1974; 52 years ago Boston, Massachusetts
- Coven: 12/13
- Members: Lower than 100-200

Chthonioi Alexandrian Wicca is a Boston-area family of Alexandrian Wicca-covens directly downline from Coven Chthonioi. Coven Chthonioi grew out of the Alexandrian practice of its founders in the 1970s, has an unbroken lineage back to Alex Sanders and Maxine Sanders, and has been in continuous operation since 1974. This coven is the originator of the cycle of rituals that has become known as the Book of the Provider. Chthonioi Alexandrian covens include the worship of the Gods and Goddesses of Greece (Greco-Roman Pantheon and Isian worship) as opposed to the traditional Alexandrian Wicca worship of the Gods and Goddesses of Britain in their open (and some closed) rituals.

The standard initiation practice is cross-gender initiation (female to male; male to female) but the Chthonioi Alexandrian line also accepts same-gender initiations as valid. As quoted from their statement of identity: "Some branches of the Chthonioi-Alexandrian allow Same-Sex Initiations (SSI) as a way of acknowledging the importance and validity of inner contacts and true connection to the divine regardless of physical sex. Although not universally practiced by all within our [line], we nonetheless acknowledge SSIs as equally valid, lineaged, proper Initiations and part of our Tradition."

== Controversy ==
Although the majority of Initiates in the Chthonioi Alexandrian line have undergone the traditional Initiation and consider themselves to be Alexandrian, the acceptance of Same Sex / Same Gender Initiations (SSI / SGI) in the wider Wiccan community continues to be controversial. Some more conservative Alexandrians do not accept those who have received an SSI as valid. Therefore, there are members of the Chthonioi Alexandrian line who are welcomed as Initiates within the family but not universally recognized as such outside of it. These individuals may consider themselves as belonging to a separate tradition - the Chthonioi Alexandrian Tradition.
