= Altar (Wicca) =

Place of spiritual practice

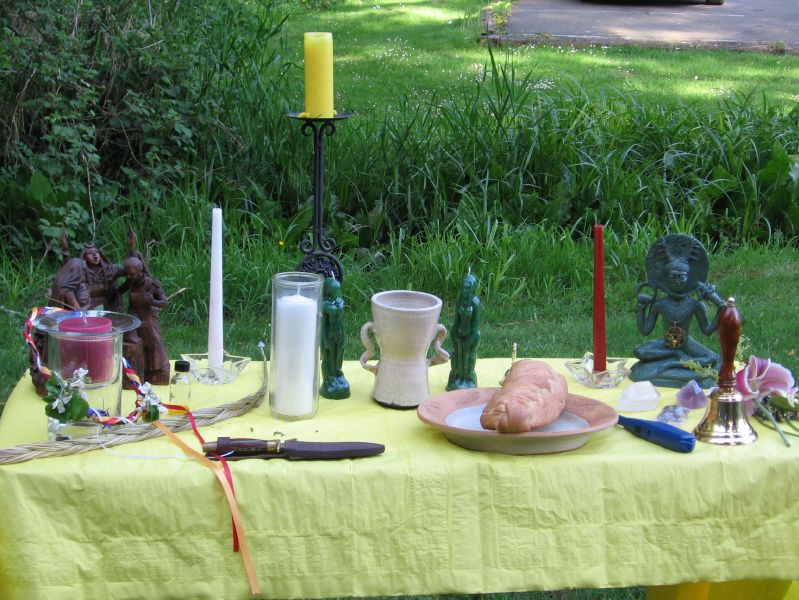
An altar with candles, chalice, and athame

A Wiccan altar is a "raised structure or place used for worship or prayer", upon which a Wicca practitioner places several symbolic and functional items for the purpose of worshiping the God and Goddess, casting spells, and/or saying chants and prayers.

== Types of altars ==
There are many types of altars Wiccans may choose to use during ritual. Depending on which rite they are performing, the material used for their altars may vary. Some say wood from an oak tree is best while others argue maple or teak are the only ones should be used. This is because in many circles, different types of wood are believed to carry certain magical qualities. For example, in one Wiccan tradition, oak symbolizes great strength and may be used to strengthen the rite they are performing. In another tradition, maple may be seen as the strongest. Whether that be a coffee table or a tree stump, it is up to the Wiccan.

== Altar items ==
The altar is often considered a personal place where practitioners put their ritual items. Some practitioners may keep various religious items upon the altar, or they may use the altar and the items during their religious workings. According to Scott Cunningham, a popular Wiccan author, the left side of the altar should be considered the Goddess area; feminine or yonic symbols such as bowls and chalices, as well as Goddess representations and statues should be placed on the left. The right side is designated for the God; phallic symbols such as the athame and the wand are placed to the right side, as well as God statuary and his candle. The left and right associations vary according to personal preference, but the center area is almost always considered the "both" area, or the working area. In the center of the altar are kept the main symbols of the Wiccan faith, such as the pentacle.

Some Wiccans arrange their altars to represent all four elements and directions. In the North the earth element is represented; in the east is air, in the south is fire, and in the west water.

== Location of altar ==
Wiccan altars may be set up outside as well as indoors. Some Wiccans dedicate an entire room to their practice while others (especially those who share a living space) use a temporary altar. A temporary altar can be any flat surface that can be moved easily such as a coffee table. More permanent altars are left up for the Wiccan to return to for their rites and rituals.

== Altar decor ==
There are eight Wiccan holidays, known as Sabbats, that celebrate the cycles and seasons of nature. These include the four seasons (Winter, Spring, Autumn & Summer), the mating habits of animals and the reaping and sowing of crops. Based on the Sabbat, the altar is decorated accordingly. For example, the Summer Solstice altar cloth should be white and the altar decorated with Summer flowers, fruits and anything else that symbolizes Summer. This goes for each Sabbat. Certain Wiccan traditions may have different colors but universally, the altar is usually decorated to represent the time of year.

== See also ==
- Broom – Type of broom
- Cauldron – Large kettle
- Shrine – Dedicated holy or sacred place
- Triple Goddess – Triunity of deities in Neopaganism
