= Mary Tracy =

Mary Tracy may refer to:

- Mary Ellen Tracy (born 1943), high priestess of the Church of the Most High Goddess
- Mary Lee Tracy, American gymnastics coach
- Mary Tracy Earle (1864– 1955), American fiction writer

== See also ==
- Mary Tracey-Purcell (born 1949), Irish middle-distance runner
