= Alexandrian Wicca =

Tradition of Wicca founded by Alex Sanders

- Abbreviation: AW
- Type: Wicca
- Classification: British Traditional Wicca
- Orientation: Gardnerian Wicca
- Governance: Priesthood
- Region: Australia, United Kingdom, Brazil, South Africa, Canada and United States
- Founder: Alex Sanders and Maxine Sanders
- Origin: 1960s United Kingdom
- Separations: Chthonioi Alexandrian Wicca (1974)
- Members: Over 1,000
- Other name: Alexandrian Witchcraft

Alexandrian Wicca or Alexandrian Witchcraft is a tradition of the Neopagan religion of Wicca, founded by Alex Sanders (also known as "King of the Witches") who, with his wife Maxine Sanders, established the tradition in the United Kingdom in the 1960s. Alexandrian Wicca is similar in many ways to Gardnerian Wicca, and receives regular mention in books on Wicca as one of the religion's most widely recognised traditions.

== Origins and history ==
The tradition is based largely upon Gardnerian Wicca, in which Sanders was trained and initiated, and also contains elements of ceremonial magic and Qabalah, which Sanders had studied independently.

Maxine Sanders recalls that the name was chosen when Stewart Farrar, a student of Alex Sanders, began to write What Witches Do. "Stewart asked what Witches who were initiated via our Covens should be called; after much discussion, he came up with 'Alexandrian' which both Alex and I rather liked. Before this time we were very happy to be called Witches". The most recent edition of What Witches Do (2010) includes previously published interviews between Sanders and Farrar.

Alexandrian Wicca is practised outside of Britain, including Canada, Ireland, Portugal, Spain, the United States, Brazil and South Africa.

== Practices ==
Alexandrian Wicca, in similarity with other traditional Wiccan practices, emphasises sexual polarity. This emphasis can be seen in the Sabbat rituals, which focus on the relationship between the Horned God and the Triple Goddess.

As compared to Gardnerian Wicca, Alexandrian Wicca is "somewhat more eclectic", according to The Encyclopedia of Modern Witchcraft and Neo-Paganism. Maxine Sanders notes that Alexandrians take the attitude "If it works use it". Tool use and deity and elemental names also differ from the Gardnerian tradition. Skyclad practice, or ritual nudity, is practiced within the tradition, training is emphasized, and ceremonial magic practices, such as those derived from Hermetic Qabalah and Enochian magic may be part of ritual. Alex's work on his Book of Shadows continued up until his death resulting, like the Gardnerian in several different versions. Some of these derived from his teaching notes that his students received in the late 1960s and early 1970s. It is not unusual to find that earlier initiates did not receive the same books as later ones although they obtained all the information in dictated form, Sander's preferred mode of teaching.

Alexandrian covens meet on new moons, full moons and during Sabbat festivals.

== Ranks and degrees ==
Alexandrian Wicca shares with other traditional Wicca systems the belief that "only a witch can make another witch". The process through which an individual is made a witch is called "initiation". As in Gardnerian Wicca, there are three levels, or "degrees", of initiation, commonly referred to as "first", "second", and "third" degree. Only a second or third degree witch can initiate another into witchcraft, and only a third degree witch can initiate another to third degree. A third degree initiate is referred to as a "High Priestess" or "High Priest". The Farrars published the rituals for the three ceremonies of initiation in Eight Sabbats for Witches.

Some Alexandrians have instituted a preliminary rank called "neophyte" or "dedicant." In these Alexandrian covens, a neophyte is not bound by the oaths taken by initiates, and thus has an opportunity to examine the tradition before committing to it. Neophytes are not, however, considered to have actually joined the tradition until they do take first degree. As such they would not experience certain aspects of rituals that were considered oathbound.

== Relationship to other traditions ==
Historian Ronald Hutton records comments from British practitioners of Gardnerian and Alexandrian Wicca that distinctions between the two traditions have blurred in the last couple of decades, and some initiates of both traditions have recognized initiation within one as qualification for the other. Author Vivianne Crowley often trains her students in both traditions. In the United States, Alexandrian priestess Mary Nesnick, an initiate of both traditions, created a deliberate fusion of the two, which she named the Algard Tradition.

Janet and Stewart Farrar, both of whom were initiated into the Alexandrian tradition by the Sanderses, describe themselves as having left the tradition after the release of Eight Sabbats for Witches. They were later referred to as "Reformed Alexandrian", a description that Janet Farrar does not use preferring just to refer to herself and her initiates as witches. Chthonioi Alexandrian Wicca and the "Starkindler Line" are derived from Alexandrian Wicca, and Alexandrian Wicca was a major influence on Blue Star Wicca and Odyssean Wicca.

The High Magical and Qabalistic strands of the Alexandrian tradition also informed the Ordine Della Luna in Constantinople which, from 1967 onwards, Sanders operated as a 'side-degree' or ancillary rite to Alexandrian Wicca, most notably in collaboration with Derek Taylor in the 1980s.

== See also ==
- Great Rite
- Neopaganism
- Alex Sanders
- Maxine Sanders
