= Pity About the Abbey =

1965 BBC television drama

Pity About the Abbey is a 1965 BBC television drama written by Stewart Farrar and John Betjeman, and directed by Ian Curteis. Pity About the Abbey is a 90-minute play written for a strand of programmes titled Londoners.

The play imagines that Westminster Abbey, one of the most significant religious sites in the United Kingdom, was demolished to make way for a by-pass. They play satirised what the two writers saw as the current trend to demolish significant or beautiful structures under the pretext of necessity, for example the Euston Arch. It was recorded for television by the BBC and broadcast on 29 July 1965, and later repeated as part of The Wednesday Play slot in 1966.

The programme still exists.
