= Gavin Bone =

British occult writer (b. 1964)

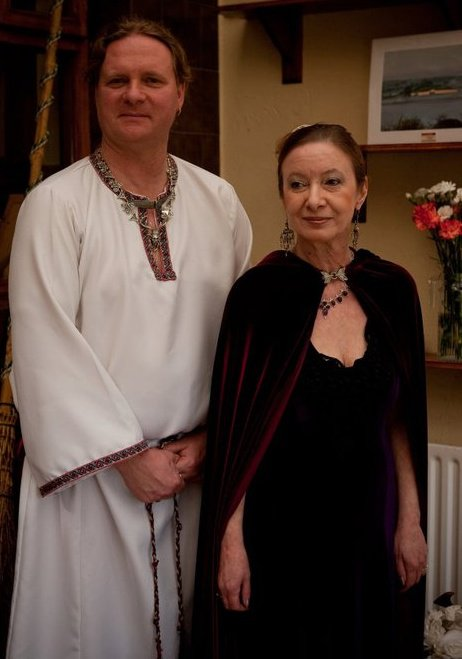
Gavin Bone (left) beside Janet Farrar

Gavin Bone (born 19 January 1964) is an English author and lecturer in the fields of magic, Neopagan witchcraft, Wicca and Neo-Paganism, and an organizer in the Neo-Pagan community. He was born in Portsmouth, Hampshire in England, in 1964.

== Early life ==
He was born on 19 January 1964 and was brought up in Portsmouth, Hampshire. His mother regularly visited mediums and tarot readers, which was a major influence in his occult interest. He attended several conferences and events in Portsmouth on the unexplained, which made him become interested in everything from UFOs to the Surrey Puma, ghosts, and the Bermuda Triangle.

== Career ==
Firstly he wanted to pursue a career in the British Army, but was unable to go into regular service and served in 219 Wessex General Hospital RAMC (V) instead. Then he left because of his political beliefs. He became involved with groups such as Greenpeace from 1981. He became interested in Wicca during the same period, having previously explored Buddhism, Hinduism and Taoism. He also started to train as a spiritual healer, after he had attended The Joseph Carey Spiritualist Centre. He practised solitary from 1982 before finding his first magical group in 1985 working from the Fifth Dimension Occult store, Eastney, Portsmouth. His group was eclectic and included earth healing practices as well as High Magic. It was from this group that the first coven he joined emerged, which was based on Buckland's Seax Wicca. He was later initiated into a Gardnerian based tradition.

== Wicca and Neopaganism ==
He has trained as a registered nurse and has studied complementary healing methods such as reflexology. He was initiated into Seax-Wica in 1986, and was involved in the revival of British/Anglo-Saxon traditional shamanism in the late 1980s through a web site called PaganLink. He is currently developing the theory that Wicca may have some roots in tribal shamanistic healing traditions, as opposed to medieval ritual magic.

Bone first met Janet Farrar and Stewart Farrar in 1989 at a Pagan camp at Groby, near Leicester, where they became friends. He accompanied them on a tour to the United States in 1992, and after their return he moved to Ireland and became their business partner. He joined the Farrars as part of a "polyfidelitous relationship", and they continued their personal and professional relationship since Stewart's death on 7 February 2000. He co-authored several books with the Farrars, and he is the production manager for their videos. He also set up their website in 1996, which has become the “Pagan Information Network”, a contact network for Pagans across the Republic and Northern Ireland, for which Bone and Janet Farrar are the primary coordinators.

Bone and Janet Farrar are currently active members in the Aquarian Tabernacle Church of Ireland, and have links with several covens in the United States, Australia, New Zealand and Europe. They ran a progressive coven in Ireland called Coven Na Callaighe until early 2009 which was part of Teampall Na Callaighe, which once included an open worship group Clan Na Callaighe.

Janet Farrar and Gavin Bone handfasted in Ireland, May 2001. They have legally been married since March 2014.

== Early Pagan Network involvement ==
Following attending Link-Up '89 (September 1989) in Groby, Leicester, Gavin became involved in Pagan Link as a contact and facilitator for Portsmouth, with his wife Tania Andrade. They regularly held moots in Portsmouth, in the Milton area, and from this a small coven naturally developed of no specific tradition. He later became a contact for the Pagan Federation as it expanded its contact network. He and his wife also became part of Clan Bran, which is a clan of eclectic practitioners. It was based in Abbots Bromley, Staffordshire, before it moved to the Republic of Ireland.

== Bibliography ==
- 1999 - The Pagan Path (Phoenix Publishing) ISBN 0-919345-40-9
- 1999 - The Healing Craft (Phoenix Publishing) ISBN 0-919345-18-2
- 2001 - The Complete Dictionary of European Gods and Goddesses (Holmes Pub Group LLC) ISBN 1-86163-122-7
- 2004 - Progressive Witchcraft (New Page Books) ISBN 1-56414-719-3
- 2016 - Lifting the Veil(Acorn Guild Press) ISBN 978-1-936863-85-3
