= Legend of the Witches =

1970 British film by Malcolm Leigh

- Theatrical release poster
- Directed by: Malcolm Leigh
- Screenplay by: Malcolm Leigh
- Produced by: O. Negus-fancey
- Starring: Guy Standeven; Alex Sanders; Maxine Sanders
- Edited by: Judith Smith
- Production company: Border Film Productions (London) Ltd.
- Release date: 1970
- Running time: 85 minutes
- Country: United Kingdom
- Language: English

Legend of the Witches is a 1970 British black-and-white drama-documentary film directed and written by Malcolm Leigh and starring Guy Standeven, Alex Sanders and Maxine Sanders.

== Plot ==
In dramatised documentary style the film covers the cult and practice of British witchcraft since pre-Christian times. Topics include: modern initiation rites, divination, Christianity's appropriation of pagan rutual, the Black Mass and Cecil Williamson's Museum of Witchcraft in Cornwall.

== Cast ==
- Guy Standeven as narrator
- Alex Sanders as himself
- Maxine Sanders as herself

== Reception ==
The Monthly Film Bulletin wrote: "Despite a good deal of rather goose-pimply nudity, this is mercifully not just another tabloid expose of the wicked ways of black magicians, but a fairly serious attempt to unravel the principles and practices of modern witchcraft. ... The film opens with great solemnity ... the relentless atmospherics then continue with endless shots of rocks, waves and swirling seaweed, so artily contrived that one sometimes wishes the director would cut the pseudo-poetics and simply get down to tabloid tacks."

Kine Weekly wrote: "The film deals with a subject that interests everyone, but presents its fascinating information with a mixture of portentous solemnity and atmospheric black-and-white photography that tends towards repetition, especially in the frequent recourse to naked devotees dancing around a log fire on a heath at dead of night. Interesting facts are mixed with angled assumptions and Christianity is introduced mainly for its dramatic value as a cruel persecutor of the worshippers of Lucifer, whose only crime is to defend themselves by sticking pins into effigies of people they dislike."

Anthony Blampied, writing in the Journal of Film Preservation, called the film "a surprisingly sober undertaking."

Sight and Sound wrote: "Legend of the Witches (1970) is far from its reputation as just another Soho skin flick... Leigh's film is a genuinely detailed documentary coupled with eerie images straight from the most polished of occult horror films, looking at times better than its fictional equivalents."

== Home media ==
The film was released on DVD in 2019 by the British Film Institute in its Flipside series, paired with Secret Rites (1971).
