= Alex Sanders (Wiccan) =

British Wiccan priest (1926–1988)

- Alex Sanders, in ritual regalia
- Born: Orrell Alexander Carter; 6 June 1926; Birkenhead, England
- Died: 30 April 1988 (aged 61); Sussex, England
- Occupation: Wiccan Priest
- Spouses: Doreen Stretton; Arline Maxine Morris; Gillian Sicka
- Children: 5

Alex Sanders (6 June 1926 – 30 April 1988), born Orrell Alexander Carter, who went under the craft name Verbius, was an English occultist and High Priest in the modern Pagan religion of Wicca, responsible for founding, and later developing with Maxine Sanders, the tradition of Alexandrian Wicca, also called Alexandrian Witchcraft, during the 1960s.

Raised in a working-class family, Alex, as a young man, began working as a medium in the local Spiritualist Churches before going on to study and practise ceremonial magic. In 1963, he was initiated into Gardnerian Wicca before founding his own coven, through which he merged many aspects of ceremonial magic into Wicca. He claimed to have been initiated by his Welsh-speaking grandmother, Mary Bibby (née Roberts), as a child, though recent research has disproven this, with Bibby dying in 1907, some 19 years before Sanders' birth.

Throughout the 1960s, he would court publicity in the press, appearing in a number of documentaries, marrying the 20 years younger Maxine Sanders, and was elected as "King of the [Alexandrian] Witches" in 1965 as he "[was] directly descended from witches, and equipped with knowledge that outstrips [his witches] [...] [we formally acknowledge you] as the foremost authority on witchcraft," something that led to other prominent Gardnerian Witches, such as Patricia Crowther and Eleanor Bone, attacking him in the press. In the late 1970s and 1980s and prior to his death, he went on to found and work with a ceremonial magical group known as the Ordine Della Luna.

Sanders died on 30 April 1988 at St. Mary's Hospital at Hastings of cancer of the bronchus with bone metastasis.

== Early life ==
Born to unmarried Hannah Jane Bibby and Orrell 'Harold' Alexander Carter, Sanders was born as Orrell Alexander Carter on 6 June 1926 at 56 Church Road, Tranmere, Birkenhead, and was the eldest of six surviving children. Sanders' father was a general labourer while his mother was a domestic servant. Later, the family, who had been living at the home of Sanders' paternal grandmother, Elizabeth Carter (née Gandy), at 1 Moon St. Birkenhead, moved to Cornbrook Street, Old Trafford, Manchester, and unofficially changed their name to Sanders. Sanders was unaware of his official surname of 'Carter' until he applied for a passport later in life, and only changed his name by deed poll in the 1960s.

== Family life ==
Around the mid 1940s, he began working for a manufacturing chemist's laboratory in Manchester. He married a co-worker, nineteen-year-old Doreen Stretton, in 1948 when he was 22, using the name Alexander O. Sanders. They had two children, Paul and Janice. Sanders wanted more children but Doreen did not; she also disapproved of the supernatural. The marriage quickly deteriorated and Doreen took the children and left Sanders when he was 26. According to Maxine Sanders, Sanders was grief-stricken and cursed Doreen with fertility; she remarried and had three sets of twins.

Whilst working in a pharmaceutical company, Sanders became friends with Maxine Sanders' (née Morris) mother, however, they lost contact for a while, probably due to the "intense dislike" that Maxine's father had for him (being convinced Alex was homosexual). Sanders and Arline M. Morris (Maxine) married in June in 1968 in Kensington.

After his divorce from Maxine, Sanders married for a third and final time to Gillian Sicka in December in 1982 in Hastings and Rother.

== Initiation into Gardnerian Witchcraft ==
Several contradictory accounts exist of Sanders' initiation into Gardnerian Witchcraft, and even his own accounts are inconsistent. One account, given in Sanders' biography, King of the Witches by June Johns, tells that Sanders, visiting his Welsh grandmother, Mary Bibby, unannounced, stumbled upon her performing a ritual. Unhappy that Sanders had not knocked to make his presence known, Bibby told Sanders to take off his clothes, and that she was going to "make sure that you don't tell another living soul what you have seen this day," adding, "if you do [...] I'll kill you."

However, this assertion that Sanders was initiated by his grandmother in any fashion has been discredited, as Wibberley (2018) states:

These documents, prepared in 2018 and recently made publicly available through the Alexandrian Witchcraft Timeline & Archive, show beyond a doubt that the story of Alex's childhood initiation at the hands of his maternal grandmother Mary Bibby (née Roberts) is not credible as an accurate historical account of events. Records show Mary passing away in 1907, when Alex's own mother would have been only four years old. The report puts it succinctly: "Mary could have had no direct influence on Alex as she did not live long enough to raise her own children so that [Sanders's claims to have had interaction with her] are demonstrably false."

— Wibberley, C.

Gardnerian High Priestess Patricia Crowther tells a different story. According to letters she claims she received from him in 1961, he did not at that time claim to be an initiate, but felt an affinity with the occult and had experienced second sight. In a 1962 interview, Sanders claimed to have been initiated for a year, working in a coven led by a woman from Nottingham. This claim is corroborated by Maxine Sanders, Sanders' future wife and High Priestess.

In his book, A Coin for the Ferryman: The Death and Life of Alex Sanders, Jimahl di Fiosa (2010) also writes, "Medea later meets Alex Sanders and makes a decision to initiate him on March 9, 1962." The exact identity of 'Medea' is still a debated topic within the Alexandrian Witchcraft and larger witchcraft community. Having said that, it is most likely that Sanders was initiated by a woman named Pat Kopinski, who then let Sanders copy her Book of Shadows. Di Fiosa (2010) notes that there are three spellings of Pat's surname: Kopinski, as used by Pat herself; Kopanski; and Kasprzynski.

Maxine also claims that all of Sanders' brothers were also psychic, saying:

It wasn't unusual to walk into the Sanders' kitchen in broad daylight to find a full materialisation séance in progress. Mrs. Sanders would be carrying on with the chores regardless of the apparitions in attendance.

— Sanders, M.

When Sanders publicly revealed himself as a witch, however, Mrs. Sanders feigned shock and threatened a nervous breakdown.

== Wicca ==
Sanders' first contact with Wicca was in the early 1960s, through correspondence and meetings with Patricia Crowther. In September 1962, he succeeded in convincing the Manchester Evening News to run a front-page article on Wicca. This publicity had several unfortunate side-effects for Sanders, including the loss of his job at the library and estrangement from the Crowthers, who considered him a troublesome upstart and refused to initiate him.

Sanders was eventually initiated by a Priestess, Pat Kopinski, who had been a member of the Crowthers' coven, and with whom Maxine Sanders later worked for several years. According to Maxine Sanders, Sanders copied his Book of Shadows from the book of his initiator, Kopinski, in the normal manner.

Eventually, coven members with whom Sanders was practising left the coven amicably, leaving Sanders to continue as the High Priest and Sylvia Tatham as the High Priestess. Di Fiosa estimates that by the end of 1963, Sanders and Tatham had initiated over 100 witches in England. During this period, Sanders' coven worked at his home at 24 Egerton Road North, Chorlton-cum-Hardy, Manchester. Sanders continued to attract media attention which brought him more followers, and by 1965, Sanders claimed to have initiated 1,623 people in 100 covens. He was then proclaimed "King of the [Alexandrian] Witches".

Sanders' alleged magical feats included creating familiars and healing warts, illnesses, and physical deformities.

Sanders apparently joined other esoteric and chivalric orders in the early part of 1968, which numbered 16 in 1974, and possibly more before his death. These included the Knights Templar, the Order of Saint Michael, and the Order of Saint George. According to Maxine Sanders, Sanders also founded a number of Orders, including Order of the Romaic Crescent and its offshoot, Ordine Della Luna.

== Left-hand path ==
After the Second World War and his separation from Doreen and his children, Sanders felt isolated by his occult knowledge, and decided to live a life of the "left-hand path", after having drifted from one low-level job to another, and having had sexual affairs with both men and women:

I made a dreadful mistake in using black magic in an attempt to bring myself money and sexual success. It worked all right – I was walking through Manchester and I was accosted by a middle-aged couple who told me that I was the exact double of their only son, who had died some years previously. They took me into their home, fed and clothed me, and treated me as one of the family. They were extremely wealthy, and in 1952, when I asked them for a house of my own, with an allowance to run it on, they were quite happy to grant my wishes. I held parties, I bought expensive clothes, I was sexually promiscuous; but it was only after a time that I realised I had a fearful debt to pay.

— Purnell

Sanders' sister, Joan, was injured in an accidental shooting and shortly after was diagnosed with terminal cancer at a very young age. Sanders blamed his sister's ill-health on himself for his involvement in the left hand path, and resolved to stop using his magic for selfish reasons and instead teach it to others.

In 1963, Sanders began to study the works of Abramelin the Mage. It was around this time, Di Fiosa (2004) notes, that Sanders believed that angels told him to seek employment as a porter, book-duster, and odd-job man in the John Rylands Library, Manchester, where he could access an original copy of the Key of Solomon. Not long thereafter, Sanders' employment was terminated for dismantling the late 19th century edition of the Mathers' translation of the Key of Solomon. As well as influence from Goetia, which Sanders incorporated into his version of Wicca, Sanders was greatly influenced by the teachings of Eliphas Levi.

== Births, relationships, and the media ==
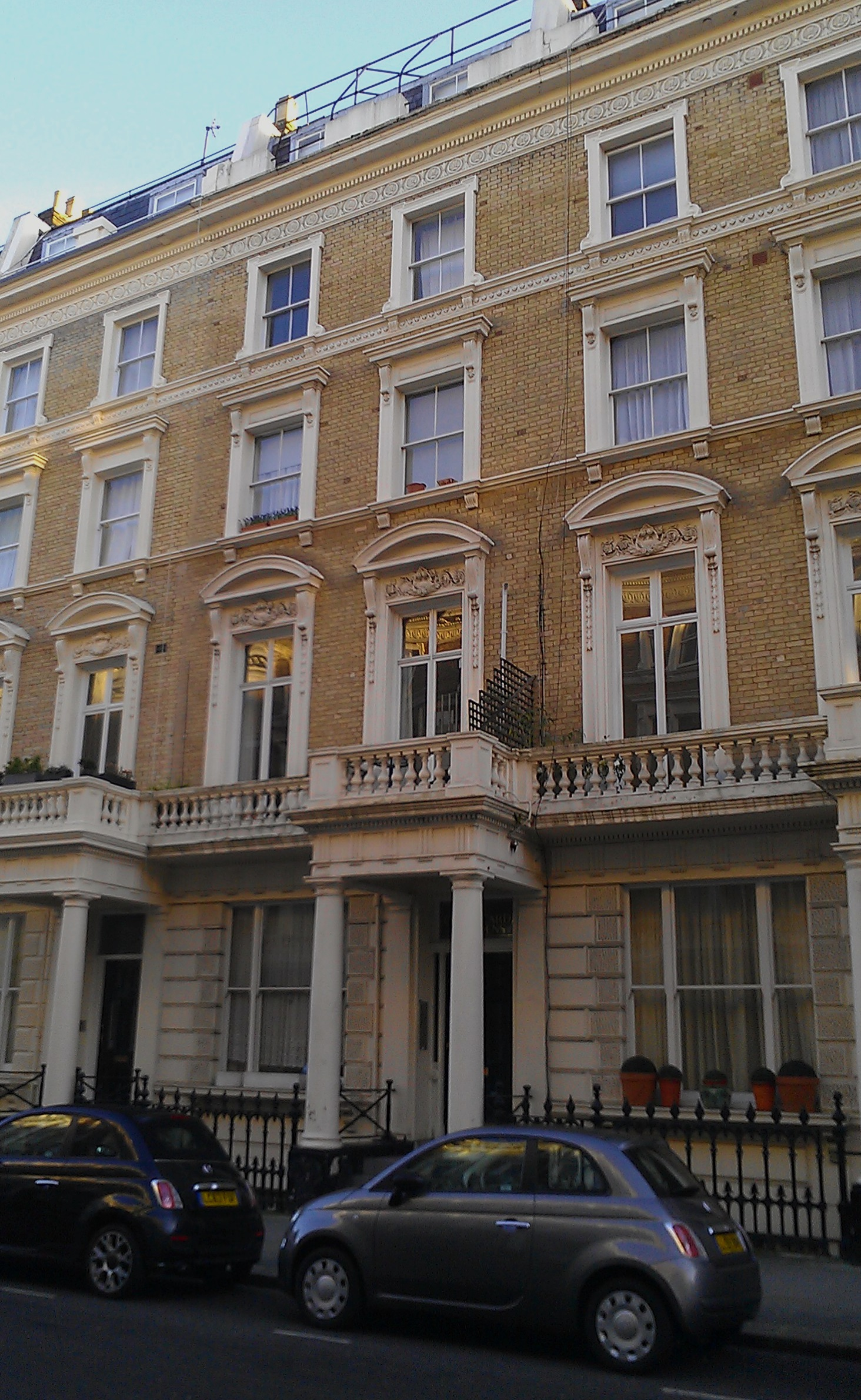
15 Clanricarde Gardens, where Alex and Maxine lived in a basement apartment

During the 1960s, Sanders met Arline Maxine Morris (Maxine Sanders). Morris was 20 years his junior and was initiated into Sanders' coven in 1964 and went on to become his High Priestess. In 1965, they handfasted, and in 1968, they married in a civil ceremony and moved into a basement flat near Notting Hill Gate in London, where they ran their coven and taught classes on Witchcraft. Earlier that year, their daughter, Maya Alexandria, was born.

According to Maxine, Sanders, as a bisexual man, also had a number of relationships with men during his relationship with Maxine.

The projection of Sanders into the national public spotlight resulted from a sensational newspaper article in 1969, which led to the romanticised biography, King of the Witches, by June Johns in 1969, and the film Legend of the Witches (1970). These led to greater publicity, guest appearances on talk-shows, and public speaking engagements. It seemed to other witches that Sanders was exploiting the Craft and dragging it through the gutter press.

According to Maxine Sanders, Sanders never courted publicity, but was simply unable to avoid it. She describes how Sanders' initial rise to fame came through an attempt to distract media attention away from other witches. The couple running a coven that Sanders belonged to were practising Christians, and the local press had become curious about their activities. Had they been exposed it would have been disastrous for them. Sanders offered the Press an alternative story, proposing to hold a ritual at a magical site at Alderley Edge, where he would raise a man from the dead. A bandaged up figure lying on a stone altar was examined by one of Sanders' colleagues posing as a G.P., who certified it was indeed a corpse.

Alex promised the reporter and photographer that he would bring the corpse back to life. It would respond to an ancient and strange invocation, which was in reality a Swiss roll recipe read backwards. After much mumbo jumbo Alex dramatically intoned the invocation slowly and with great deliberation, the corpse couldn't help but respond to such power. It sounds ridiculous today that anyone could fall for it, but the pressmen ran away with their story, which made the headlines. These were the days of innocence, but the Christians were safe and Alex was on his way to a life of self-imposed notoriety.

— Sanders, M.

Sanders frequently appeared in ritual photos as robed or wearing only a loincloth, while the other witches that surrounded him were skyclad, or naked. His explanation for this was that "Witch law" required that the elder of a coven to be apart from the others and easily identifiable.

In 1970, Sanders met Stewart Farrar at the preview of Legend of the Witches. Farrar was a feature writer for the weekly Reveille and was working on a story concerning modern Witchcraft. He was interested in Sanders, and at some point during the evening Sanders invited him to an initiation at his coven. Farrar was later initiated by Maxine Sanders into that same coven, where he also met his future wife, Janet Owen; Farrar and Owen formed their own magical partnership and their own coven in 1970 and wrote many books on witchcraft together.

== Later years ==
Alex and Maxine separated in 1971, with Alex moving to Sussex and Maxine remaining in the London flat, where she continued running the coven and teaching the Alexandrian Witchcraft. A son, Victor Mikhael, was born in 1972. Alex and Maxine's strong relationship continued, "although it varied in intensity, from a fierce sense of loyalty, blasting curses, to declarations of love until his death in 1988".

In 1979, Sanders announced to the witchcraft community that he wished "to make amends for some of the past hurts that I have given and many public stupidities I created for others of the Craft", and expressed his desire that the Wica should some day put aside their differences and "unite in brotherly love before the face of the Lady and the Lord", allowing them to become great again and respected in the outside world.

From 1979 onwards, Sanders began working in magical partnership with Derek Taylor, a psychic and trance medium. Together, they developed the magical work of Sanders' Order, the Ordine Della Luna in Constantinople, which he was chartered to operate as Grand Prior for England and Wales by a contact in London in 1967 who claimed to be a descendant of the Byzantine Palaeologos dynasty, but who was actually an eccentric Englishman of Newport on the Isle of Man called Peter Francis Mills. The pair were reportedly working with celestial intelligences, disembodied spirits, and the demiurge itself. They recorded several journals of channelled notes, including warning of an apocalyptic World War III.

Another group which Sanders operated in London during the 1960s was the Order of Deucalion, a focus for Atlantean magical research and inner contacts, as Sanders taught that Merlin was an important leader of the last Atlantean migratory wave into Western Europe. The Order of Deucalion existed as an inner cell of the Ordine Della Luna.

Sanders died on April 30, 1988, after suffering from lung cancer.

At Lammas 1998, ten years after his death, a New England Wiccan coven claimed to have contacted Sanders in spirit. The group alleged that the communications continued until 2003.

== Works ==
- Sanders, O. Alexander (1984). The Alex Sanders Lectures. New York: Magickal Childe Publishing, Inc.
