= Kitchen witchcraft =

Form of witchcraft focused on cooking

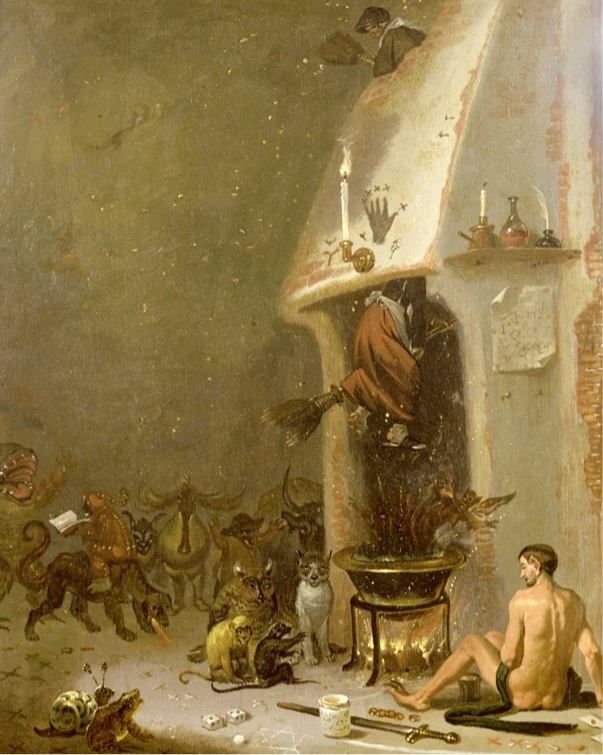
A Witch's Tavern (also known as The Witches' Kitchen) by Cornelis Saftleven (1607–1681)

Kitchen witchcraft, also known as home witchcraft, cottage witchcraft, hearth witchcraft, or kitchen magick, is a form of witchcraft centered on cooking. The practice is found in neopaganism.

== Overview ==
=== History ===
Kitchen witchcraft has existed throughout history. In certain ancient cultures, hearths were seen as sacred and the act of cooking was seen as a practice of magic. Many historical kitchen witches were midwives, wise women, and matriarchs as women did house work in certain traditional cultures. Some were also revered in leadership roles. Herbs were used frequently in the practices of cunning folk and some were herbalists. Historically, wise women prepared meals and herbal teas meant to divert infections and diseases, as they practiced healing. Some of these meals were broths and soups. These practices were also practiced by shamans.

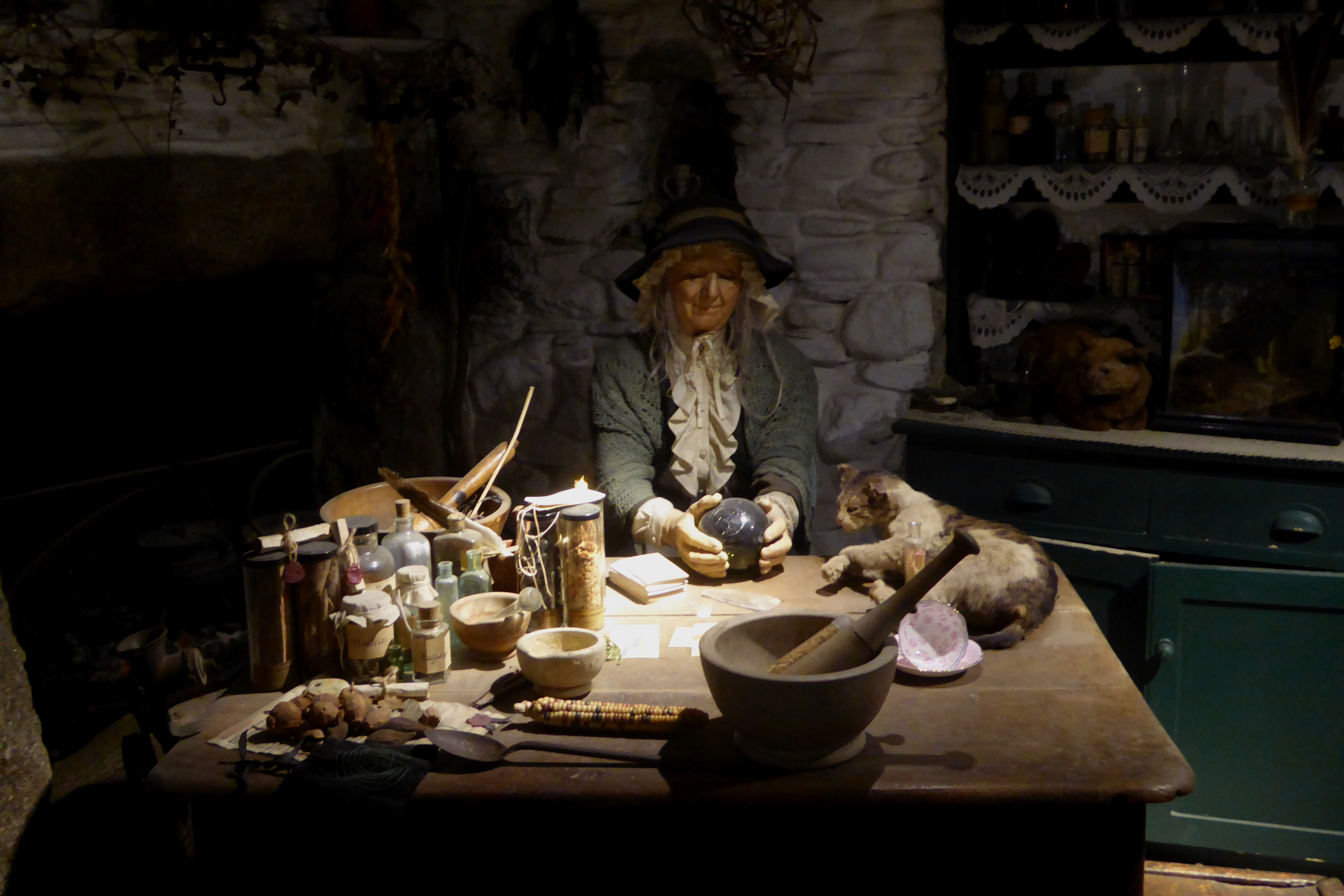
A diorama of a cunning woman on display in the Museum of Witchcraft and Magic, Boscastle, Cornwall.

=== Practices ===
The kitchen can be considered a sacred or blessed space to practice kitchen witchcraft. One way kitchen witchcraft is practiced is setting intention for whatever meal is being cooked or baked. Herbs can be used in this practice, as specific herbs may be considered to have specific magical practices such as chamomile and lavender for relieving anxiety. Some of the practices in kitchen witchcraft is potion-making. Rituals combined with the act of cooking may be done as well.
