= Sexual polarity =

Concept of dualism between masculine and feminine

Sexual polarity is a concept of dualism between masculine and feminine. More generally, the term may be used to denote mutual opposition between sexual ideologies.

"the very dichotomy man/woman as an opposition between two rival entities may be understood as belonging to metaphysics"

— Julia Kristeva

Metaphorical symbolism of sexual polarity is deeply intertwined in cultural understandings of nature. Conceptions of male and female poles are developed through history in relation to each other.

== Measurement ==
Researchers at the University of Connecticut devised a scale of sexual polarity between right-wing and left-wing sexual ideologies. In a study of 140 undergraduates, correlations along this scale were shown between right-wing sexual ideologies and both church attendance and sex-guilt.

== Bacterial conjugation ==
Sexual differentiation may be seen between pairs of bacteria cells engaged in bacterial conjugation. The genetic-element donor may be characterized as having a 'male' sexual polarity and the recipient a 'female' sexual polarity.

== Feminist literature ==
Historical blurring of boundaries between male and female poles has necessitated debates regarding maintenance of social order, particularly during periods of rapid change.

Shulamith Firestone's The Dialectic of Sex presents a vision of radical feminism calling for division of culture into two modes, Technological and Aesthetic, married by a 'union of opposites'. Chris Middleton argues that this dual organization is intended to reflect and replace the existing sexual polarity of culture.

In Alternative Shakespeare, Cotherine Belsey uses sexual polarity as lens for both interpretation of William Shakespeare's comedies and in critique of second-wave feminism.

== Self-help ==
Sexual polarity is sometimes presented in New Age spirituality and self-help materials. In The Way of the Superior Man, David Deida discusses challenges related to the ethical expression of masculine polarity. On the Robbins Research International website, life coach Tony Robbins presents an explanation of sexual polarity in relation to intimate relationships and sexual attraction.

== See also ==
- Dualistic cosmology
- Sexual attraction
