= Secespita =

Roman ceremonial knife

Latin: Secespita, cultrum ferreum, oblongum, manubrio eburneo, rotundo, solido, vincto ad capulum argento auroque fixum, clavis aeneis, aere Cyprio, quo flamines, flaminicae, virgines pontificesque ad sacrificia utebantur. Dicta autem est secespita a secando.

— Antistius Labeo

The secespita is a long iron sacrificial knife, made of brass and copper from Cyprus, with a solid and rounded ivory handle, which is secured to the hilt by a ring of silver or gold. The flamens and their wives, the flaminicae, who were priests and priestesses of the Ancient Rome, the virgins and the pontiffs made use of it for sacrifices. This knife derives its name from the Latin verb seco (present infinitive secare) meaning "to cut".

== Accounts ==
Roman historian Suetonius wrote about secespita in the Liber III (third book) Tiberius' part of his The Twelve Caesars, published in 121:

Latin: nam et inter pontifices sacrificanti simul pro secespita plumbeum cultrum subiciendum curavit et secretum petenti non nisi adhibito Druso filio dedit dextramque obambulantis veluti incumbens, quoad perageretur sermo, continuit.	English: Thus when Libo was offering sacrifice with him among the pontiffs, he had a leaden knife substituted for the usual one, and when he asked for a private interview, Tiberius would not grant it except with his son Drusus present, and as long as the conference lasted he held fast to Libo's right arm, under pretence of leaning on it as they walked together.

Some modern writers, based on an unconfirmed description of Paul the Deacon and his epitome of Festus, see it to be an axe, a cleaver, or a dolabra, and others again a knife (Latin: culter). There are Roman coins representing sacrificial emblems where it is possible to see an axe, which modern writers call a secespita. Its proper purpose seems to have been for opening the body of a victim, which had been slain with the securis, the malleus, or the culter depending on the size of the victim, and then to extract the entrails. It was appropriated to the higher order of priests, to whom this function belonged, but who did not themselves slay the sacrificial victim.

== See also ==
- Ancient Rome
  - Religion in ancient Rome
  - Roman festivals
  - Roman mythology
  - Roman polytheistic reconstructionism

== Sources ==
- Sextus Pompeius Festus; Marcus Verrius Flaccus; Paul the Deacon (1839) [2nd century]. Muller, Karl Otfried (ed.). De verborum significatione quae supersunt: cum Pauli epitome. Lipsiae: Weidmanniana. pp. 348–349, 437, 473. OCLC 705799245.
- Servius (1881) [4th-century]. Thilo, Georgius; Hagen, Hermannus (eds.). Vergilii carmina comentarii. Servii Grammatici qui feruntur in Vergilii carmina commentarii [Commentary on Virgil] (in Latin). Leipzig: B. G. Teubner. p. 262.
- Smith, William; Wayte, William; Marindin, G. E. (1890). "SECE´SPITA". A Dictionary of Greek and Roman Antiquities (3rd ed.). Albemarle Street, London: John Murray. OCLC 1084048.
- Gai Suetoni Tranquilli (121). "Tiberius: XXV". De vita Caesarum [On the Life of the Caesars] (in Latin). Vol. Liber III. p. 17 line 10.
  Related books:
  - Suetonius; Pike, Joseph B. (1903) [121]. "Tiberius". In Bennett, Charles E.; Rolfe, John C. (eds.). Gai Suetoni Tranquilli De vita Caesarum libri III-VI: Tiberius, Caligula, Claudius, Nero (in Latin). Vol. Liber III. Boston: Allyn & Bacon. p. 17 line 10. OL 24155623M.
  - Suetonius (2004). The Lives of the Caesars. Kessinger. p. 123. ISBN 9781419170416.
