= Great rite =

Wiccan ritual

The great rite is a Wiccan ritual involving symbolic sexual intercourse with the purpose of drawing energy from the powerful connection between a male and female. Both receive more power. It is an uncommon ritual in a full coven, as it is used when the coven is in need of powerful spiritual intervention. Most often it is performed by the high priest and priestess of a coven, but other participants can be selected to perform the rite.

== Symbolic version of the great rite ==
In the symbolic version the high priestess plunges the athame, or ritual knife that represents the masculine, into a cup or chalice which represents the feminine. The chalice is filled with wine and is held by the high priest. The great rite symbolizes creation in the union of the maiden goddess with the lover god, and thus is also known as a fertility rite.

== Occasions for the great rite ==
A variety of ritual occasions call for the great rite to be performed, such as during the festival of Beltane on or about May 1 in the northern hemisphere and November 1 in the southern hemisphere.

== See also ==
- Ganachakra
- Hieros gamos
- Liber XV, The Gnostic Mass
- Sexual ritual
- Yab-Yum
- Black mass
- Witches' Sabbath
