= Émile-Jules Grillot de Givry =

Translator and Occultist

Émile Jules Grillot called Émile-Jules Grillot de Givry (or Émile-Angelo Grillot de Givry) (5 August 1874 in Paris – 16 February 1929 in Paris) was a French Catholic man of letters and occultist and pacifist, translator into French of numerous alchemical works including those of Paracelsus. He may have been a Freemason

== Biography ==
Son of Claude Grillot and Marie Louise Adenot he studied in Paris with the Jesuits of the Rue de Vaugirard. He studied music and oriental languages before becoming interested in Christian hermeticism. Working as a music teacher, he married Virginie Doco on 2 September 1905. He also made a living teaching French and, between 1910 and 1920, as an organist in a Parisian church.

He came into contact with Parisian occult circles, with figures such as Stanislas de Guaita, Gérard Encausse and Péladan, soon becoming, although young, one of the most famous and respected Hermetic scholars.

== Works ==
It would be on reading "Là-bas" by Joris-Karl Huysmans that Émile-Jules Grillot de Givry became passionate about the occult: Huysmans considered him to be "the greatest expert in Christian symbolism".

His taste for aesthetics, as well as his Catholicism, led him, at a very young age, to enter the circle of Péladan's closest collaborators, in the Ordre de la Rose-Croix Catholique et Esthetique du Temple et du Graal (Order of the Catholic and Aesthetic Rosicrucian of the Temple and the Grail) which at that time acquired considerable fame with his Salons. At the same time, he was initiated into the Rite of Memphis-Misraim of which his friend Dr Gérard Encausse (Papus) had become a grandmaster.

But it is not certain that Grillot de Givry was initiated into the Memphis Israim rite. Some authors, themselves Freemasons, with whom he worked in the various magazines to which he contributed, have stated that he was not a member of Freemasonry. For example Jean Reyor, who was also close to René Guénon, wrote in the journal Études Traditionnelles in 1959, on the occasion of the second edition of the work Lourdes, ville initiatique :

Ce qui est certain, par contre,c’est que dès sa 23e année au plus tard, Grillot de Givry participe de façon importante, par des traductions, à la Bibliothèque Rosicrucienne financée par René Philipon (Jean Tabris) et qui paraissait sous les auspices de l'Ordre Maçonnique de Misraïm. Cependant, Grillot de Givry n’appartenait pas non plus à cet Ordre Maçonnique : des dédicaces, à lui adressées et que nous avons eues sous les yeux, auraient été rédigées autrement qu’elles ne le sont s’il avait été un "Frère", comme les autres collaborateurs de la collection.

Translation:

What is certain, however, is that from his 23rd year at the latest, Grillot de Givry played an important part, through translations, in the Bibliothèque Rosicrucienne financed by René Philipon (Jean Tabris) and which appeared under the auspices of the Rite of Memphis-Misraim. However, Grillot de Givry did not belong to this Masonic Order either: the dedications addressed to him, which we have before us, would have been written differently than they are if he had been a "Brother", like the other contributors to the collection,

.

Jean Reyor then points out that Grillot was a practising Catholic. Therefore, according to him, the latter probably never joined Freemasonry, anxious to avoid the risk of excommunication.

In 1895–1896, he was part of the editorial board of the magazine La renaissance idéaliste (The idealistic renaissance) edited by René Albert Fleury and the Comte Léonce de Larmandie. In this magazine he began to develop pacifist themes which he supported throughout his life and which he explained in his book, Le Christ et la Patrie.

In Masonic lodges, he met René Philipon for whom he made, between 1888 and 1890, several translations of the Bibliothèque Rosicrucienne of Henri Chacornac, father of Paul Chacornac, Parisian publishers owners of the Éditions Traditionnelles.

Parallel to his work at the Rosicrucian Library, he began his translations: the Traité de la pierre philosophale (Treatise on the Philosopher's Stone) attributed to Saint Thomas Aquinas, the Adumbratio kabbalae christianae of Franciscus Mercurius van Helmont followed by the translation of the famous Amphitheatrum sapientiae aeternae of Khunrath

He then translated Absconditorum clavis of Guillaume Postel then the Savonarola's Treatise of the Seven Degrees of Perfection and, a few months later, the Basilian Aphorisms. In the following years, he published the translation of Paracelsus' Traité des trois essences premières (Chacornac, Paris 1903), which was the beginning of the two volumes of the translation of Paracelsus' Complete Works.

In 1911, he published Le Christ et la Patrie. A documented study on the theoretical and theological incompatibility between Christianity and militarism. Initially ignored, the text was suddenly popular after the First World War. In 1924, a second edition was published and the book became one of the cornerstones of French anti-militarist literature.

The supreme error of modern Catholics, to which they are even more invincibly attached than to their dogmas, is to be patriots, even more patriotic than Catholics, and thus to want to serve, against the formal order of Christ, two irreconcilable masters.

— Émile-Jules Grillot de Givry, Le Christ et la Patrie

In 1925 and 1926, he translated into French both the Monas Hieroglyphica of John Dee and The Kabbalah of Jacques Casanova of Bernhard Marr.

He collaborated with the magazine Le Voile d'Isis, became a friend of Léon Bloy and René Guénon and translated old lost texts from the Corpus Hermeticum: Nicolas Flamel, Basil Valentine, Dom Pernety.

The Masonic precepts or Masonic code have been wrongly attributed to him insofar as they can be read in the Journal historique et littéraire (Historical and Literary Journal) of 1839

== Bibliography ==
- Lourdes, ville initiatique (in French). Paris: Éditions Chacornac. 1902. p. 372., reissued in 1959, 214 p.; then by Éditions Archè, 2009, 448 p.,ISBN 9788872522929.
- Le grand œuvre – XII méditations sur la voie ésotérique de l'Absolu (in French). Paris: Bibliothèque Chacornac. 1907.
- Le Christ et la patrie (in French). Paris: Bibliothèque Chacornac. 1911.
- Anthologie de l'occultisme. Paris: Éd. De la Sirène. 1922.
- André Bourrier; Grillot de Givry; Han Ryner (1925). La vérité sur le supplice de Jeanne d'Arc, victime de l'Église : la Pucelle a-t-elle été brûlée ? S'est-elle échappée et mariée (in French). Conflans-Sainte-Honorine: L'Idée libre.
- His latest book: Musée des sorciers, mages et alchimistes (in French). Imp. De Compiègne: Librairie de France. 1929. Translated by J. Courtenay Locke: The Picture Museum of Sorcery, Magic and Alchemy. New York: University Books Inc. 1963.
