= Janet Farrar =

British writer and Wiccan priestess

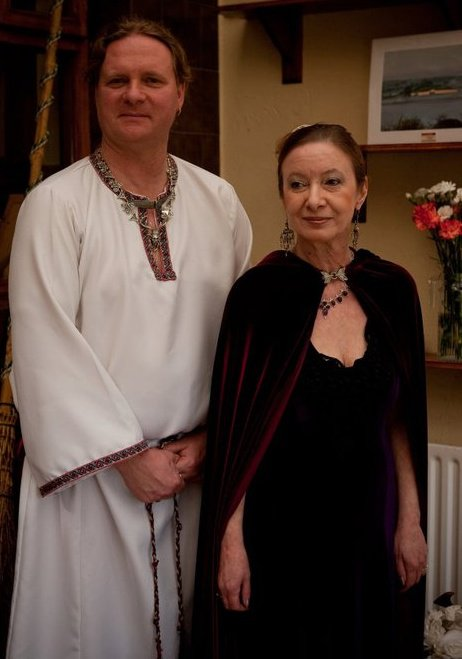
- Janet Farrar with Gavin Bone
- Born: 24 June 1950 (age 75); Clapham, London, England
- Occupation(s): Writer and Wiccan Priestess
- Spouse(s): Stewart Farrar and Gavin Bone

Janet Farrar (born Janet Owen on 24 June 1950) is a British teacher and author of books on Wicca and Neopaganism. Along with her two husbands, Stewart Farrar and Gavin Bone, she has published "some of the most influential books on modern Witchcraft to date". According to George Knowles, "some seventy five percent of Wiccans both in the Republic and Northern Ireland can trace their roots back to the Farrars."

Farrar has been one of the most public faces of Wicca, having appeared as a model for book covers and illustrations in several of the best-read books on the subject. She is a frequent guest lecturer on the subjects of Wicca, Neopaganism and witchcraft in North America and Europe.

== Early life ==
Janet Owen was born in Clacton in 1950. Her family, of mixed English, Irish and Welsh descent, were members of the Church of England. She attended the Leyton Manor School, and the Royal Wanstead High School girls' school. After high school, Janet worked as a model and receptionist.

== Wicca ==
She was initiated into Alexandrian Wicca by the tradition's founders, Alex and Maxine Sanders. She met the Sanders in 1970 through a friend who had become interested in exploring Wicca. Janet accompanied her friend to keep the friend "out of this weird cult", but she instead joined the Sanders coven, and would go on to become, in the words of Knowles, one of "England's most eminent and respected modern day witches." In the coven she met Stewart Farrar, her future husband and co-author.

Janet and Stewart Farrar were both elevated to the second degree "in an unoccupied house in Sydenham" by the Sanders on 17 October 1970, and they received the third, and final, degree of initiation in their flat on 24 April 1971. Both events are well-recorded by Stewart Farrar down to the smallest detail in his diaries.

The Farrars began running their own coven in 1971, before their third degree initiation ceremony. They were handfasted in 1972 and legally married in 1975. Janet Farrar left the coven in 1972 to explore Kabbala with a ceremonial magic lodge, but returned the same year. In 1976 the Farrars moved to Ireland to get away from the busy life of London. They lived in County Mayo and County Wexford, finally settling in "Herne Cottage" in Kells, County Meath. Both husband and wife went on to publish a number of books on the Wiccan religion and on coven practices. Farrar continued to model and appeared in the illustrations to multiple early books about Wicca, including the cover of the paperback version of Margot Adler's 1979 Drawing Down the Moon.

Farrar also posed for many of the photographs in their 1981 Eight Sabbats for Witches, which included material the authors claimed to be from the Alexandrian tradition's Book of Shadows. The Farrars, with the support of Doreen Valiente, argued in the book that even though the publishing of this material broke their oath of secrecy, it was justified by the need to correct misinformation.

Janet Farrar indicates that some of the rituals contained in the couple's books were actually written by them, and that they left the Alexandrian tradition after the book's research was complete. The couple co-authored four more books on Wicca. Janet Farrar's post-Alexandrian practice has been referred to as "Reformed Alexandrian".

They were joined by Gavin Bone in 1993, with whom they entered into a "polyfidelitous relationship". The three of them would co-author two more books, The Healing Craft and The Pagan Path, an investigation into the many varieties of Neopaganism. Stewart Farrar died in February 2000 after a brief illness. Janet Farrar and Gavin Bone married in a handfasting in May 2001, and then legally married in Northern Ireland (part of Ulster) in March 2014.

After Stewart Farrar's death, Janet Farrar and Gavin Bone continued to author books, and have given a number of lectures on Wicca in the United States, Australia, New Zealand, South Africa, Italy and in Britain. The title of their 2004 book, Progressive Witchcraft, is the description that the couple prefers for their current religious practice. This was re-released in 2013 as a new edition called Inner Mysteries. Their current area of work is in trance-prophesy, trance-possession and ecstatic ritual and they are currently working on a major book on the subject which they hope to release with Acorn Guild Publishing in 2014. They are also founders of The Alliance of Progressive Covens, which includes linked groups and covens in the United States, Ireland and Italy.

== Bibliography ==
Farrar has co-authored a number of books about Wicca and Neopaganism.

=== With Stewart Farrar ===
- 1981: Eight Sabbats for Witches
- 1981: "A Witches Bible Volume I & II"
- 1984: The Witches' Way
- 1987: The Witches' Goddess: The Feminine Principle of Divinity
- 1987: The Life & Times of a Modern Witch
- 1989: The Witches' God: Lord of the Dance
- 1990: Spells and How they Work
- 1996: A Witches' Bible: The Complete Witches' Handbook (re-issue of The Witches' Way and Eight Sabbats for Witches)

=== With Stewart Farrar and Gavin Bone ===
- 1995: The Pagan Path
- 1999: The Healing Craft: Healing Practices for Witches and Pagans
- 2001: The Complete Dictionary of European Gods and Goddesses

=== With Virginia Russell ===
- 1992: The Magical History of the Horse

=== With Gavin Bone ===
- 2004: Progressive Witchcraft: Spirituality, Mysteries, and Training in Modern Wicca
- 2013: The Inner Mysteries: Progressive Witchcraft and Connection with the Divine
- 2016: Lifting the Veil: A Witches' Guide to Trance-Prophesy…

== Notes and references ==
- The wiccan ways- Applionicisiumn - Rebecca M. Lee
