= Stewart Farrar =

British writer and Wiccan (1916–2000)

- Born: 28 June 1916; Highams Park, Essex, England
- Died: 7 February 2000 (aged 83); Ireland
- Occupations: Journalist; Wiccan priest
- Spouses: Jean Clarke; Jean Mackinlay; Rachael Kaplin; Beth Donovan; Barbara Williams; Janet Farrar
- Children: 4

Frank Stewart Farrar (28 June 1916 – 7 February 2000) was an English screenwriter, novelist and prominent figure in the Neopagan religion of Wicca, which he devoted much of his later life to propagating with the aid of his seventh wife, Janet Farrar, and then his friend Gavin Bone as well. A devout communist in early life, he worked as a reporter for such newspapers as the Soviet Weekly and the Daily Worker, and also served in the British army during the Second World War. He was responsible for writing episodes for such television series as Dr. Finlay's Casebook, Armchair Theatre and Crossroads, and for his work in writing radio scripts won a Writer's Guild Award. He also published a string of novels, written in such disparate genres as crime, romance and fantasy.

After being initiated into Alexandrian Wicca by Maxine Sanders in 1970, he subsequently published one of the earliest books to describe this newly burgeoning religion, What Witches Do (1971). Within only a few months of being initiated, he had risen to the position of High Priest and founded his own coven in south London, with Janet Farrar, whom he would later handfast and then legally marry, as his High Priestess. In 1976 the couple moved to Ireland, where they went about founding new covens and initiating new people into Wicca - according to George Knowles, "some seventy five per cent of Wiccans both in the Republic and North of Ireland can trace their roots back to the Farrar's [sic]". With Janet, he also set about writing books about the subject, most notably Eight Sabbats for Witches (1981) and The Witches' Way (1984).

Because of his work in propagating the Craft, the historian Ronald Hutton compared him to Gerald Gardner and Alex Sanders as "the third and last of the great male figures who have formed Wicca".

== Biography ==
=== Early life: 1916–1937 ===
Stewart Farrar was born at his family home of 239 Winchester Road, Highams Park, Essex during the First World War, and as such his father was away serving in the British army, stationed in Salonika in Greece. His family were middle class and well educated, and were also Christian Scientists, a denomination of Christianity that notably emphasised a belief in spiritual healing over conventional medicine, and which had been founded in 1886. The Farrar family had already been somewhat successful, with a number of them becoming somewhat culturally significant: the first words that had been broadcast by radio across the Atlantic, Guglielmo Marconi's "can you hear me, Picken?", for instance referred to Stewart's maternal uncle, whilst Stewart's first cousin was the notable poet James Farrar.

His father, after being demobbed from the army, took up employment at the London office of the Hong Kong and Shanghai Bank, whilst his mother ran a private school in Wallington, Surrey, before later teaching at the Christian Science primary Claremont School in Esher, Surrey, where the Farrar family took up residence in a house on the school's grounds. His sister, Jean, was born in 1920, and he subsequently doted on her, but at the same time was known as a bully towards other children at primary school.

From 1930 to 1935, Stewart attended the privately run City of London School, meaning that he had to commute daily into the city from his rural home. It was here that he joined the Officer Training Corps, where he learned much about military strategy, but at the same time disapproved of militarism and began to sympathise with left wing politics that were at odds with his conservative upbringing. At 17, he became a socialist, before later taking a further leftist stance by declaring himself a communist and rejecting Christianity, instead defining himself as an "interested agnostic". In 1935 he began attending University College London, where he studied journalism, and where he served both as president of the London University Journalism Union and editor of the London Union Magazine. After he ended his university education in 1937, he spent three months as an exchange student in Dresden, Germany, where he became fluent in German and also developed an even greater hatred of National Socialism than he already held.

=== Communism, the army and journalism: 1937–1957 ===
Returning to Britain, Farrar immersed himself in propagating communism, joining the Communist Party of Great Britain, and working for the communist tabloid, the Daily Worker. In 1939, he fell in love with and married Jean Clarke, a fellow communist.

When war broke out against Nazi Germany in 1939, he immediately volunteered for the British army, feeling that he could put his military training to good use to fight against fascism. Instead of being sent abroad to fight, he was stationed in Britain, where he was set to work training new recruits in various combat techniques, and as such was stationed at a variety of different barracks. In 1940 he was stationed at Whitstable, though soon moved to Ashford, and the following year, his first son, Tony, was born. He was subsequently moved to Pembrokeshire in Wales, where he began having an affair with his secretary. Soon after this he divorced his wife, who was also having an affair. Meanwhile, his war work largely involved working as an instructor in Anti-aircraft gunnery during World War II. He also wrote an instruction manual for a Bofors gun.

In 1945, he remarried, this time to a woman named Jean Mackinlay who was a lance-corporal in the Auxiliary Territorial Service. She would later provide him with his second child, Andy, just after Farrar himself was demobbed from the army in 1946, following the defeat of Germany. He was subsequently stationed in Berlin, where he worked as a civilian officer for the Allied Control Commission for Germany, and where, being separated from his second wife, he began to have an affair with his personal assistant, Hilke Carstens, a woman who would be described by Farrar's biographer Elizabeth Guerra as "the love of his life and the woman who was to haunt his memories for years to come." Despite his love for Hilke, who would die of food poisoning only a few years later, Farrar returned to England, where with his wife and son, he moved to Bedford, where she would bear him a second child, a daughter named Lindsay, in 1948.

Setting himself up as a journalist once more, Farrar briefly worked for the international news company Reuters, before becoming the English-language edition editor for the Soviet Weekly, a newspaper published by the Soviet Embassy. It was through this appointment that he became a great friend to a prominent communist Petrovich Baikov, who was First Secretary of the Embassy. Meanwhile, he began to have an affair with Rachael 'Rae' Kaplin, a Jewish teacher who worked as a youth organiser for the Communist Party, and eventually decided to leave his wife and children to move in and live with her. The divorce from his wife would only come through in 1950, and he subsequently married Kaplin, making her his third wife; in 1951 she would bear him his fourth and final child, Judith.

The Communist Party later appointed him secretary of the British-Polish Friendship Society, and he would take a delegation of British trade unionists to visit Poland, visiting both the former Nazi extermination camp of Auschwitz and some of the Polish coal mines. However, upon his return to Britain, he began to split from the communist Soviet Union and its policies, particularly after he was shocked at the way that they violently dealt with the Hungarian Uprising in 1957. Whilst remaining a leftist, he disassociated himself with the Communist Party of Great Britain and ceased working for the Daily Worker.

=== Scriptwriting: 1957–1969 ===
Disillusioned with the route that the communist powers were taking, and wanting nothing more to do with the Soviet Union and its allies in Britain, he took up a job working first for R.H. Radford, a public relations firm and then Associated British Pathé where he eventually rose to the position of documentary writer. Meanwhile, his continued infidelity led to him and Kaplin separating in 1953, although it would only be in 1963 that he finally gained a divorce from her. During this time, he had entered into a new relationship with a woman named Beth Donovan, and she encouraged him to continue seeing his children from previous relationships, whom in later life he always regretted neglecting; in 1958 however, they too split up. In 1959, he began yet another relationship, this time with a geography teacher named Barbara Williams, and they moved in together after only 11 days of first meeting. They would divorce in 1967, before remarrying in 1968, subsequently breaking up again the following year.

In 1958, Farrar published his first novel, The Snake on 99, a whodunit crime story involving a Welsh detective known as Elwyn Morgan. In 1961 this was followed with Zero in the Gate, another whodunit this time set around a newspaper company, drawing on his prior experiences. Two years later, his third novel, Death in the Wrong Bed, came out, followed by a romance novel, Delphine, Be a Darling, which was published under the female pseudonym of Laurie Stewart at the advice of his publisher.

The first edition cover to Farrar's debut novel, The Snake on 99

In 1961, Farrar was sent by Pathé to Saudi Arabia, where the company was producing a documentary, and during this trip he visited the deserts of both Saudi Arabia and neighbouring Jordan. At the end of the following year, he was employed by ABC Television's Advanced Religious Training Course to train priests and clergymen in television techniques, a job he held for two years, and would later reminisce about getting drunk with two archbishops on one occasion. In 1963 he was then given the chance to write a script for a film, and the result, It's All Over Town, was produced featured the actor Frankie Vaughan. Another of Farrar's most significant works was a documentary series that he scripted entitled Journey of a Lifetime, in which he travelled to the Holy Land in the Middle East to research, and later experienced what he described as an almost spiritual experience while visiting the mediaeval city of Petra.

In 1964, he began writing freelance for various British television series, starting with an episode of Dr. Finlay's Casebook, and in later years would write episodes for Armchair Theatre and the soap opera Crossroads. Farrar would also co-write a 90-minute screenplay entitled Pity About the Abbey with his friend, Sir John Betjeman, who would later be made Poet Laureate. Pity About the Abbey was a story in which Westminster Abbey was destroyed to make way for a by-pass, and satirised what Farrar saw as the current trend to demolish significant or beautiful structures. It was filmed and broadcast by the BBC in July 1965.

In 1967, Stewart's wife fell in love with one of his best friends, Norman, and so he granted her a divorce, but remained both her and Norman's friend, carrying no resentment towards them. Feeling alone, he turned to his second wife, Jean Mackinlay, who herself had just recently divorced her second husband, and although she refused his offer of reigniting their relationship, they did once more become friends. In 1968 he re-united with another former lover, Beth Donovan, and married her, but he would leave her in June 1969 when he met a new woman, Isabel Sutherland, and subsequently moved in with her and her daughter. Meanwhile, in 1968 he won a Writer's Guild Award for his six-part radio serial Watch the Wall my Darling, which was based upon the poem A Smuggler's Song by one of his favourite poets, Rudyard Kipling. Following this, in February of the following year, he once more returned to journalism, taking up employment with the popular weekly magazine Reveille.

=== Involvement with Wicca: 1969–2000 ===
Farrar was sent by Reveille to a press screening of the film Legend of the Witches. The screening was also attended by Alex Sanders and Maxine Sanders, the founders of Alexandrian Wicca, who had served as advisors during the film's creation. According to his biography at mystica.com, Farrar was "skeptical about Witchcraft but was interested in Sanders upon meeting him". The paper requested that Farrar interview Sanders and published the interview as a two-part story. Sanders, "impressed" with the interview, invited Farrar to attend an Alexandrian Wiccan initiation ritual, and prompted Farrar to write an entire book on Wicca. According to mystica.com, Farrar "found the ceremony both dignified and moving". Farrar began work on his first non-fiction book, What Witches Do, and began taking classes on witchcraft from the Sanders'. Maxine Sanders remembers Farrar as "a charming man, a sincere student with an active flexible mind". Maxine Sanders also notes that it was in response to Farrar's questions about how to describe their practice in his book that the Alexandrian tradition was named.

On 21 February 1970 Farrar was initiated into Alexandrian Wicca and joined the Sanders' coven. Farrar met his future wife, then Janet Owen (34 years his junior), in the coven. Janet Farrar asserts that the couple were both elevated to the second degree "in an unoccupied house in Sydenham" by the Sanders on 17 October 1970, and that they received the third, and final, degree of initiation in their flat 24 April 1971. Two of Janet and Stewart's coven - "Don and Barbara" were present, as were the Sanders coven. Janet Farrar remembers the initiation well, as Maxine invoked Sekhmet to banish one of her coven members. She broke her flail during this banishing. Recently their 3rd Degree initiation has been disputed by some Alexandrian "revisionists", unaware that Stewart Farrar kept an archive of all his correspondences with the Sanders and possessed copies of both his own and the Sanders' coven records that unequivocally prove that the initiation took place. What Witches Do was published in 1971. The book has been called "controversial" because of Farrar's assertion that Sanders should be "ranked above Gerald B. Gardner and alongside Aleister Crowley and Eliphas Levi in terms of magical achievement". Farrar later backed away from the assessment, although he did later state that he believed that Sanders "was both a charlatan and a genuine magician". The relationship between Alex Sanders and Stewart Farrar became one of mutual respect after letters began to be exchanged between them in 1977. To quote Sanders (8 March 1997):

Your letters give off good vibrations of work and happiness. I feel that all our growing pains concerning publicity and personalities of the Wicca, are beginning to bear fruit. A few of us in the midst of many are beginning to establish the foundation (I mean the building itself) on the raw materials, to get the foundation stone in place.

They remained in dialogue until Alex Sanders' death in the late 1980s.

Farrar and Owen had begun running their own coven in 1971, before their third degree initiation ceremony, and were handfasted in 1972 and legally married in 1975. The ceremony was attended by Farrar's two daughters and two sons from three previous marriages - his marriage to Owen was his sixth. The late 1970s saw the publication of several more novels by Farrar, all of which were occult-themed fantasy novels or science fiction. Farrar left Reveille to pursue a full-time freelance writing career in 1974. In 1976 the Farrars moved to Ireland to get away from the busy life of London. They lived in County Mayo and County Wexford, finally settling in "Herne Cottage" in Kells, County Meath. Both husband and wife went on to publish a number of "classic" and "influential" books on the Wiccan religion and on coven practices. Their 1981 Eight Sabbats for Witches included material the authors claimed to be from the Alexandrian tradition's Book of Shadows. The Farrars, with the support of Doreen Valiente, argued in the book that even though the publishing of this material broke their oath of secrecy, it was justified by the need to correct misinformation. Janet Farrar indicates that some of the rituals contained in the couple's books were actually written by them, this includes the Oak King/Holly King cycle which they researched from Robert Graves's The White Goddess. This was the first use of this cycle in any Wiccan Book of Shadows, and has been adopted into many traditions since. Although they never officially left the Alexandrian tradition, after the book's research was complete they stopped using the term to describe themselves. The couple co-authored four more books on Wicca.

They were joined by Gavin Bone, with whom they entered into a "polyfidelitous relationship". The three of them would co-author two more books; The Healing Craft and The Pagan Path (an investigation into the many varieties of Neopaganism). In 1999 the Farrars received the Aquarian Tabernacle Church charter for Ireland, and were ordained as third level clergy.

== Death ==
Farrar died on 7 February 2000 after a brief illness.

A biography on Stewart Farrar entitled Writer on a Broomstick by Elizabeth Guerra was published in February 2008 by R. J. Stewart books.

== Bibliography ==
The following books, written by Farrar as the sole author are works of fiction, with the exception of What Witches Do.

- Farrar, Stewart (1958). The snake on 99. London: Collins Press.
- Farrar, Stewart (1961). Zero in the Gate. New York: Walker.
- Farrar, Stewart (1963). Death in the Wrong Bed. New York: Walker.
- Laurie, Stewart (1963). Delphine, Be a Darling. London: Hurst & Blackett.
- Farrar, Stewart (1971). What Witches Do: A Modern Coven Revealed. London: Peter Davies. ISBN 0-9630657-7-7.
- Farrar, Stewart (1973). The Twelve Maidens. London: Michael Joseph. ISBN 1-57863-390-7.
- Villiers, Margot (1976). The Serpent of Lilith. London: Arrow Books.
- Farrar, Stewart (1977). The Dance of Blood. London: Arrow Books.
- Farrar, Stewart (1977). The Sword of Orley. London: Michael Joseph.
- Farrar, Stewart (1980). Omega. London: Arrow Books. ISBN 1-57863-389-3.
- Farrar, Stewart (1986). Forcible Entry. London: Robert Hale.
- Farrar, Stewart (1988). Blacklash. London: Robert Hale.
- Farrar, Stewart (1996). Witches' Dozen. New Bern, North Carolina: Godolphin House.

=== With Janet Farrar ===
The following are non-fiction books.

- Eight Sabbats for Witches (1981) Robert Hale, London ISBN 0-7091-8579-0
- The Witches' Way (1984) Robert Hale, London ISBN 0-7090-1293-4
- The Witches' Goddess: The Feminine Principle of Divinity (1987) Robert Hale, London ISBN 0-919345-91-3
- The Life and Times of a Modern Witch (1987) Piatkus Books, London ISBN 0-86188-631-3
- The Witches' God: Lord of the Dance (1989) Robert Hale, London ISBN 0-919345-47-6
- Spells and How They Work (1990) Robert Hale, London ISBN 0-7090-3842-9
- A Witches' Bible: The Complete Witches' Handbook (1996 re-issue of The Witches' Way and Eight Sabbats for Witches) Robert Hale, London ISBN 978-0-7090-7227-0

=== With Janet Farrar and Gavin Bone ===
- Pagan Path: The Wiccan Way of Life (1995) Phoenix Publishing ISBN 0-919345-40-9
- The Healing Craft: Healing Practices for Witches and Pagans (1999) Phoenix Publications Inc., Custer, WA ISBN 0-7090-6563-9
- The Complete Dictionary of European Gods and Goddesses (2000) Capall Bann Publishers ISBN 1-86163-122-7
- Progressive Witchcraft (2004) New Pages Books ISBN 1-56414-719-3
