= Mary Ellen Tracy =

American religious leader (born 1943)

High Pri. Mary Ellen Tracy
- Born: 1943 (age 82–83)
- Other name: Sabrina Aset
- Occupations: Kemetic-style Neopagan high priestess; writer; actress
- Years active: 1984–present
- Spouse: Wilbur Tracy

Mary Ellen Tracy (aka Sabrina Aset) (born 1943) is the high priestess of the Church of the Most High Goddess, who was convicted in 1989 of a single misdemeanor count of running a house of prostitution in connection with the operation of the church, located in West Los Angeles, California. Tracy is a graduate of the University of Miami, cum laude in chemistry, did graduate work in chemistry at UCLA, and received her masters in Environmental Sciences/Chemistry from Portland State University.

== The Church ==
According to Mary Ellen and Wilbur Tracy, the couple – both former devout and dedicated Mormons – created and founded the Modern Egyptian neo-pagan Church of the Most High Goddess following a divine revelation received at an oceanside cottage in Santa Monica, California, in the year 1984. In testimony later given in a Los Angeles superior court, Wilbur Tracy described "a brilliant light," through which "knowledge was being poured in without voice." Tracy further claimed that God appeared to her as an old man, with flowing white beard and long white hair.

On April 24, 1984, in broad daylight, I had a revelation that changed my life and the way I perceive the world and others. However, because I was blinded by the ignorance of the modern education, which I foolishly accepted as knowledge, I did not immediately understand the full impact of the revelation. I failed to understand that the mind can perceive only what the mind can conceive. What I experienced was beyond my conception, while my perception was completely distorted by what I had been taught was enlightenment. It was only when I set aside my prejudices – those beliefs which I had been conditioned to accept as fact, but which were in fact false – that I began to understand the experience.

As a result of their alleged divine experience, Mary Ellen and Wilbur Tracy founded the Church of the Most High Goddess, with precepts based on their own research into ancient Egyptian practices. Tracy, a classical scholar in her own right, assumed the role of High Priestess of the church, whose divine duties included engaging in sexual intercourse with congregants. According to Tracy herself, she had sex with over 2,000 men as part of a ritual of spiritual cleansing. In a post on her church's website, Tracy, who is bisexual, stated that she had had sexual contact with thousands of men and women over the course of her religious activities.

As a result of her various legal difficulties, Mary Ellen Tracy was asked to permanently discontinue her voluntary work with the Placerita Canyon Nature Center in Newhall, California.

During the late 1980s, The Newhall Signal, a daily newspaper published in Los Angeles County, presented a series of articles about the Church of the Most High Goddess, founded by Mary Ellen Tracy and her husband Wilbur Tracy, where sexual acts played a fundamental role in the church's sacred rites. The articles aroused the attention of local law enforcement officials, and in April 1989, the Tracy's house, located at 6601 West 5th St, Los Angeles, was searched and the couple arrested on charges of pimping, pandering and prostitution. They were subsequently convicted in a trial in state court and sentenced to jail terms: Wilbur Tracy for 180 days plus a $1,000.00 fine; Mary Ellen Tracy for 90 days plus mandatory screening for STDs.

== Film and television ==
During the early 1990s, Mary Ellen Tracy hosted her own public-access television talk show series, Sabrina On ... . She has also appeared in a number of x-rated films under a variety of stage names, including the Positively Pagan series, and Club Head 2 (1991). On January 29, 1992, Mary Ellen Tracy was featured on a television broadcast of Donahue, as well as The Montel Williams Show, appearing with such other New-Age spiritualists as Aidan Kelly, First Officer of the Southern California Local Council of the Covenant of the Goddess, and Avilynn Waters of the Los Angeles Nest of the Church of All Worlds.

== See also ==
- Devadasi
- Goddess movement
- Homosexuality in ancient Egypt
- Reclaiming (Neopaganism)
- Sex magic
- Sex worker
