= Maxine Sanders =

British Wiccan priestess

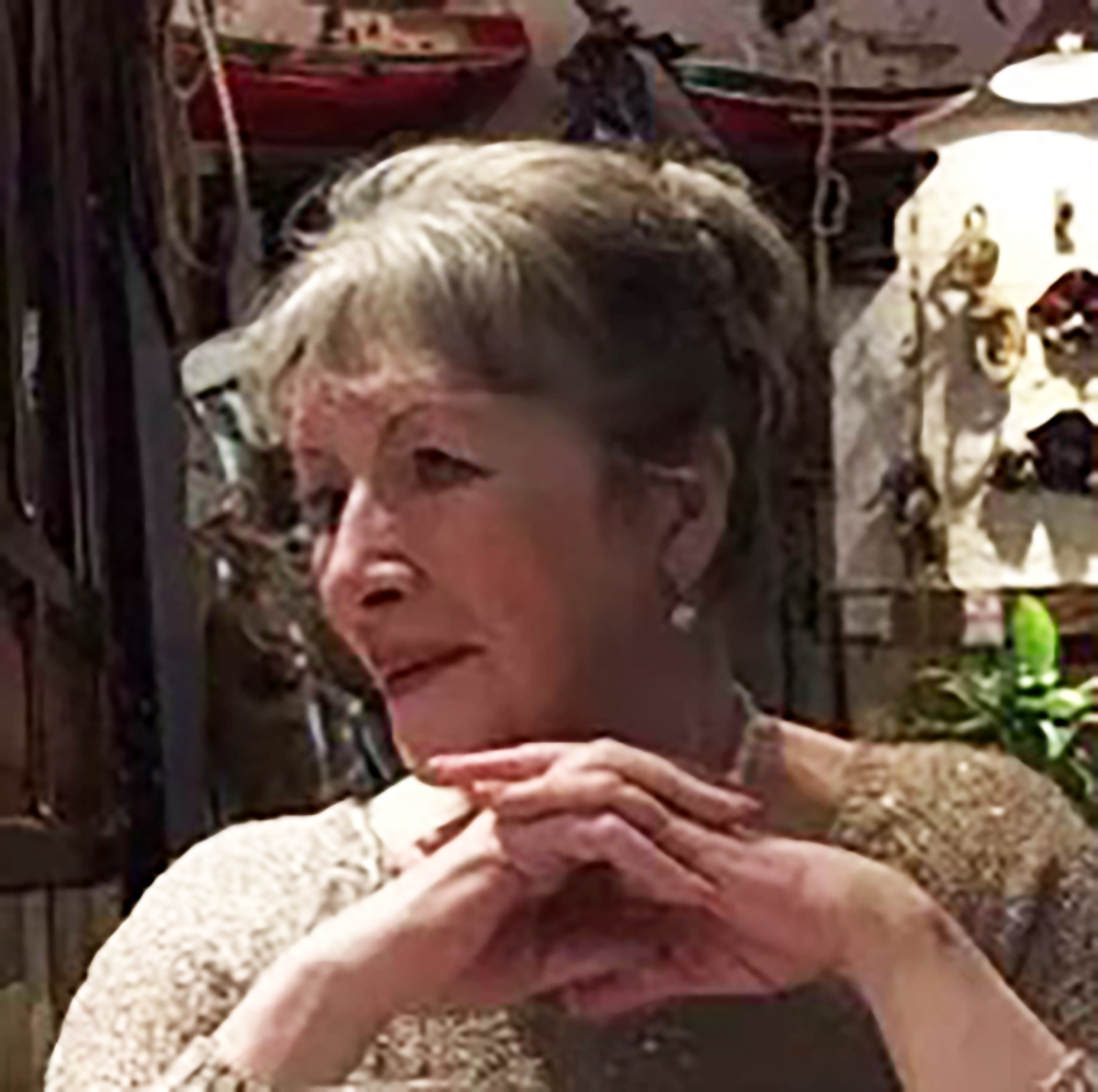
- Sanders circa 2017
- Born: Arline Maxine Morris; 30 December 1946 (age 79); Cheshire, England
- Occupations: Alexandrian Witch and Priestess, Co-Founder of the Alexandrian Tradition of Witchcraft
- Spouse: Alex Sanders
- Children: 2

Maxine Sanders (born Arline Maxine Morris; 30 December 1946, in Cheshire) is a key figure in the development of modern pagan witchcraft and Wicca and, along with her late husband, Alex Sanders, the co-founder of Alexandrian Wicca.

== Witchcraft with Alex Sanders 1964–72 ==
Raised a Roman Catholic, Maxine was educated at St. Joseph's Convent School in Manchester. In 1964, whilst a student at Loreburn Secretarial College, she first met Alex Sanders. They met through his friendship with her mother who had a range of esoteric interests but their accounts of her introduction to witchcraft vary. Alex's memoir describes her as "shy and inexperienced," with her potential being awoken only through her contact with him. Maxine's memoir gives a very different account, describing her experiences of witchcraft as already having been initiated at the age of 15 into a magical lodge in rituals performed in Alderley Edge, Cheshire, England. By the following year, she and at least one other person had been initiated and the coven was up and running. Maxine was quickly taken through the system of three degrees and by the age of 18 was a third degree Witch Queen although one source suggests that at that time her role was a somewhat passive one. It was said that at Alex's lectures all Maxine had to do was to "sit there in her finery." It is alleged that Alex said, "All I want you to do is sit there and look beautiful and represent the Goddess."

Maxine's early career as a witch was not free from difficulties. In 1965, a midsummer ritual was attended by a newspaper photographer, unbeknown to some of those present, Maxine included. The subsequent report in a local newspaper published recognisable photographs of her and she was thus "outed" as a witch without her permission. Maxine's unconventional spiritual path led to strife with her mother, who she was reconciled with close before her death. Soon after Maxine's mother's death members of her mother's neighborhood chased Maxine, throwing stones, and the windows of the house which had been her mother's were smashed.

Maxine and Alex were handfasted at Alderley Edge in 1965 and continued to initiate new witches in Manchester. In 1967, they moved to London where they lived and practised witchcraft in a basement flat in Notting Hill Gate, attracting much publicity and initiating many would-be priests and priestesses. At Beltane 1968, the couple married in a civil ceremony in Kensington London. Alex and Maxine had two children: Maya, born in 1967, and Victor, born in 1972.

Over the next few years until 1972, Maxine and Alex trained and initiated new members of their coven, initially within a framework consistent with older traditions but subsequently incorporating more of the couple's own unique characteristics, preferences, and innovations. In 1971, Stewart Farrar, recently initiated by Maxine, gave their brand of witchcraft the new name of "Alexandrian", partly honouring its leaders and also referencing the greatest city of the Hellenistic world and the library of magical texts which it housed, the library of Alexandria.

In 1971, Alex and Maxine had acquired a second home outside of London in the village of Selmeston, Sussex. There Maxine became a "fanatical gardener" while she and Alex set up a second coven and started to train people locally. Maxine, however, became concerned that the standards and expectations of training were not so high as they once had been in London, and that there was an awkward atmosphere. The couple found the cost of running two homes was too much, and they returned to London in 1972. Maxine declared that she no longer wanted to bear the responsibilities that came with the title "Witch Queen" and ritually destroyed the ritual robes and other items she had acquired. Shortly thereafter, Alex moved back to Sussex, and Maxine remained in London with their children.

== Alexandrian Witchcraft ==
From early 1970 onwards, both Alex and Maxine gained media attention due to their openness about practising witchcraft, appearing in a number of films, such as Legend of the Witches (1970), Witchcraft '70 (1970), Secret Rites (1971), and numerous documentaries.

After Maxine and Alex separated, Maxine remained in their London flat where she ran her own coven, "The Temple of the Mother", continuing to initiate and train people in Alexandrian Witchcraft. Members of the Temple of the Mother also trained in the art of healing and became well respected for it and other charitable works in the community.

Maxine remained in close contact with Alex until his death in 1988 and shortly before his death, he named Maxine as his next of kin.

In 2000, Maxine moved to Snowdonia, Wales, until 2010, when she returned to Abbey Road, London. Today, Maxine teaches Witchcraft and ritual in The Abbey Road Coven in London. She continues to travel, giving talks to those interested in witchcraft.

== See also ==
- Alexandrian Wicca
- Alex Sanders

== In popular culture ==
In 2023 the band Green Lung released a song called Maxine Witch Queen
