= Tarsh =

Engraved block used for printing in Arabic

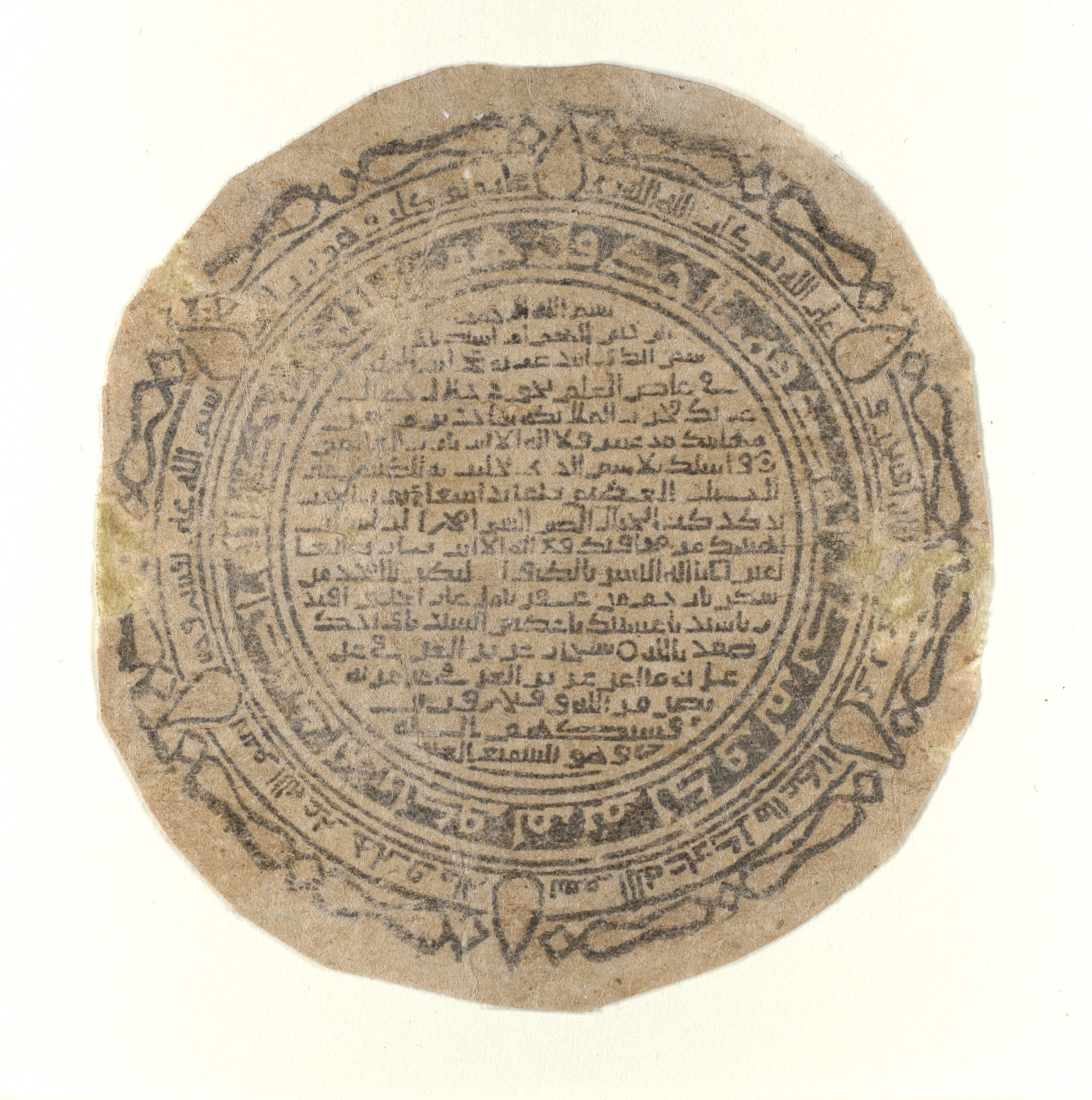
Circular Leaf, 11th century. One of the most extensively decorated printed amulets; the characters of which ranging from 0.1 to 0.2 cm in height - an astonishing technical achievement.

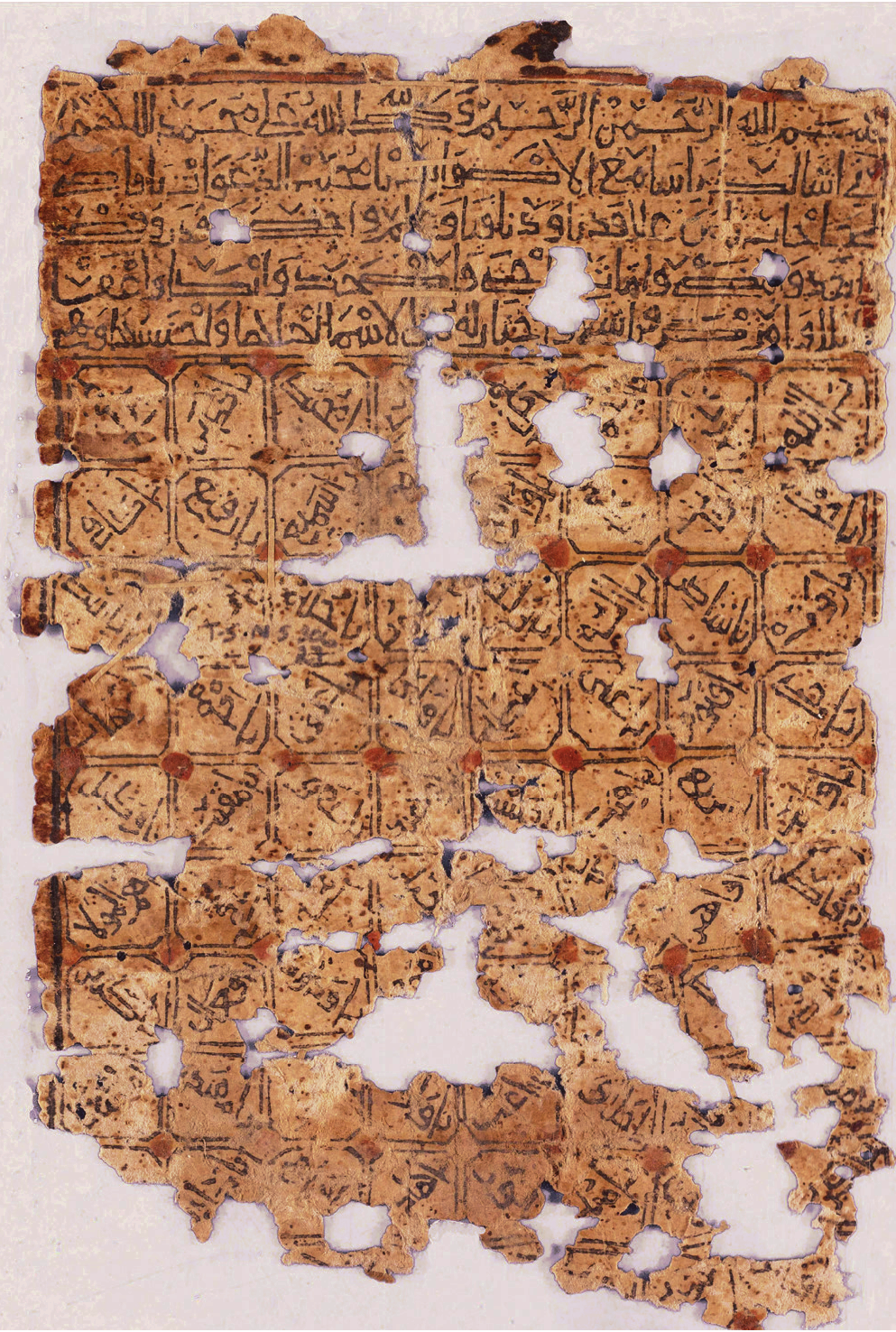
A printed 80 cell grid of the "Beautiful Names" of Allah

In post-classical Arabic, a ṭarsh (طرش) is an engraved block used for printing. They were made of wood or tin and were in use from around 900 to 1436/1444. There are over a hundred known Arabic blockprints on paper, parchment and possibly papyrus. They are mostly small strips intended for use in amulets. They have mainly been identified in public and private collections, but a few prints have been recovered archaeologically at Fusṭāṭ in Egypt. No physical specimen of a ṭarsh (wooden print block or metal matrix) itself has yet been found.

== Etymology and origin ==
The origin of ṭarsh, whether borrowed along with paper from China or invented independently in the Islamic world, is disputed. Richard Bulliet, contrasting the rapid adoption of paper and the marginalization of printing in the Islamic world, suggests a separate origin for each and thus the indigenous development of ṭarsh.

Though the use of alternating black and red ink in some printed talismans recalls Chinese red seals on black prints. Similarly, the unusually undulating Basmala calligraphy in TIEM inv. no. 44/14 reflects the distinct visual character of Chinese seal script.

The origin of the word ṭarsh is uncertain. The Semitic root ṭ-r-š (طرش) is related to deafness and ṭ-r-s (طرس) to writing (including the word for palimpsest), but an Egyptian origin has also been suggested. In Aramaic, a language which the Banū Sāsān language of Sīn drew much from, the triliteral root ṭ-r-sh means "to beat" or "to batter." Richardson argues this refers to the production method itself: the physical action of striking an inked stamp or matrix onto a printing support to produce an impression. In the modern surviving descendant of the Banu Sasan Sīn language, the Sīm of Nile Ḥalab smiths, the related word mutrash refers to a type of anvil, further reinforcing the connection to metalworking and striking.

== Social context ==
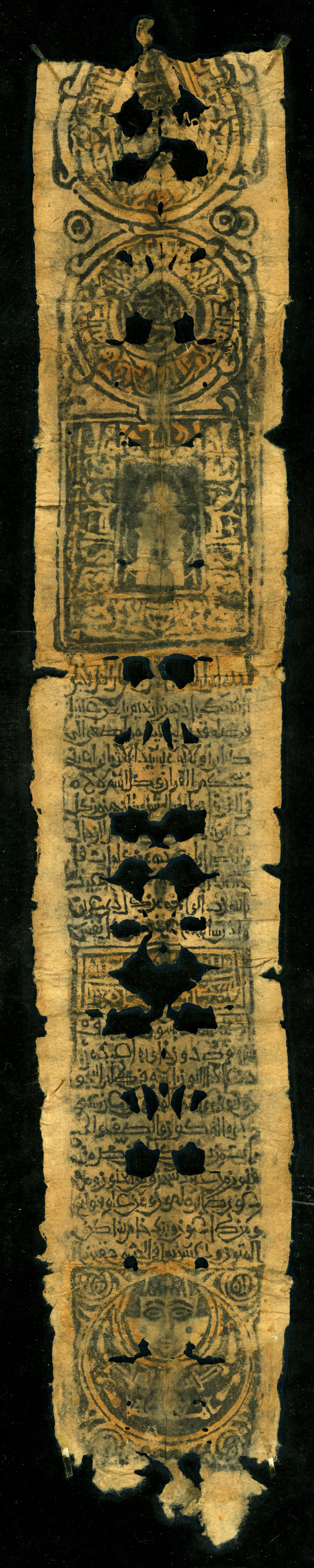
A printed depiction of a head at the bottom of a talisman, similar to Fatimid manuscript illustrations.

For the most part, printing was not a state-sponsored activity but a "minority enterprise" practiced by a confederation of social outcasts known as the Banū Sāsān, since printed artifacts are only mentioned in connection to them, and the entire vocabulary of blockprinting is in their tribal dialect of Sīn not any other middle eastern languages. (Haykal: large amulet scroll, Sharīḥa: small amulet, Sirmāṭ: block-printed amulet, sarmaṭa: to print, ṭarsh: printing block, ṭarāsh: printer).

Their name is in reference to a certain Shaykh Sasan, who some medieval authors thought to be the son of Kay Bahman, by asserting and taking pride in these royal origins they sought to elevate their social standing. In the 13th century, they acknowledged their estrangement and renamed themselves the ghurabā’ ("Strangers"). This name is the origin of the Gurbeti Romani subgroup across the Balkans and Turkey, as well as the Ghorbati who range from Syria through Iran and Afghanistan to South and Central Asia.

They were made up of various ethnic and religious groups, such as Zutt, Persians, Nubians, Jews and Aramaic speakers, and were predominantly of a Shi'i inclination. They fulfilled many economic niches as: animal trainers, public performers (astrologers, magicians, acrobats, sword swallowers), medical workers (ophthalmologists, drug dealers, pharmacists, female genital cutters), beggars, night watchmen, and makers and sellers of printed amulets. But most important was their connection to the occult sciences such as alchemy, divination and particularly astrology. To such an extent, that the term for these sciences in Arabic and persian ('ulūm gharība/'ulūm-i gharībe) seems to be drawn from their name ghurabā’. They also developed the illuminated Shi'i astrological book genre known as a Bulhān.

To sell as many amulets as possible, ghurabā’ astrologers mass produced them through block printing, deceiving the illiterate masses into thinking they were individually made and handwritten. To maintain the charade, they required strict secrecy regarding the printing process. This culture of guarded secrecy is a likely a major reason why printing was not adopted for mainstream book production in the Islamic world, despite the technology being well-established for half a millennium.

== Historical development ==
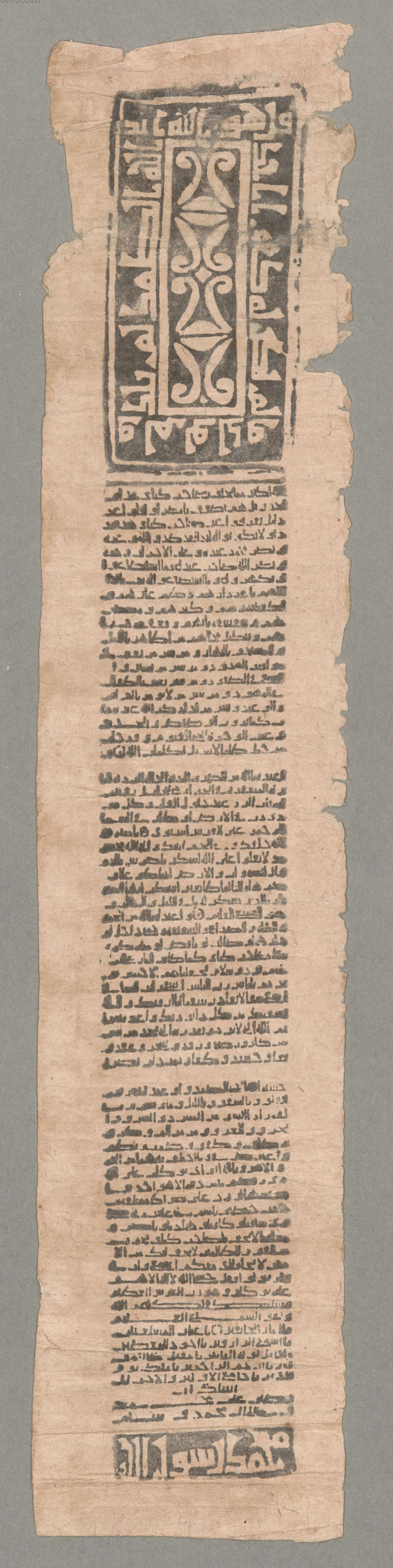
This amulet's more blurred lines suggests it was later, and that the block print had worn down.

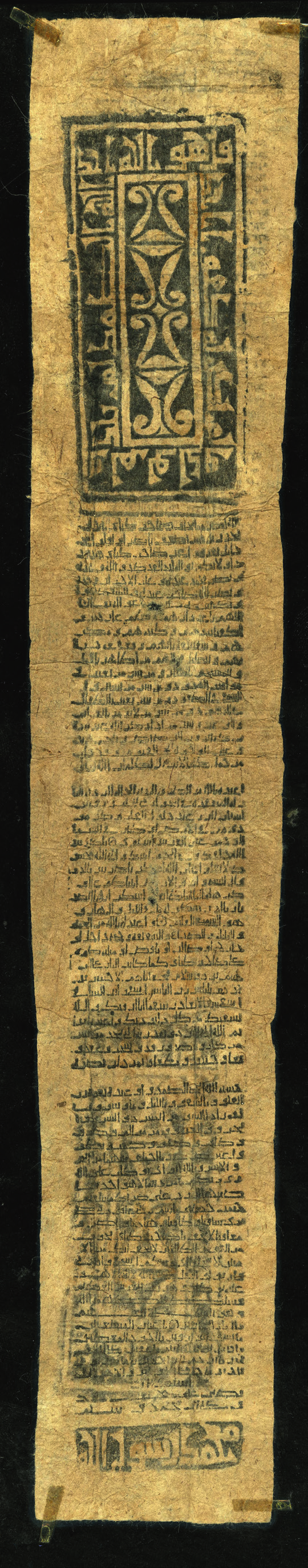
This print was folded before the ink dried, leaving a mirror image on the bottom. Its crisper lines suggest it was the earlier print.

Among the earliest Arabic blockprints with Kufic script, and rare evidence of print block degradation between prints.

Between the 10th and 14th centuries, several texts contain passages which could refer to block printing. Perhaps the earliest of these is Ibn al-Nadim's Fihrist of the late 10th century, where he mentions Egyptian magicians who use stamps. Around the same time, the poet and traveller Abu Dulaf al-Khazraji (fl. ca. 952) composed for Buyid vizier Sahib ibn Abbad a panegyric about the Banū Sāsān, an informal guild of beggars, thieves, and confidence tricksters. Mentioning their use of the ṭarsh to produce amulets:

The engraver of ṭarsh is he who engraves moulds for amulets. People who are illiterate and cannot write buy them from him. The seller keeps back the design which is on it so that he exhausts his supply of amulets on the common people and makes them believe that he wrote them. The mould is called the ṭarsh.

These amulets were believed to possess white magic providing protection or divine assistance and blessings. Most amulets are long, narrow rectangular strips, similar in size to a bookmark, though a few can reach over a meter long.

These were to be folded or rolled up and placed in metal cylinders that were worn around the neck, (Note: Aga Khan Museum, AKM 508) though some were dissolved in water and ingested carrying its magical power throughout the body. They typically had numerous recurrent elements: address to God (such as the Basmala or Takbir), statement of purpose (I seek refuge from followed by a list of afflictions), identification of the beneficiary (due to being blockprinted this was generic: owner of this amulet; whoever wears this), invocations to God. A few have a closing formula (such as blessings upon the prophet) but most end abruptly.

To be considered efficacious, amulets required specific religious components: Qurʾānic citations (especially the "disjoined letters" (Muqattaʿat), Surahs Al-Fatiha and Al-Ikhlas, the 18th verse of Al Imran and verses from Al-Isra') lists of some or all of the 99 names of God, invocations, numerological elements, and geometric forms like circles, teardrops, hexagrams and Octagrams, some may also include Magic Squares.

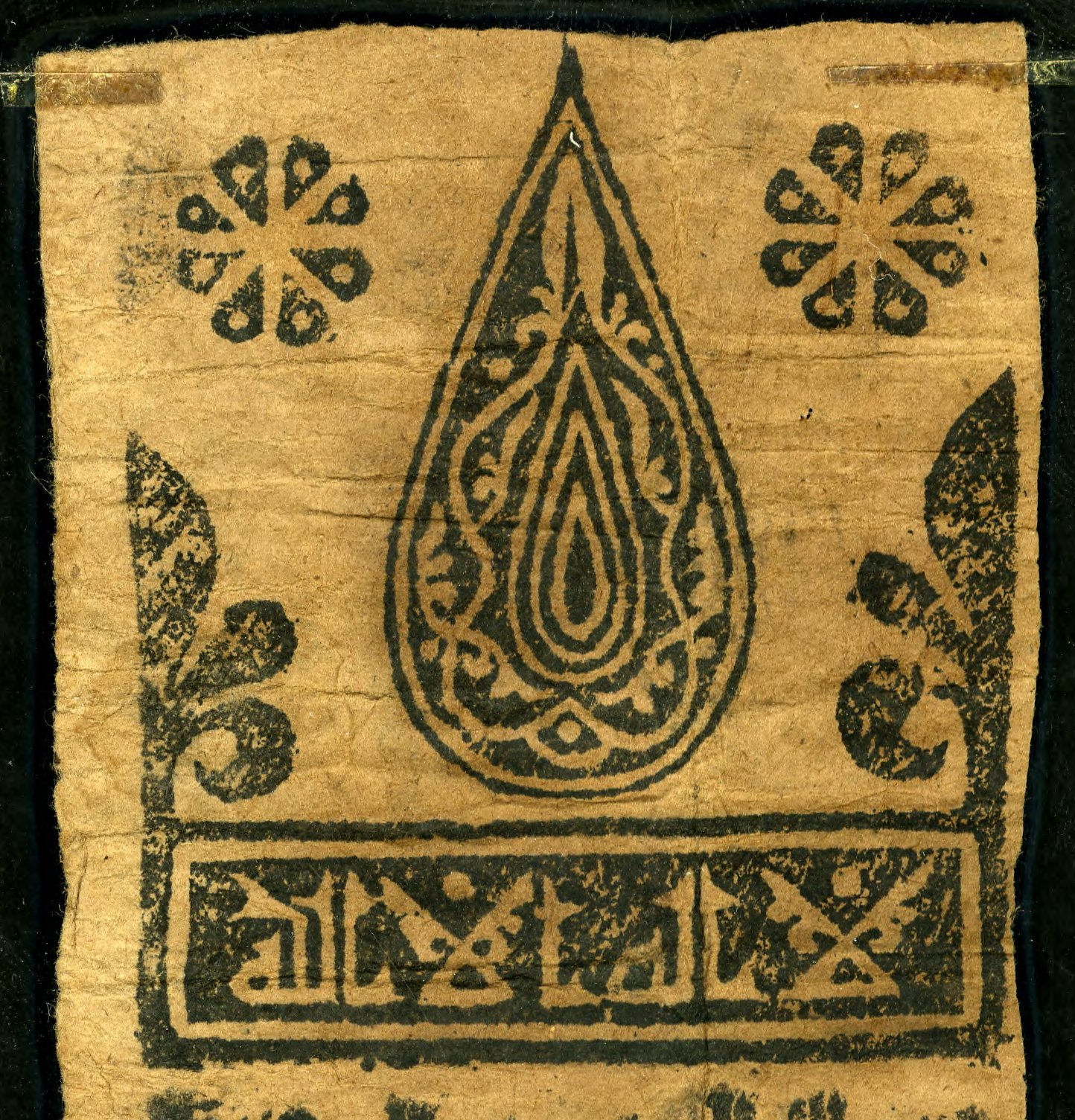
Teardrop and other decirative motifs at the head of an amulet.

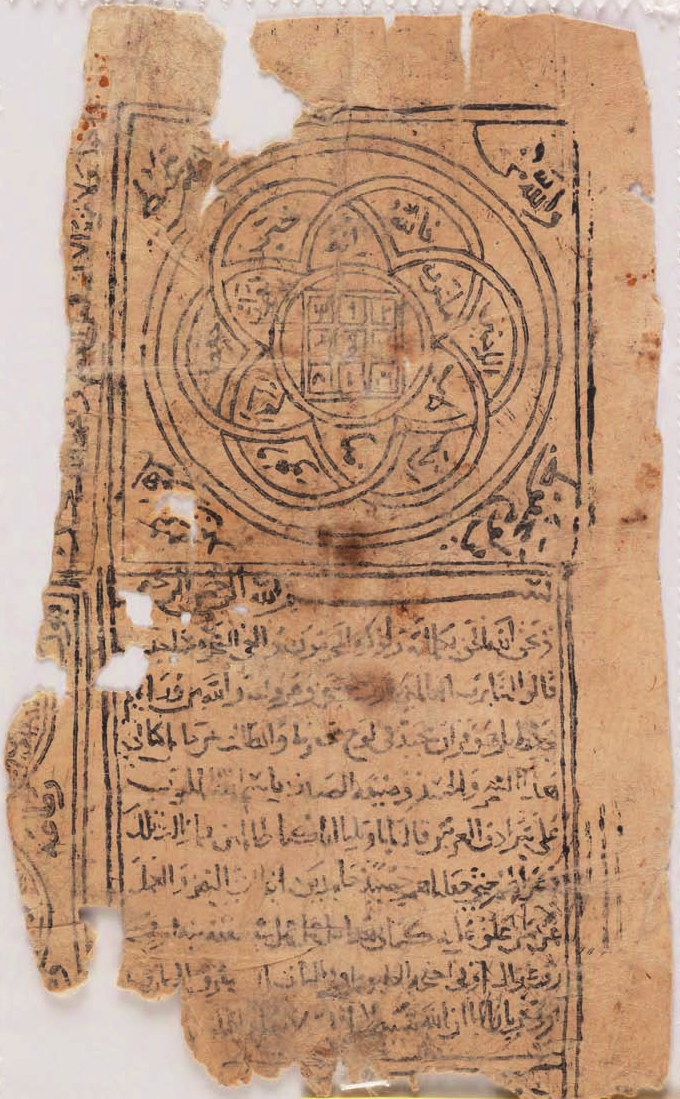
A double interlocking trefoil, framing a magic square.

Block printed amulets exhibit skillful craftsmanship, refined artistry and an aesthetic which far eclipses handmade amulets that were mostly bereft of ornamention. These extensive highly detailed and elaborate decorative elements would've been very labor intensive to carve and mark a major difference between handwritten and blockprinted amulets. This attempt to increase the visual appeal of the item, points to a sophisticated and cultured consumer.

The decoration could be printed using a separate block, and the text could also be printed with multiple blocks, combining different fonts. typically Kufic in early specimens, later in Naskh and rarely Maghrebi script. This was often undotted, which was likely thought to be more potent. Not only was decoration and scripts printed using separate blocks, but the different thematic sections of the text could also be printed with individual blocks. Suggesting a modular system; printers assembling a custom sequence of texts tailored to the patron's needs. Though others were static and generic, printed entirely (text and decoration) from a single block.

Two centuries later around 1232-1248 al-Jawbari, a member of the Banu Sasan himself, writes in his Kitāb al-mukhtār fī kashf al-asrār, commissioned by Rukn al-Din Mawdud, about the daily printing of amulets:

among the revelation of secrets that they [the astrologers] utter concerning the amulet (sarmāṭ) is that they have matrices (maʿārīḍ) that are called ṭurūsh. These are stamps (qawālib), with which one can print amulets (fa-yaṭbaʿ sarāmīṭ) every day - God willing.

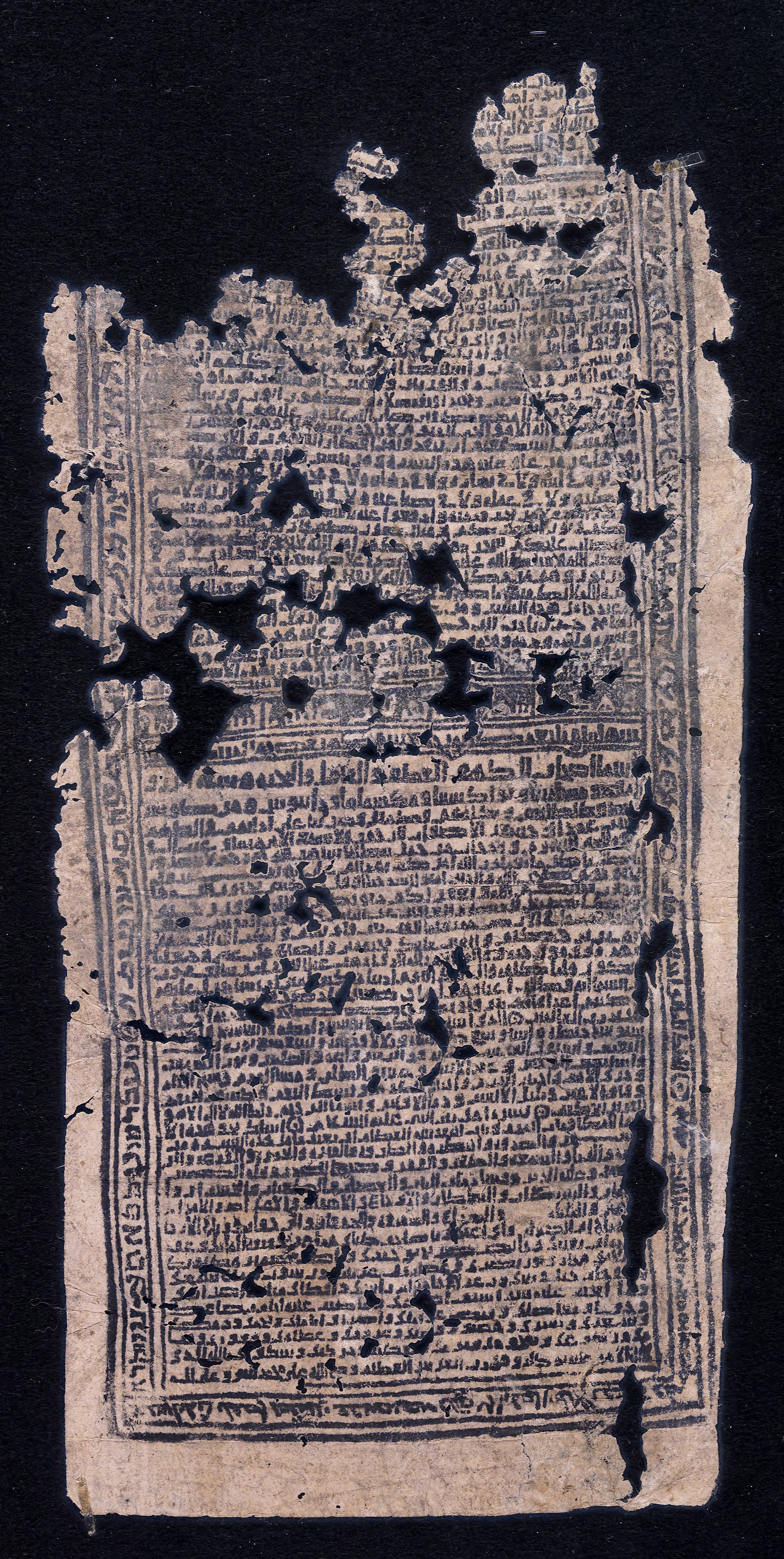

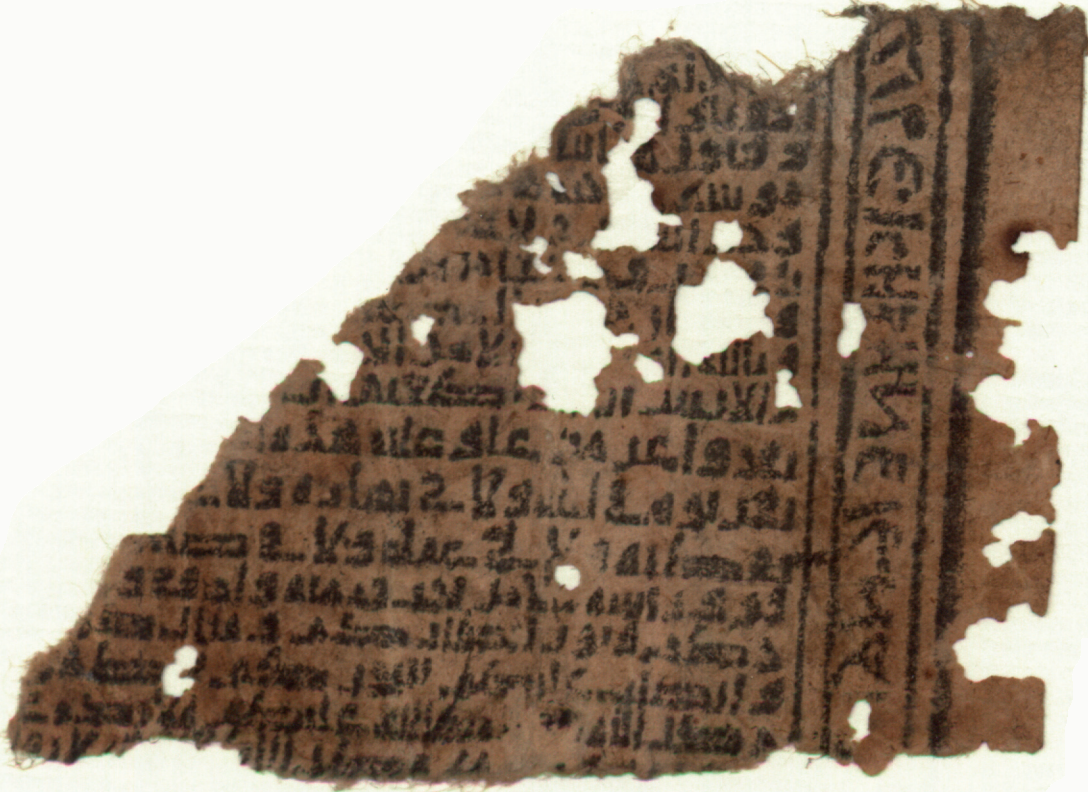
A fragmented copy, made using the same print block, in which only the Coptic border of the top right is visible.

Quadrilingual amulets about the Seven Sleepers. The main body in Arabic, with Hebrew, Syriac and Coptic on the borders. Also contains a quote of Surah At-Tawbah:129; 13th Century

Suggesting mass production and that the printing process had become quite efficient. Many prints would be made on a single large piece of paper, and then cut up into the individual amulets. There exist 8 sets of amulet multiples, (Note: University of Utah A1563r76 and Bayerische Staatsbibliothek München A.or. 88.2023.; Aga Khan Museum AKM508, Andalusian specimen TP1-2, and a specimen in the possession of a private collector in California. All three inside lead amulet cases.; Columbia University Library Papyrus 705b80 and Indiana University, Bloomington, Lilly Library, Misc. mss. Atiyah Gift no. 9.; Michaelides E29 and E30;Document 43 excavated in Fustat among documents dated between 344/955 and 487/1094.; Österreichische Nationalbibliothek (Vienna) P. Vindob. A. Ch. 12.14284 and private collection of Richard Ettinghausen (ca. ninth or tenth century).; Österreichische Nationalbibliothek (Vienna) P. Vindob. A. Ch. 12.14686 and Dār al-kutub al-miṣriyya (Cairo) inv. no. 313.; Österreichische Nationalbibliothek (Vienna) P.Vindob. A. Ch. 12.14588 and University of Utah A1561 (c. twelfth or thirteenth century).; Österreichische Nationalbibliothek (Vienna) P.Vindob. A. Ch. 12.141 and University of Utah A1562.90) and some of the differences between copies made using the same print block show how the wooden tarsh degraded and wore down over time. Beyond that, there is least one example of a Qurʾānic print that looks like it could have been a page from a book.

Muḥammad Ibn Dāniyāl (1248-1311) uses ghuraba' amulet makers as characters in his shadow plays, in one such monologue he mentions how they would alter their craft depending on their clientele such as using Greek for a Christian audience or Hebrew for a Jewish one. Thus the ghuraba tailored the imagery, motifs and wording of amulets in accordance to local tastes and appetites, thereby maximizing their customer pool to sell as many amulets as possible. In one case, (Note: A.Ch. 12.145)Arabic was even transliterated using Coptic letters, this may have been to impress illiterate people with their magical power rather than to be read.

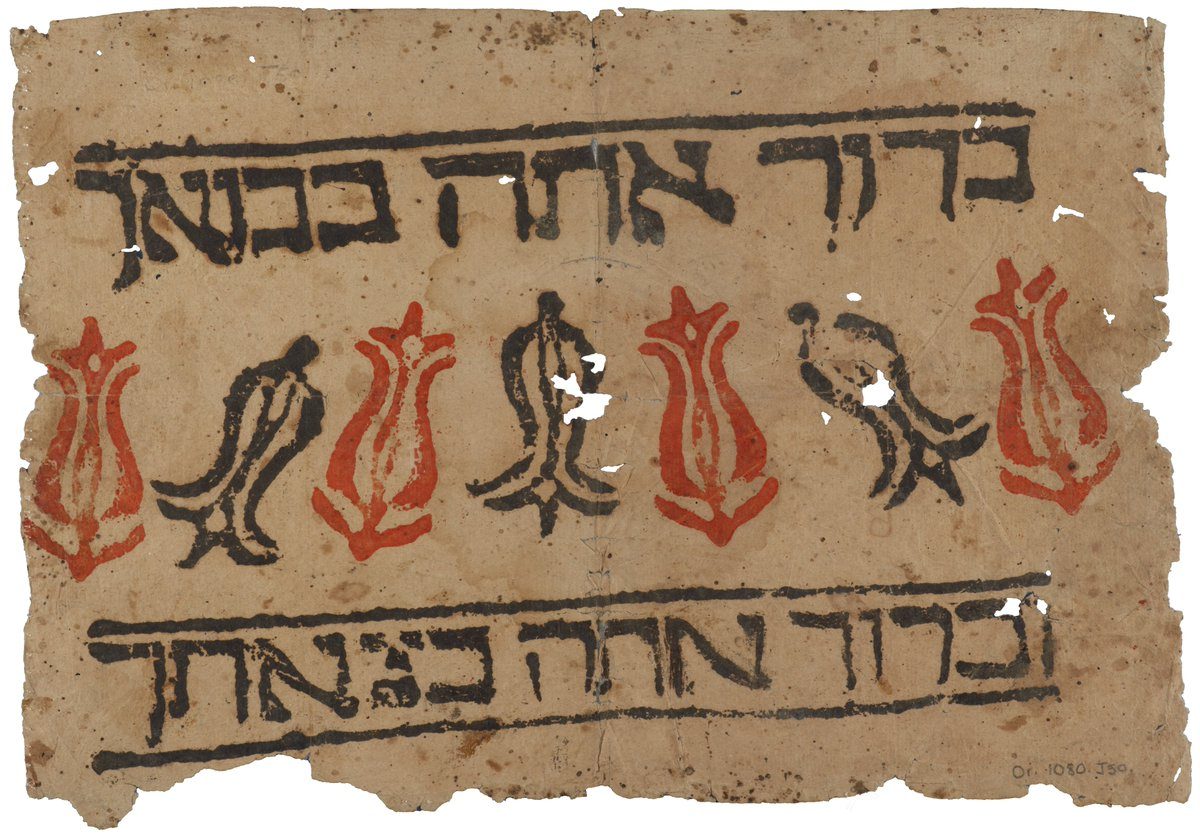
A unique Hebrew block print from the Cairo Geniza; Quoting Deuteronomy 28:6, likely intended to be hung on a doorway or a welcome placard. Late 1300s

Ibn Dāniyāl also has a passage on some of the specific purposes of the amulets:

And this is a piece against the evil eye, fever and inflammations of the skin (erysipelas); this one is to tie the tongue of an opponent, and that one is an invocation against the evil spirits that befall children; this piece is to liberate a prisoner, and to cure a madman; that piece is to set free the one tied by magic, and to cure the depressed; this is a piece to attain status and to be received favourably, to avert being bound in chains, and for riding horses...

Block printing wasn't restricted to the Mashriq, and since at least the tenth century the technology had reached al-Andalus, representing the earliest known blockprinting on European soil.

=== Governmental and Administrative Uses ===
Blockprinting wasn't just limited to the minority enterprise of talisman makers, rather it was used by imperial administrations. The Fatimid state chancery used printed stamps of "al-Imam al-Hakim" - most probably Caliph al-Hakim bi-Amr Allah (996-1021) - to mark tax receipts. Because of this specific reference, the receipt is one of the very few blockprints with an externally verifiable date.

In the west, Ibn al-Abbar (1199-1260) secretary to the Hafsids, details how the Almohad administration printed state decrees for provincial distribution:

He [Badr ibn Ahmed al-Khassi] was a slave of the Emir Abd Allah who manumitted him and put him in charge of the royal lands. Then al-Nasir (1199-1213) appointed him to the vizierate, the office of gatekeeper, the leadership, the horses and the posts. He was without equal in the provinces. The official edicts were written in his house. Then he sent them to be printed (lil-ṭab'). Once they were printed they were returned to him and he sent them to the governors who executed them by his authority.

State-directed printing is also recorded in the east; Under Gaykhatu (1291-1295), the Ilkhanate introduced paper money (Jiaochao) in July 1284, outlawing metal coinage, in hopes of alleviating the state's financial straits. This paper currency was printed as mentioned by Rashid al-Din. Printing the value of the denomination in the centre, with decorative Chinese characters on the border and, in red ink, the imperial seal. Though shortly after the government rescinded its policy in wake of resistance by merchants and the general populace, leaving no surviving examples.

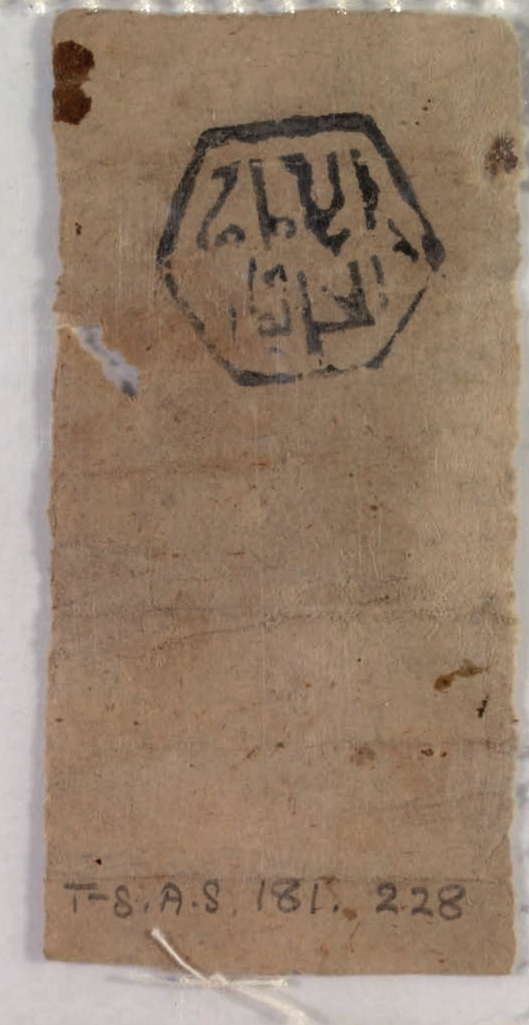
Stamp of "al-Imam al-Hakim" on the reverse of a Fatimid tax receipt; 996-1021

A commercial stamp stating: "Stamp of the Almería Qaysarīya (warehouse), Year 750 (1349-1350 CE)"

Printing was also employed to regulate commerce and document property. One such commercial artifact is a printing block from the Emirate of Granada bearing the name of the qaysarīya (a type of commercial warehouse or exchange) of the prosperous port city Almería, as well as mentioning the date 750 (1349–1350 CE). This stamp seems to have been used to indicate property ownership or potentially as proof that required taxes had been assessed on goods entering the city.

=== Pilgrimage (Hajj) Certificates ===
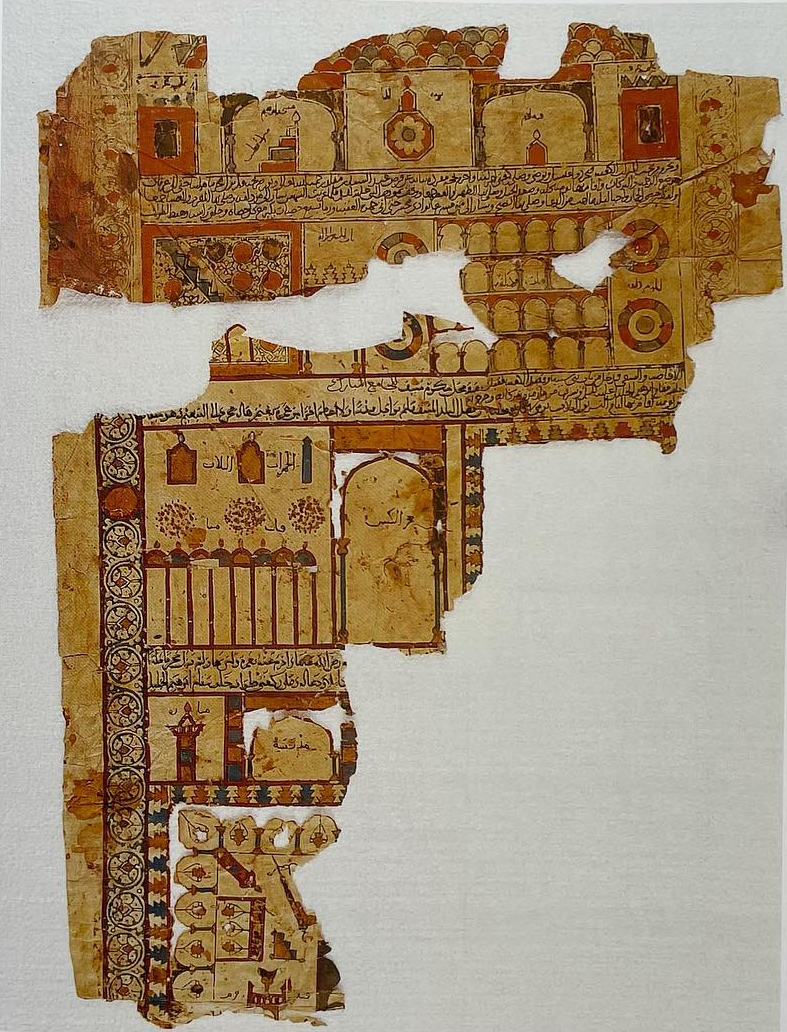
Fragments of 3 identical hajj certificates from 1239-1242. Its larger images were too large to be printed with a single block, and so were split into 2 or more blocks.

Another use of the Tarsh was in printing Hajj certificates, a cache of which was found at the Umayyad mosque in 1893, now housed in the Turkish and Islamic Arts Museum. Within the broader 1084–1310 corpus, printed examples appeared between 1210 and 1250 to accommodate the rising popularity of illustrated certificates. Some of these can be dated more precisely due to the depiction of the Caliph's name on the banners of Mount Arafat, with several mentioning Caliph al-Nasir (1180-1225) and one mentioning Caliph al-Musta'sim (1242-1258).

The majority of the certificates are examples of Hajj substitution (where a person does Hajj on behalf of a 3rd party), some of which were for the most elite figures of 11th-13th century Syria, including the Ayyubid Sultans themselves.

While printed and handmade certificates initially coexisted, printed versions became the exclusive standard by the second quarter of the 13th century. However, during the early Mamluk period, these printed documents declined in both quantity and quality before disappearing entirely.

Wood and metal block printing was used in all aspects of the certificate. Including textual elements (calligraphic Basmala and other major inscriptions); decorative elements (interlinear ornamented panels and the 3-sided border - omitting the footer since the border block was used in multiple certificates of varying size leading to misalignments that made a bottom border impractical); the illustrations of the hajj rites and sacred sites and sometimes for stand-alone designs. The use of print resulted in higher quality illustrations, as well as a more harmonious and symmetrical overall design. The discrepancy between fine engraving and coarse hand-painting suggests a segmented labour process. Accomplished engravers, experienced printers, and hurried painters likely collaborated across different workshops, resulting in inconsistent artistic quality.

The production of large illustrations (50 cm+) for publicly displayed certificates necessitated splitting images across several printing blocks. Technical difficulties in aligning these blocks meant that inexperienced printers often had to manually draw sections to finish the image.

Some of these certificates may have been printed by the ghuraba, who were known to have travelled in pilgrimage caravans. Due to the international scope of the Hajj, these printed certificates likely circulated to the furthest reaches of the Islamic world, from Indonesia to West Africa.

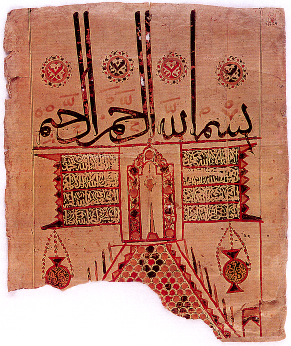
Fragment of a large certificate, (over 210x50cm) mentioning al-Musta'sim (1242-1258) as ruling Caliph

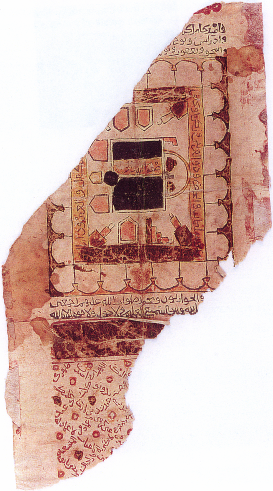
One of the earliest depictions of the Ka'ba ever.

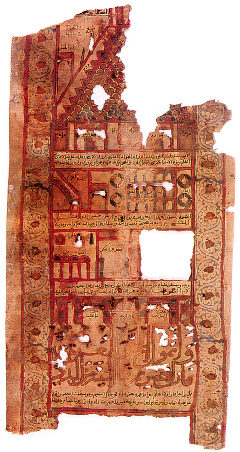
A small certificate (130-140x24cm)

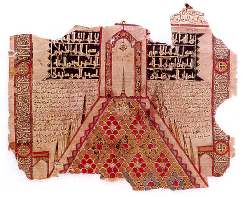
1220, Showing Arafat. Another fragment from an identical certificate shows Jerusalem. Likely a fragments of one of the largest certificates (210x50cm)

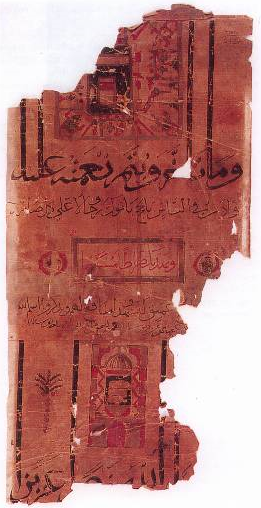
1291, one of the last printed certificates. Mamluk certificates of lower quality, detail, and coherence than Ayyubid predecessors; Printed certificates ceased shortly after.

=== Disappearance ===
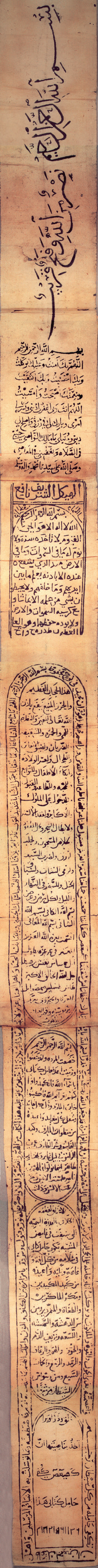
The terminus ad quem of Arabic block printing, featuring an Italian watermark dating to 1436-1444. The longest amulet at 124.6cm.

The last extant example of a blockprinted talisman is dated with some certainty, is the very large and elaborate Gutenberg-Museum, GM 03.1 Schr. At over 1.2m long and 7.4 cm wide, it is among the largest block prints, it's also one of the very few to survive wholly intact, it further contains an uncommon quotation of an entire verse of the Quran (Ayat Al-Kursi), as well as use of numerals and the upper quarter contains a large handwritten calligraphic Basmala. Most important is Italian watermark on the uppermost strip allowing precise dating (though the exact date depends on the paper's place of manufacture: 1436–1437 if from Venice, 1437–1438 from Palermo, or 1444 from Fabriano).

Thus, the production of these final blockprints likely overlapped with the emergence of Gutenberg’s printing press in the 1440s. After this date blockprinting vanishes without explanation, though Muehlhaeusler posits it may have been due to economic competition: Bespoke handwritten amulets were likely more appealing than the more generic printed ones, and the labor intensive process of producing printed amulets was scarcely rewarded by the limited buying power of the Egyptian populace.

After its 15th century disappearance, Medieval Arabic block printing had been completely forgotten by the time Joseph von Hammer-Purgstall found textual evidence in 1852 or Joseph von Karabacek identified some prints in 1894.

== Metal matrices and inks ==
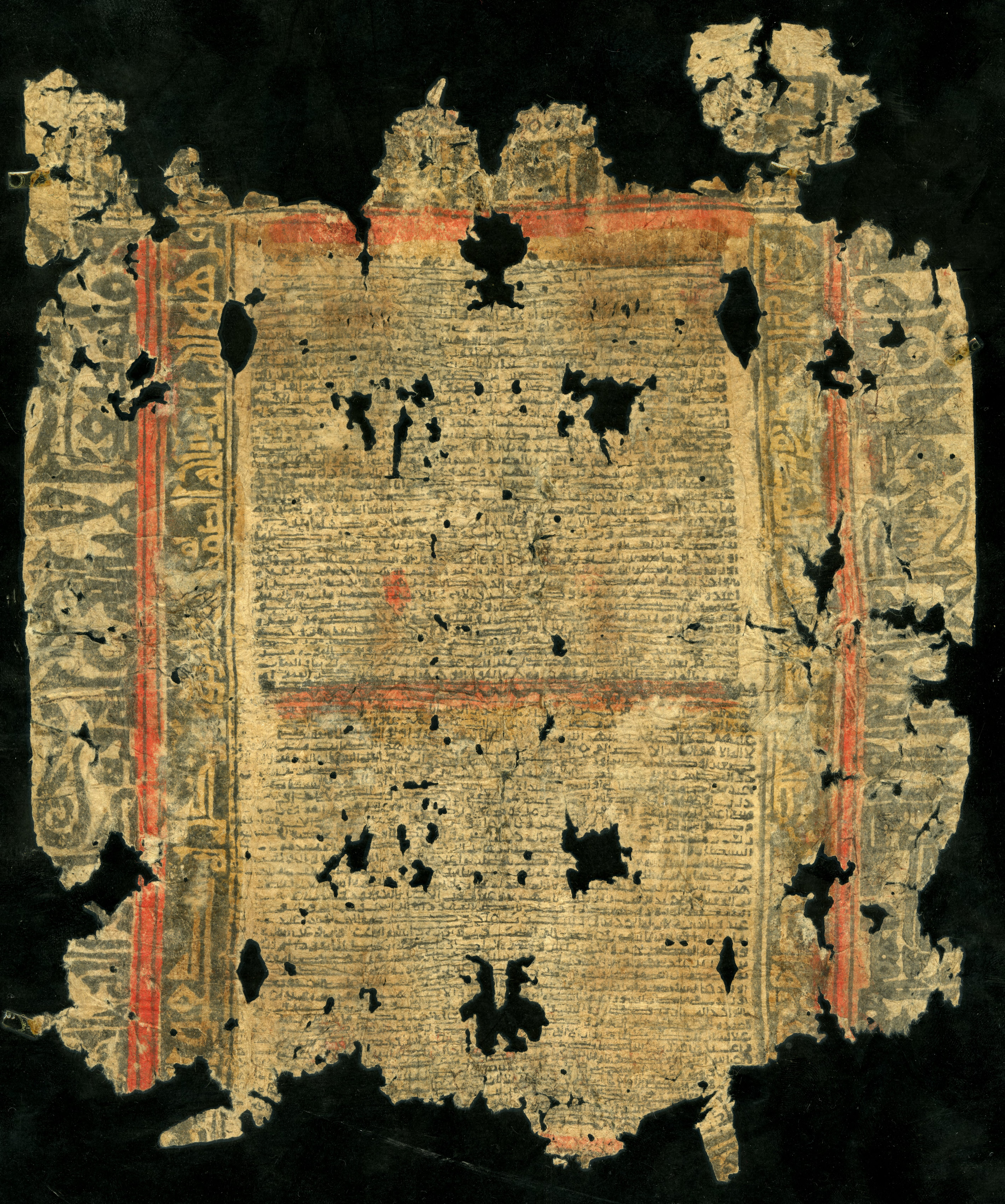
A talisman damaged while folding. With red border highlights. The outermost left border quotes Surah Hud:88. While the inner is Surah Ikhlas. A.Ch. 12.141 seems to be a small fragment copy of the same print.

=== Tin matrices ===
While early scholars assumed ṭarsh were exclusively woodblocks, there is evidence ṭarsh were at times made from tin or lead, most likely via carving. According to the Iraqi poet Ṣafī al-Dīn al-Ḥillī(1278-1349) mentions in his 75 verse Qaṣīda fī lughat al-ghurabāʾ wa-funūnihim wa-ḥiyalihim (a qaṣīda on the language of the ghurabāʾ, their arts, and their wiles):

"And in making moulds [ṭarsh] from tin for turning out amulets and charms, how often has my hand written on the mould in the script of Syriac and then that of phylactery-writing! (Hebrew)"

Richardson and Muehlhaeusler note that carving in tin was not as laborious as thought by Bulliet, and his suggestions of hammering into clay moulds or casting are improbable. Tin is a soft metal, and the skills required to engrave the intricate print matrix mirrored those of coin die engravers, who were capable of situating up to 150 words on a coin just 3 centimetres in diameter, such as Buyid engraver al-Ḥasan b. Muḥammad's (fl. 947-975) 1.5 mm tall signature. While archaeological evidence shows that a model made out of lead was the first step in producing a coin die, so lead may have also been utilized for the ṭarsh.

Die engravers only worked 3–12 weeks a year, the remainder of their time was probably spent in bazaars or court workshops, some were also itinerants. Richardson suggests that the die engravers likely cross-pollinated their tin engraving and modular letter punch techniques with the amulet printing trade of the ghuraba. Medieval authors similarly recognised the similarity to coin minting as stated by Rashid al-Din Hamadani.

==== Movable type ====
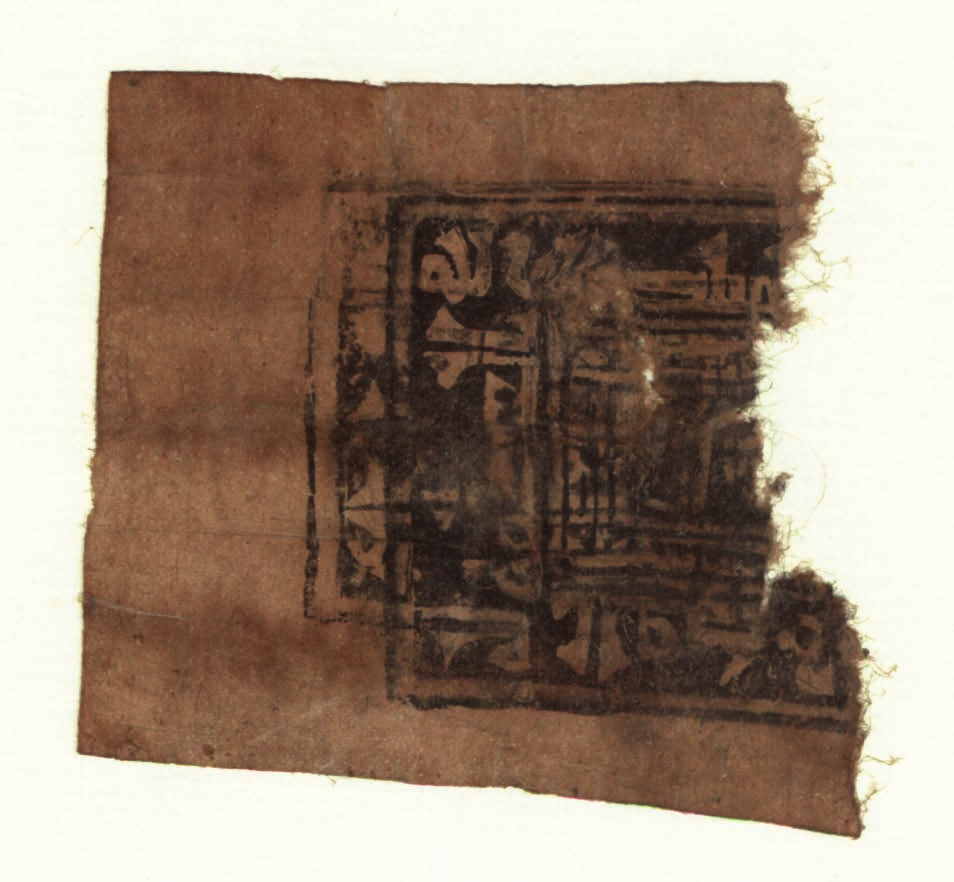
A unique double strike of 2 different block prints, with different texts and of different size

Richardson has noted the similarity between movable type and the modular logic of punches of 9th century Andalusi and 10th century Persian coinmaking. Instead of hand engraving every character into a metal die, they used steel punches to strike text into the die.

Elemental Punches: Engravers used small tools representing the building blocks of Arabic letters - individual strokes, curves, and ringlets. By combining these elemental shapes, an artisan could assemble different letters within the die. For example, a single ringlet punch was used for circular letters, while various rectilinear segments were struck together to form complex ligatures.

Long Punches: For common phrases, such as the mint date wa-mi’atayn (and two hundred), engravers created single punches for entire words or word groups. Physical evidence of this exists in coins where segments of the minting formula show rectilinear overlaps, such as that found by George C. Miles on Umayyad Spanish coins, proving they were struck as prefabricated blocks rather than carved as continuous script. Stefan Heidemann mentions similar regarding Ghaznavid and Seljuk coins of the 11th century, and how the use of prefabricated punches increased efficiency.

This mirrors the technique of Gutenberg's own earliest typeface, the Donatus Kalender, combining stokes, curves and other shapes to assemble a single letter, such that a hyphen was formed from 2 punches, and even simple letters could be assembled from 4-7 elements. The ghuraba might have learned of this technique from die engravers and used letter and word punches to create their printing blocks.

=== Acid Etching (Intaglio) ===
They may have also etched the text into the tin print plate, in a method similar to intaglio printing of 1430s Germany. At the beginning of the 15th century the Egyptian associate of al-Maqrizi and member of the Banu Sasan, Muhammad ibn Abi Bakr al-Zarkhuri, wrote Kitab zahr al-basatin on various tricks of the Banu Sasan. In his 8th chapter, he details how to use acid to etch words into stone and metal:

Description of a flowing ink with which you can write on stone: Take the stone and write whatever you want on it with wax and soak it in the watery solution. Take potassium nitrate, ammonia, and wine vinegar. If you want the writing to be engraved, coat the background surface with the wax, but if you want the background surface to be engraved, then coat the writing with the wax. Leave it in the abovementioned solution for three days. So understand this. Description of another ink that writes on tin bronze: And this (tin bronze) becomes white like inlay, when it [the ink] is wiped away. The way of making it is to write on the tin with alkali and lime dissolved in water. So understand this.

=== Inks ===
While black ink predominated, a range of colourful inks were used: Red: Derived from cinnabar and safflower. Yellow: Derived from saffron. Green: Derived from verdigris. With the latter being especially rare. (Note: Copenhagen, The David Collection, acc. no. 85/2003, 86.6 × 4.5 cm.)

Metal matrices require different types of ink, although no sources explicitly mention other types of ink used by the ghuraba, they may have followed a similar practice as described by Ibn al-Jazari to produce iron-gall inks (hibr) - combining gallnuts, gum Arabic and vitriol to make a black ink - and his detailed instructions in making coloured metallic inks (liqa) ranging from red and green to gold and silver. These inks would have been able to adhere to the tin matrix, and are similar to the inks of the Gutenberg bible.

Prints with coloured ink:

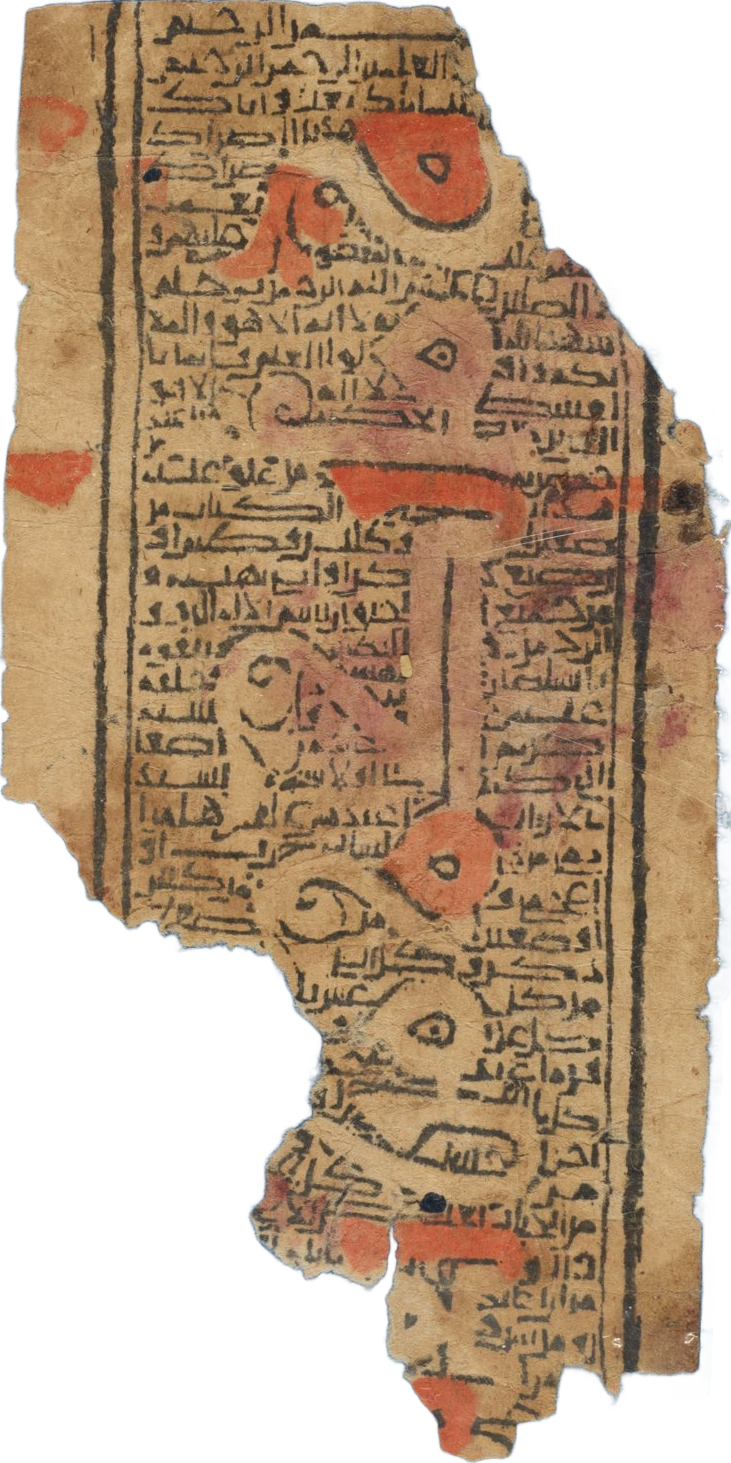
Longitudinal Kufic in red ink - its outline consists of parts of the letters of the horizontal Naskh text. "A very sophisticated approach to block printing text."

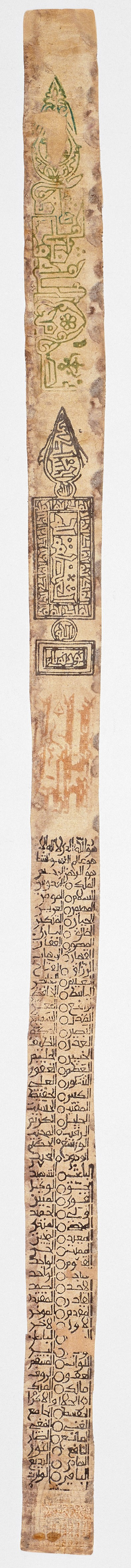
A rare use of Green ink

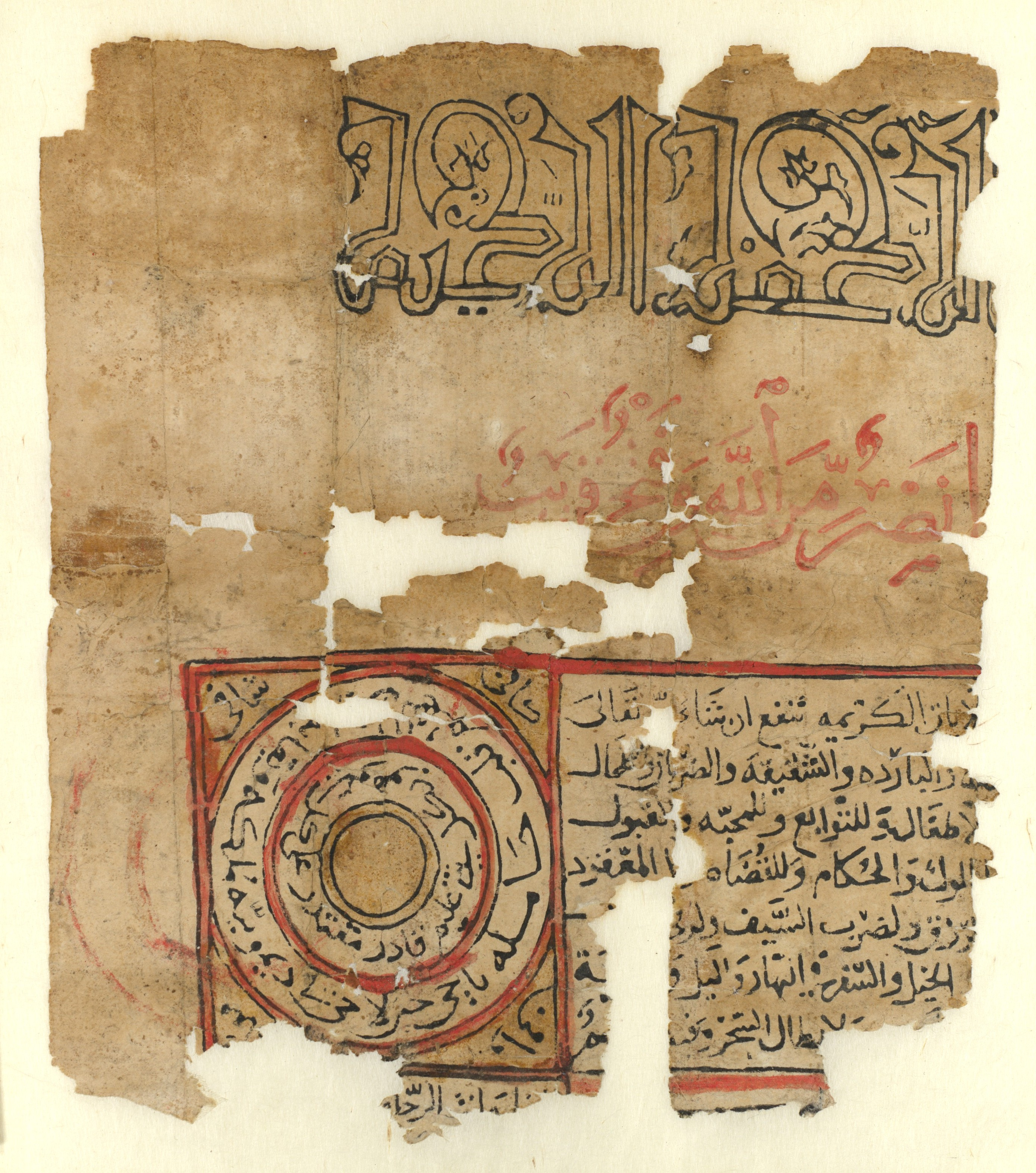
Red ink in the margins is likely printed. 11th–12th century

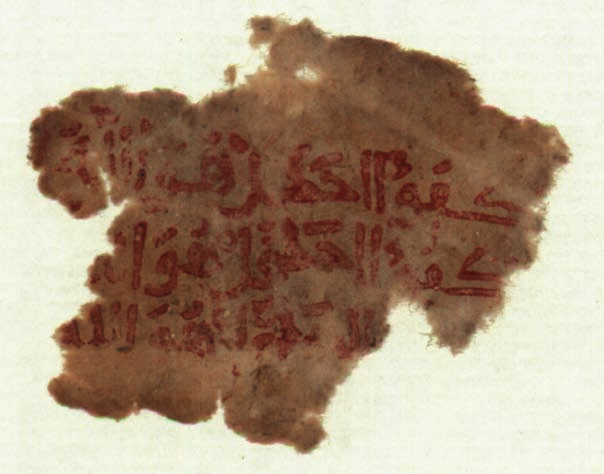
A print entirely in red ink

== Transmission to the West ==
In the beginning of the 15th century there are reports of the migration of organized bands of "Egyptians" or "Secani" into Latin Christendom. This is clearly reported in the imperial registers of Sigismund, Holy Roman Emperor: On March 13, 1417, while Sigismund was at the Council of Constance, two petitioners sought his assistance. Both were presented as male Christian converts from Islam, originating from the Islamic East.

Firstly Duke Michael of Egypt, who received a letter of safe passage allowing him and his band unrestricted travel through Sigismund's realms - this letter would be used over a century later in Eberbach, as described by Sebastian Münster in his 1544 Cosmographia. Second was Count Bartholomew of Bethsaida: A high-ranking former Muslim, who'd only arrived in Europe recently. Described as a former manual laborer who could no longer work. he had previously obtained similar recommendation letters from King Wenceslaus of Bohemia and Archbishop Conrad of Prague on October 25, 1416. To support him, the kings and archbishops commanded the entire Christian community to support them, with Archbishop Conrad offering a 40-day indulgence to those who aided him.

The sudden emergence of single-page devotional woodcuts in Bavaria and Bohemia (c.1410-1420) coincides exactly with these migrations. Beyond that, the earliest European woodcuts share distinct aesthetic and technical hallmarks with the Tarsh. Both traditions focused entirely on religious iconography and produced undated, anonymous works without workshop identifiers. They were single-sided prints and utilized a specific colour scheme of red, brown, yellow, and green to decorate the images and borders.

It is proposed that Gharīb craftspeople who had been printing religious texts in Islamic lands for centuries sold these prints or shared their carving techniques with Bavarian and Bohemian monasteries, spreading printing technology to Europe.

== Gallery ==
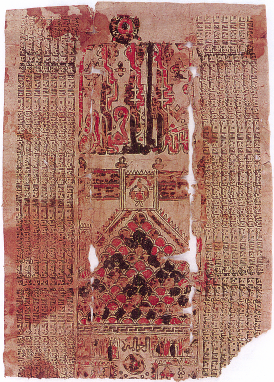
Printed hajj certificate, the strangely undulating letters of the Basmala is similar to Chinese Seals (13th century)

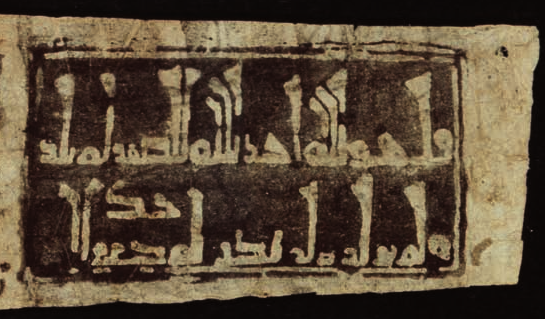
Surah Ikhlas in reserve

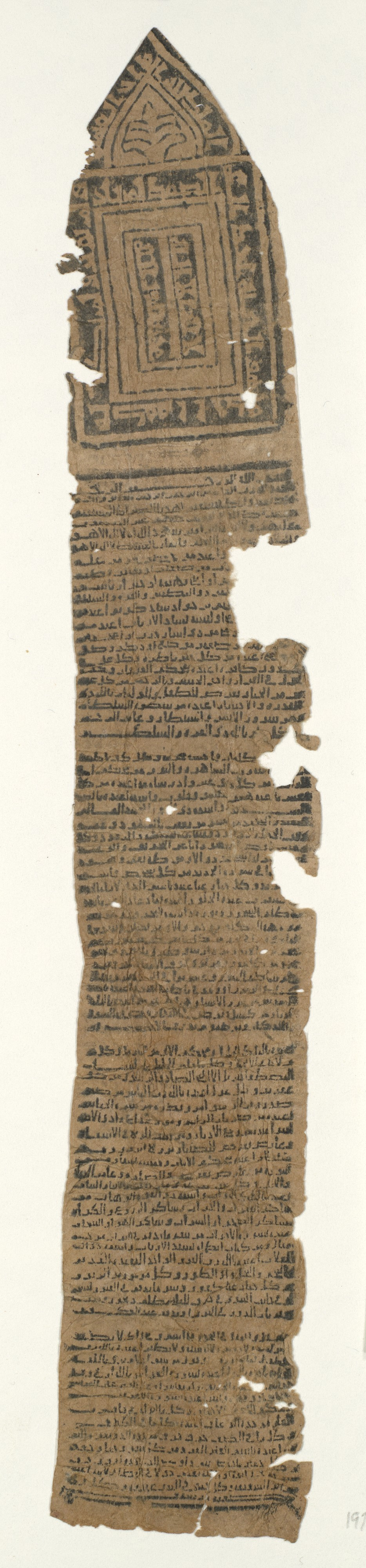
10th Century, one of the earliest Arabic blockprints in the world, yet the Met has failed to classify it as a print, nor accord it its due importance. Such mislabelling is common among many institutions, and is a detriment to study in the field and general awareness.

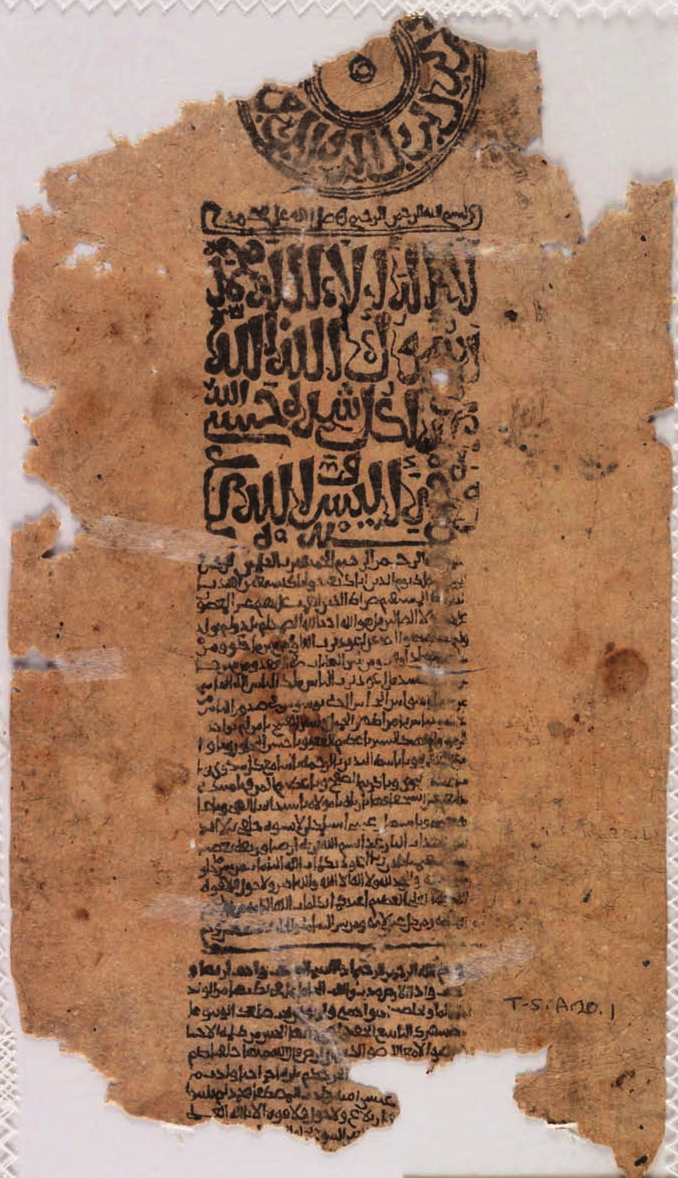
Maghrebi script

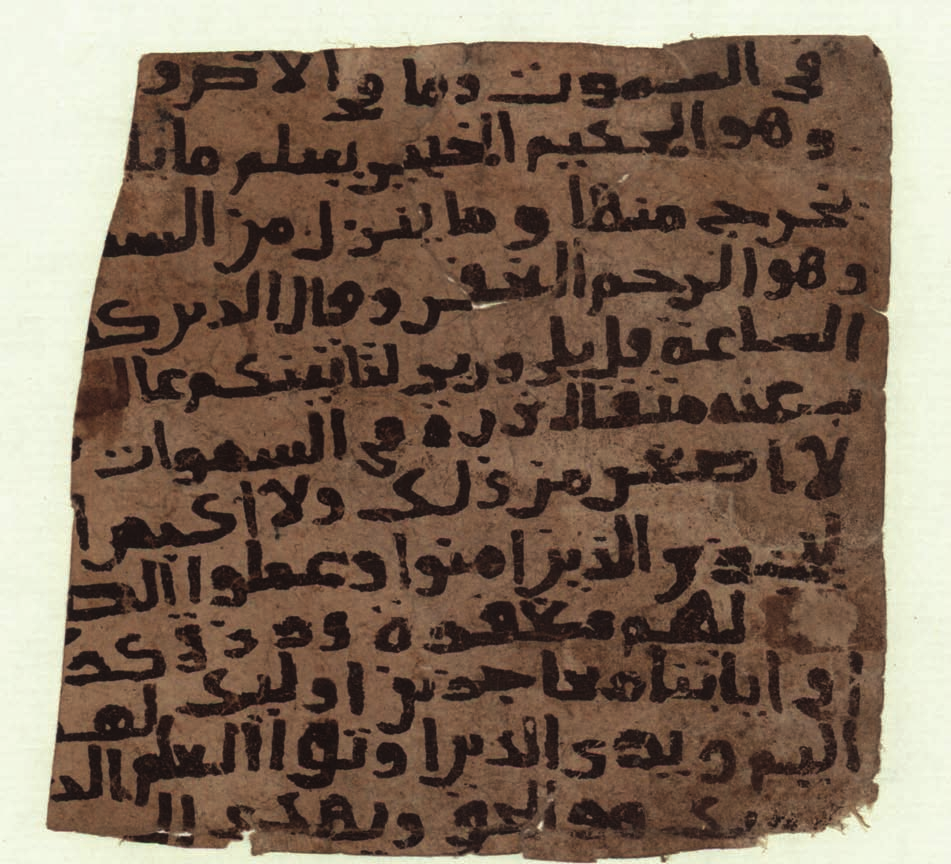
A unique fragment which quotes solely Quran (Surah Saba:1-6)

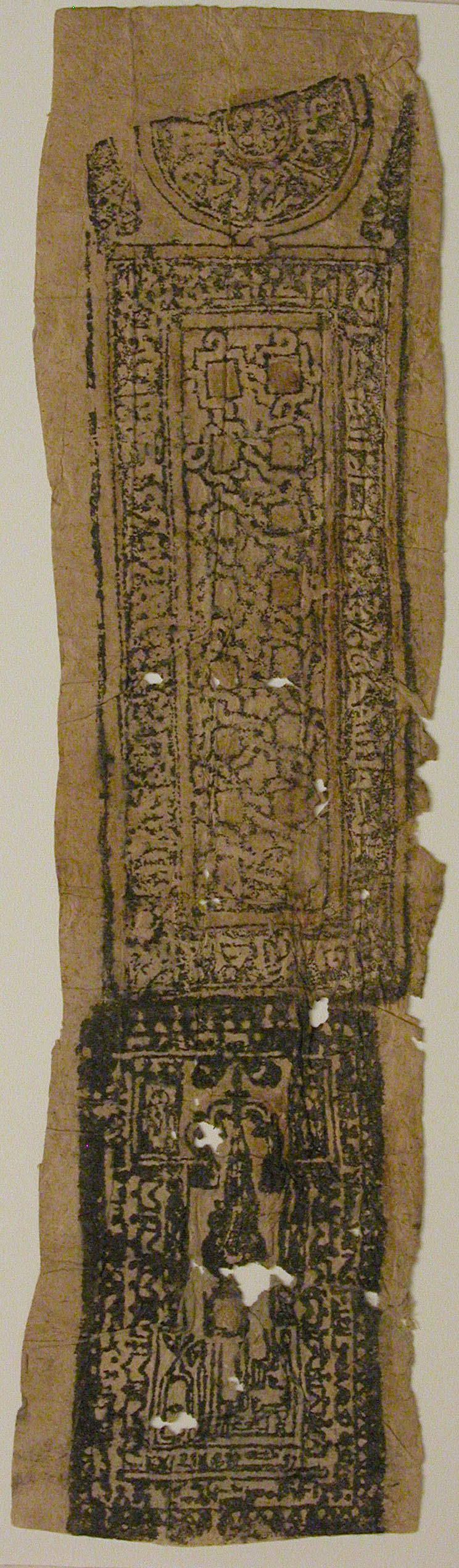
Dual-imaged 11th-12th century amulet features a circular Kufic-bordered medallion over a geometric "tile" floor. The lower section depicts a dark, poorly printed mihrab with a pendant lamp, framed by stylized tents possibly symbolizing Hajj

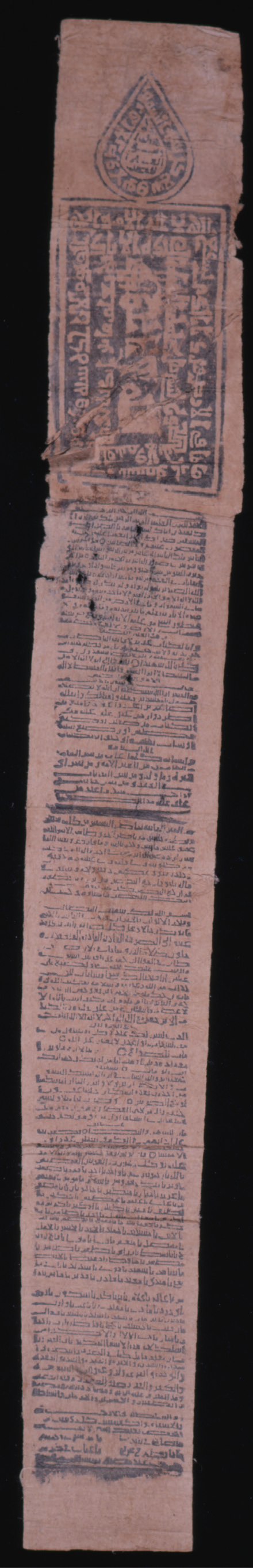
116 lines, the longest printed amulet by line count. Though physically much shorter than GM 03.1 Schr at only 13.5 cm

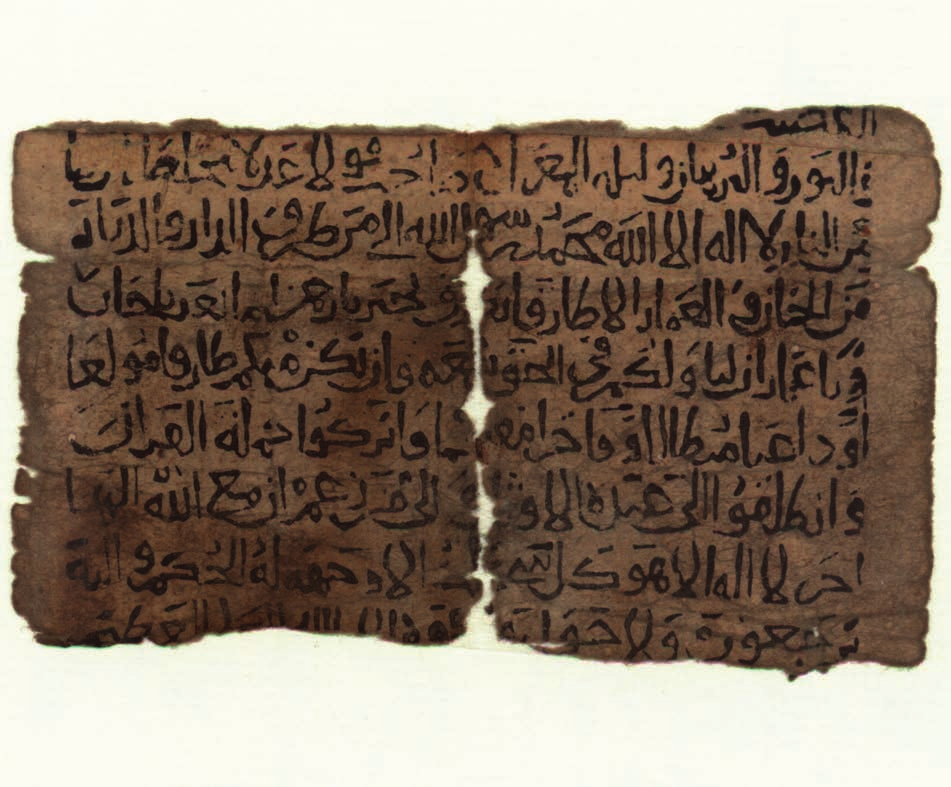
Thick naskh script with diacritics

== Bibliography ==
- Aksoy, Şule; Milstein, Rachel (2000). "A Collection of Thirteenth-Century Illustrated Hajj Certificates". In Schick, İrvin Cemil (ed.). M. Uğur Derman 65. Yaş Armağanı: Altmışbeşinci Yaşı Münasebetiyle Sunulmuş Tebliğler / M. Uğur Derman Festschrift: Papers Presented on the Occasion of His Sixty-fifth Birthday. Istanbul: Sabancı Üniversitesi. pp. 73–134. ISBN 978-975-8362-10-3.
- Bosworth, C. E. (1976). The Mediaeval Islamic Underworld: The Banū Sāsān in Arabic Society and Literature. Leiden: E. J. Brill.
- Bulliet, R. W. (1987). "Medieval Arabic Ṭarsh: A Forgotten Chapter in the History of Printing". Journal of the American Oriental Society. 107 (3): 427–438. doi:10.2307/603463. JSTOR 603463.
- Bulliet, R. W. (2000). "Ṭarsh". In Bearman, P. J.; Bianquis, Th.; Bosworth, C. E.; van Donzel, E. & Heinrichs, W. P. (eds.). The Encyclopaedia of Islam, Second Edition. Volume X: T–U. Leiden: E. J. Brill. p. 304. ISBN 978-90-04-11211-7.
- Levi Della Vida, G. (1944). "An Arabic Block Print". The Scientific Monthly. 59 (6): 473–474. Bibcode:1944SciMo..59..473D.
- Muehlhaeusler, Mark (2008). "Eight Arabic Block Prints from the Collection of Aziz S. Atiya". Arabica. 55 (5): 528–582. doi:10.1163/157005808X364580. ISSN 0570-5398.
- Rambach, A. D'Ottone (2013). "A Far Eastern Type of Print Technique for Islamic Amulets from the Mediterranean. An Unpublished Example". Scripta. 6: 67–74.
- Rambach, A. D'Ottone (2020). Unpublished examples of Block-Printed Arabic Amulets from the Qubbat al-khazna:The Damascus Fragments: Towards a History of the Qubbat al-khazna Corpus of Manuscripts and Documents. Ergon Verlag. pp. 409–438.
- Richardson, Kristina (2021). Roma in the Medieval Islamic World: Literacy, Culture, and Migration. Bloomsbury Academic.
- Roper, G. (2010). "The History of the Book in the Muslim World". In Suarez, Michael F.; H. R. Woudhuysen (eds.). The Oxford Companion to the Book. Oxford University Press. pp. 321–339.
- Schaefer, K. R. (2006). Enigmatic Charms: Medieval Arabic Block Printed Amulets in American and European Libraries and Museums. Leiden: E. J. Brill. doi:10.1163/9789047408529. ISBN 9789047408529.
- Schaefer, K. R. (2014). "Mediæval Arabic Block Printing: State of the Field". In Roper, G. (ed.). Historical Aspects of Printing and Publishing in Languages of the Middle East: Papers from the Symposium at the University of Leipzig, September 2008. Leiden: E. J. Brill. pp. 1–16. doi:10.1163/9789004255975. ISBN 9789004255975.
- Schaefer, Karl R. (2022a). "The Material Nature of Block Printed Amulets: What Makes Them Amulets?". Amulets and Talismans of the Middle East and North Africa in Context. Brill. pp. 180–208.
- Schaefer, Karl (2022b). "Malleable Magic: Medieval Arabic Block Printed Amulets and Their Audiences". Manuscript Cultures. 19: 157.
