= Black magic =

Magic used for evil and selfish purposes

Black magic (Middle English: nigromancy), sometimes dark magic, traditionally refers to the use of magic or supernatural powers for evil and selfish purposes.

The links and interaction between black magic and religion are many and varied. Beyond black magic's historical persecution by Christianity and its inquisitions, there are links between religious and black magic rituals. For example, 17th-century priest Étienne Guibourg is said to have performed a series of Black Mass rituals with alleged witch Catherine Monvoisin for Madame de Montespan. During his period of scholarship, A. E. Waite provided a comprehensive account of black magic practices, rituals and traditions in The Book of Ceremonial Magic (1911).

The influence of popular culture has allowed other practices to be drawn in under the broad banner of black magic, including the concept of Satanism. While the invocation of demons or spirits is an accepted part of black magic, this practice is distinct from the worship or deification of such spiritual beings. The two are usually combined in medieval beliefs about witchcraft. It is the malevolent counterpart of white magic.

== Etymology ==
The first known appearance of "black magic" in English is Edmund Spenser's epic poem The Faerie Queene, where he anglicizes the contemporary term "nigromancy", derived from Latin nigromantia, a medieval variant of necromantia "necromancy" influenced by Latin niger "black".

For he the tyraunt, which her hath in ward
By strong enchauntments and blacke Magicke leare
Hath in a dungeon deepe her close embard,
And many dreadfull feends hath pointed to her gard.

— Book III, Canto XI

== History ==
The lowest depths of black mysticism are well-nigh
as difficult to plumb as it is arduous to scale
the heights of sanctity. The Grand Masters of
the witch covens are men of genius – a foul genius,
crooked, distorted, disturbed, and diseased.

— Montague Summers
Witchcraft and Black Magic

Robert M. Place's 2009 book, Magic and Alchemy describes the origins of black magic as being like its counterpart white magic: traced to the primitive, ritualistic worship of spirits. Unlike white magic, in which Place sees parallels with primitive shamanistic efforts to achieve closeness with spiritual beings, the rituals that developed into modern black magic were designed to evoke those same spirits to produce beneficial outcomes for the practitioner. Place also provides a broad modern definition of both black and white magic, preferring instead to refer to them as "high magic" (white) and "low magic" (black) based primarily on intentions of the practitioner employing them. He acknowledges, though, that this broader definition (of "high" and "low") suffers from prejudices because good-intentioned folk magic may be considered "low" while ceremonial magic involving expensive or exclusive components may be considered by some as "high magic", regardless of intent.

During the Renaissance, many magical practices and rituals were considered evil or irreligious and by extension, black magic in the broad sense. Witchcraft and non-mainstream esoteric study were prohibited and targeted by the Inquisition. As a result, natural magic developed as a way for thinkers and intellectuals, like Marsilio Ficino, abbot Johannes Trithemius and Heinrich Cornelius Agrippa, to advance esoteric and ritualistic study (though still often in secret) without significant persecution.

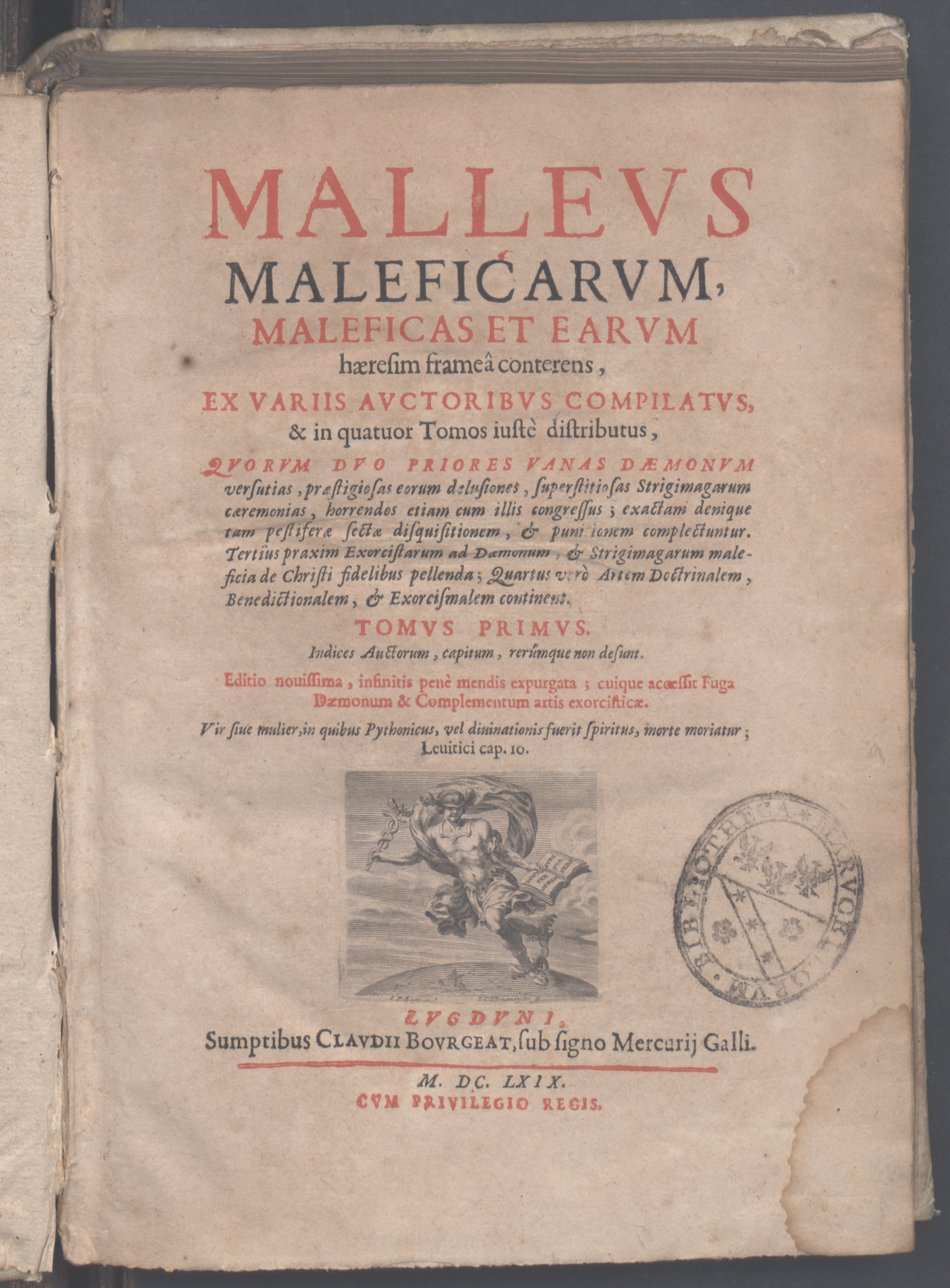
Malleus Maleficarum, 1669 edition

While "natural magic" became popular among the educated and upper classes of the 16th and 17th century, ritualistic magic and folk magic remained subject to persecution. Twentieth-century writer Montague Summers generally rejects the definitions of "white" and "black" magic as "contradictory", though he highlights the extent to which magic in general, regardless of intent, was considered "black" and cites William Perkins posthumous 1608 instructions in that regard:

All witches "convicted by the Magistrate" should be executed. He allows no exception and under this condemnation fall "all Diviners, Charmers, Jugglers, all Wizards, commonly called wise men or wise women". All those purported "good Witches which do not hurt but good, which do not spoil and destroy, but save and deliver" should come under the extreme sentence.

In particular, though, the term was most commonly reserved for those accused of invoking demons and other evil spirits, those hexing or cursing their neighbours, those using magic to destroy crops, and those capable of leaving their earthly bodies and travelling great distances in spirit (to which the Malleus Maleficarum "devotes one long and important chapter"), usually to engage in devil-worship. Summers also highlights the etymological development of the term nigromancer, in common use from 1200 to approximately 1500, (Latin: niger, black; Greek: μαντεία, divination), broadly "one skilled in the black arts".

In a modern context, the line between white magic and black magic is somewhat clearer and most modern definitions focus on intent rather than practice. There is also an extent to which many modern Wicca and witchcraft practitioners have sought to distance themselves from those intent on practising black magic. Those who seek to do harm or evil are less likely to be accepted into mainstream Wiccan circles or covens in an era where benevolent magic is increasingly associated with new-age beliefs and practices, and self-help spiritualism.

== Artes prohibitae and artes magicae ==
Seven artes prohibitae or artes magicae were arts prohibited by canon law as expounded by Johannes Hartlieb in 1456. Their sevenfold partition reflecting that of the artes liberales and artes mechanicae. While the term nigromancy broadly construed includes the six associated divinatory practices, it more specifically refers to the demonic magic of the Late Middle Ages. Demonic magic was performed in groups surrounding a leader in possession of a grimoire. Practitioners were typically members of the educated elite, as most grimoires were written in Latin. One such case in 1444, Inquisitor Gaspare Sighicelli took action against a group active in Bologna. Marco Mattei of Gesso and friar Jacopo of Viterbo confessed to taking part in magical practices. Nigromancy may include, but is not a synonym for, necromancy ("death magic").

== Voodoo ==
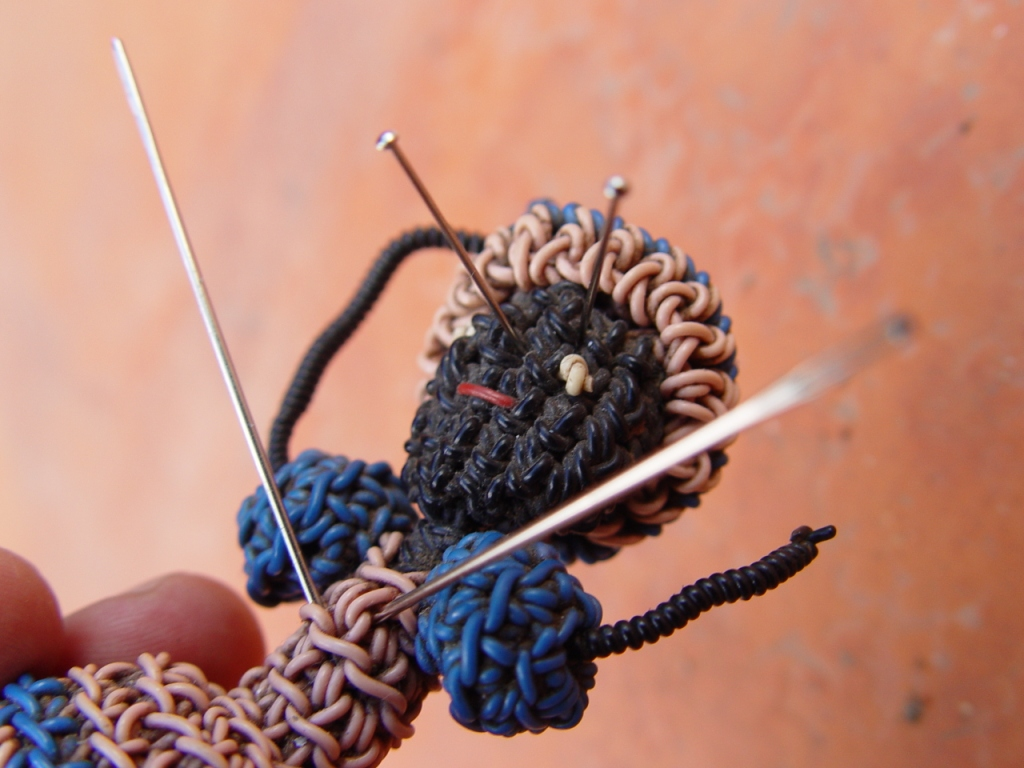
Voodoo doll

Voodoo has been associated with modern black magic; drawn together in popular culture and fiction. However, while hexing or cursing may be accepted black magic practices, Voodoo has its own distinct history and traditions.

Voodoo tradition makes its own distinction between black and white magic, with sorcerers like the bokor known for using magic and rituals of both. But practitioners' penchant for magic associated with curses, poisons and zombies means they, and Voodoo in general, are regularly associated with black magic.

== Modern accusations ==
In the 2022 Russian invasion of Ukraine, Russian state media accused Ukraine of using black magic to fend off the Russian military, specifically accusing Oleksiy Arestovych of enlisting sorcerers and witches as Ukrainian soldiers who were consecrating "weapons with blood magick".

== See also ==
- Demonology – Study of demons or beliefs about demons
- Filipino witches – Users of black magic in Philippine folklore
- Gray magic – Form of supernatural magic
- Gu – Venom-based poison associated with cultures of south China, particularly Nanyue
- Sexuality in Christian demonology (incubus and succubus)
