= Rosemary Ellen Guiley =

American writer

- Born: July 8, 1950
- Died: July 18, 2019 (aged 69)
- Occupations: Writer, radio show host
- Writing career
- Subject: Western esotericism
- Website: visionaryliving.com

Rosemary Ellen Guiley (July 8, 1950 - July 18, 2019) was an American writer on topics related to spirituality, the occult, and the paranormal. She was also a radio show host, a certified hypnotist, a board director of the "National Museum of Mysteries and Research" and the "Foundation for Research into Extraterrestrial Encounters", and a "Lifetime Achievement Award" winner from the Upper Peninsula Paranormal Research Society, Michigan. She has written more than 49 books, including ten encyclopedias.

Guiley died on Thursday, July 18, 2019, of colon cancer.

== Works ==
Her works include Atlas of the Mysterious in North America (1995) – a listing of places in Canada and the US associated with mysterious occurrences; The Encyclopedia of Witches and Witchcraft; Harper's Encyclopedia of Mystical & Paranormal Experience – a reference book on topics related to spirituality, mythology and New Age; and The Encyclopedia of Angels.

In 2011, Guiley published Talking to the Dead via Tor Books, co-authored with George Noory. She was working with Darren Evans on the book The Zozo Phenomenon which was published by Visionary Living, Inc.

== Activities ==
Guiley was a consulting editor of Fate magazine and a regular guest on Coast to Coast AM. She has made television appearances on various networks, including A&E, The History Channel and The Discovery Channel. Her work has been translated into 14 languages. She took part in conventions and events like the International U.F.O Congress and Conference, Vail Symposium, and Michigan Paranormal Convention.

== Response ==
Christian evangelist John Ankerberg criticized Guiley's understanding of intuition (as she described it in Harper's Encyclopedia of Mystical and Paranormal Experience – "intuition invariably proves to be right"), saying that with beliefs like those, rational thinking and spiritual discernment are often discarded. He also interprets from her book Angels of Mercy that she and other New Age writers of angel literature are unwittingly relating to fallen angels/demons. In Angels of Mercy Ankerberg criticizes Guiley's assertion that "angels" should be trusted unconditionally without the fear-based belief that they might be demons, saying that it is irrational and that he believes demons are indeed impersonating angels.

== Bibliography ==
- The Encyclopedia of Witches, Witchcraft & Wicca. Facts On File, 1989.

Third edition: Infobase Publishing, 2008. ISBN 0-8160-7103-9

- Tales of Reincarnation. Pocket Books, 1989. ISBN 0-671-66257-0.
- Harper's Encyclopedia of Mystical & Paranormal Experience. Harper San Francisco, 1991. ISBN 0-06-250366-9.

Second edition: Castle Books, 1994. ISBN 0-7858-0202-9.

- Vampires Among Us. Pocket Books, 1991.

Second edition: Pocket Books, 1991. ISBN 0-671-72361-8.
Rosemary Ellen Guiley's Vampires Among Us Revised Edition. E-book, 2011.

- Moonscapes: A Celebration of Lunar Astronomy, Magic, Legend and Lore. Prentice Hall Press, 1991. ISBN 0-13-541681-7
- The Mystical Tarot. Signet Books, 1991. ISBN 0-451-16800-3.
- The Encyclopedia of Ghosts and Spirits. Facts On File, 1992. ISBN 0-8160-2140-6

Third edition: Facts On File, 2007. Foreword by Troy Taylor. ISBN 0-8160-6737-6

- The Encyclopedia of Dreams: Symbols and Interpretations. Crossroad Publishing Company, 1993.

Second edition: Berkley Pub Group, 1995. ISBN 0-425-14788-6.

- The Complete Vampire Companion. Macmillan Publishers, 1994. ISBN 0-671-85024-5. With J.B. Macabre.
- Angels of Mercy. Pocket Books, 1994. ISBN 0-671-77094-2.
- Atlas of the Mysterious in North America. Facts On File, 1995. ISBN 0-8160-2876-1.
- The Angels Tarot. HarperSanFrancisco, 1995. ISBN 0-06-251193-9. With Robert M. Place.
- The Alchemical Tarot. Thorsons, 1995. ISBN 1-85538-301-2. With Robert M. Place.
- The Miracle of Prayer: True Stories of Blessed Healings. Pocket Books, 1995. ISBN 0-671-75692-3.
- The Encyclopedia of Angels. Facts On File, 1996. ISBN 0-8160-2988-1

Second edition: Facts on File, 2004. ISBN 0-8160-5024-4. Foreword by Lisa J. Schwebel.

- Blessings: Prayers for the Home and Family. Pocket Books, 1996. ISBN 0-671-53713-X.

Second edition: Simon & Schuster, 1998. ISBN 0-671-53714-8.

- Dreamwork For The Soul. Berkley Books, 1998. ISBN 0-425-16504-3.
- Wellness: Prayers for Comfort and Healing. Simon & Schuster, 1998. ISBN 0-671-53712-1.
- I Bring You Glad Tidings. Simon & Schuster, 1999. ISBN 0-671-02612-7.

Second edition: Simon & Schuster, 2010. ISBN 1-4516-0604-4.

- An Angel in Your Pocket. Thorsons, 1999. ISBN 0-7225-3967-3.
- Prayer Works: True Stories of Answered Prayer. Unity School of Christianity, 1999. ISBN 0-87159-243-6.
- Encyclopedia of the Strange, Mystical & Unexplained. Gramercy Books, 2001. ISBN 0-517-16278-4.
- Dreamspeak: How To Understand the Messages in Your Dreams. Berkley Books, 2001. ISBN 0-425-18142-1.
- The Encyclopedia of Saints. Infobase Publishing, 2001. ISBN 0-8160-4134-2.
- A Miracle in Your Pocket. Thorsons, 2001. ISBN 0-00-711530-X.
- Breakthrough Intuition. Penguin Group USA, 2002. ISBN 0-425-17655-X.
- The Quotable Saint. Infobase Publishing, 2002. ISBN 0-8160-4375-2.
- Ask the Angels. Element Books, 2003. ISBN 0-00-715130-6.

2009 edition: HarperCollins. ISBN 0-00-732360-3.

- The Encyclopedia of Vampires, Werewolves and Other Monsters. Infobase Publishing, 2004. ISBN 0-8160-4684-0.

Second edition: The Encyclopedia of Vampires and Werewolves. Facts On File, 2011. ISBN 0-8160-8180-8.

- The Dreamer's Way: Using Proactive Dreaming To Heal And Transform Your Life. Berkley Books, 2004. ISBN 0-425-19423-X.
- Fairy Magic. Thorsons Element, 2004. ISBN 0-00-715129-2.
- The Tao of Dreaming. Berkley Books, 2005. ISBN 0-425-20280-1. With Sheryl Martin.
- Angel Magic For Love and Romance. Galde Press, 2005. ISBN 1-931942-14-5.
- The Encyclopedia of Magic and Alchemy. Infobase Publishing, 2006. ISBN 0-8160-6048-7.
- Vampires. Infobase Publishing, 2008. ISBN 0-7910-9398-0.
- Ghosts and Haunted Places. Infobase Publishing, 2008. ISBN 0-7910-9392-1.
- Witches and Wiccans. Infobase Publishing, 2008. ISBN 0-7910-9397-2.
- The Encyclopedia of Demons and Demonology. Infobase Publishing, 2009. ISBN 0-8160-7314-7. Foreword by John Zaffis.
- Dreams and Astral Travel. Infobase Publishing, 2009. ISBN 0-7910-9387-5.
- Ghosthunting Pennsylvania. Clerisy Press, 2009. ISBN 1-57860-353-6.
- Spirit Communications. Infobase Publishing, 2009. ISBN 0-7910-9391-3.
- Fairies. Infobase Publishing, 2009. ISBN 1-60413-630-8.
- Haunted Salem: Strange Phenomena in the Witch City. Stackpole Books, 2011. ISBN 0-8117-0756-3.
- Talking to the Dead. Tor Books, 2011. ISBN 0-7653-2538-1. With George Noory.
- The Vengeful Djinn: Unveiling the Hidden Agendas of Genies. Llewellyn Worldwide, 2011. ISBN 0-7387-2171-9. With Philip Imbrogno.
- Ouija Gone Wild: Shocking True Stories. Visionary Living, 2012. ISBN 978-0985724306. With Rick Fisher.
- Monsters of West Virginia: Mysterious Creatures in the Mountain State. Stackpole Books, 2012. ISBN 978-0811710282.
- The Big Book of West Virginia Ghost Stories. Stackpole Books, 2014. ISBN 978-0811711159.
- Haunted by the Things You Love. Visionary Living, 2014. ISBN 978-0986077814. With John Zaffis.
- Haunted Hills and Hollows: What Lurks in Greene County, Pennsylvania. Visionary Living, 2018. ISBN 978-1942157311. With Kevin Paul.

== Documentaries and TV shows ==
- Children of the Grave (2008) (writer) The Sci-Fi Channel
- The Lost Tapes (seasons 2 and 3). Animal Planet.
- The Haunted. Animal Planet.
- Angels: Good or Evil. History Channel.
- Witchcraft in Salem, Mysterious Journeys. The Travel Channel
- The Secret Life of Vampires, A&E
- Dreams and Food, The Discovery Health Channel
- Divine Magic: The World of the Supernatural: The Restless Dead, Time-Life Films
- Divine Magic: The World of the Supernatural: Dreams of Gold, Time-Life Films
- The Quest: Lunar Mysteries, Discovery Channel
- Adventures Beyond: America's Most Haunted, Bob Schott Productions
- The Science and Power of Prayer, Hartley Film Foundation
- The Possessed (2009)
