= White magic =

Magic used for selfless purposes

White magic has traditionally referred to the use of supernatural powers or magic for selfless purposes. Practitioners of white magic have been given titles such as wise men or women, healers, white witches or wizards. Many of these people claimed to have the ability to do such things because of knowledge or power that was passed on to them through hereditary lines, or by some event later in their lives. White magic is practiced through healing, blessing, charms, incantations, prayers, and songs. White magic is the benevolent counterpart of malicious black magic.

== History ==
=== Early origins ===
In his 1978 book, A History of White Magic, recognised occult author Gareth Knight traces the origins of white magic to early adaptations of Paleolithic religion and early religious history in general, including the polytheistic traditions. of Ancient Egypt and the later monotheistic ideas of Judaism and early Christianity.

In particular, he traced many of the traditions of white magic to the early worship of local "gods and goddesses of fertility and vegetation who were usually worshipped at hill-top shrines" and were "attractive to a nomadic race settling down to an agricultural existence". He focuses in particular on the nomadic Hebrew-speaking tribes and suggests that early Jews saw the worship of such deities more in terms of atavism than evil. It was only when the polytheistic and pagan Roman Empire began to expand that Jewish leaders began to rally against those ideas.

Early origins of white magic can also be traced back to the cunning folk.

=== During the Renaissance ===
By the late 15th century, natural magic "had become much discussed in high-cultural circles". Followers of Marsilio Ficino advocated the existence of spiritual beings and spirits in general, though many such theories ran counter to the ideas of the later Age of Enlightenment. While Ficino and his supporters were treated with hostility by the Roman Catholic Church, the Church itself also acknowledged the existence of such beings; such acknowledgment was the crux of campaigns against witchcraft. Ficino, though, theorized a "purely natural" magic that did not require the invocation of spirits, malevolent or malicious. In doing so, he came into conflict with Johannes Trithemius who refused to believe in Ficino's theory but created spells and incantations of his own related to beneficial communication with spirits. His works, including the Steganographia, were not published until the 17th century and were then immediately placed on the Index Librorum Prohibitorum where they remained until the 20th century. Trithemius' "disciple" Heinrich Cornelius Agrippa was responsible for publishing some of his work and in turn created his own. His work included the De occulta philosophia libri tres which contained an outline of, among other things, classical elements, numerology, astrology and kabbalah and detailed ways of utilizing these relationships and laws in medicine, scrying, alchemy and rituals and ceremonies. Giambattista della Porta expanded on many of these ideas in his Magia Naturalis.

It is the coming-together of these ideas - early natural religions and later philosophical thinking - that Knight suggests is "at the root of the Western tradition of white magic". Also at the root of white magic are symbols and religious symbolism in particular. Knight's example of the star was of critical importance to Jewish tradition and then to early Christians (like the Star of David) and to later Masonic tradition and Neo-paganism. It continues to be of importance of white magic practitioners in the form of the pentagram and night-time ritual.

Zambelli goes further and suggests that white magic, though then not specifically distinct from its counterpart black magic, grew as the more acceptable form of occult and pagan study in the era of the Inquisition and anti-witchcraft sentiment. If black magic was that which involved Trithemius' invocation of demons, Ficino's "purely natural" white magic could be framed as the study of natural phenomena in general with no evil or irreligious intent. Zambelli categorizes figures like Giordano Bruno as clandestine practitioners of magic.

== Modern interpretations ==
In his 2009 book, Magic and Alchemy, Robert M. Place provides a broad modern definition of both black and white magic, preferring instead to refer to them as "high magic" (white) and "low magic" (black) based primarily on intentions of the practitioner employing them. His modern definition maintains that the purpose of white magic is to "do good" or to "bring the practitioner to a higher spiritual state" of enlightenment or consciousness. He acknowledges, though, that this broader definition (of "high" and "low") suffers from prejudices as good-intentioned folk magic may be considered "low" while ceremonial magic involving expensive or exclusive components may be considered by some as "high magic", regardless of intent.

According to Place, effectively all prehistoric shamanistic magic was "helping" white magic and thus the basic essence of that magic forms the framework of modern white magic: curing illness or injury, divining the future or interpreting dreams, finding lost items, appeasing spirits, controlling weather or harvest and generating good luck or well-being.

== Goddess worship ==
Modern white magic is associated with feminine concepts like that of a Mother goddess, fae, nature spirits, oneness with nature and goddess worship. In modern stories or fairy tales, the idea of "white witchcraft" is often associated with a kindly grandmother or caring motherly spirit. The link between white magic and a Mother Earth is a regular theme of the practitioner Marian Green's written work.

== See also ==
- Gray magic – Form of supernatural magic
- Thaumaturgy – Working of magical feats by an individual
- Theurgy – Magic used to invoke divine presence
- Wicca – Modern syncretic pagan religion
