= Gray magic =

Form of supernatural magic

Gray magic, also known as neutral magic, is magic that is not performed for specifically beneficial reasons, but is also not focused on completely hostile practices. It is seen as falling into a continuum between white and black magic.

== Overview ==
According to D. J. Conway, practitioners of white magic avoid causing any form of harm, even to enact positive outcomes. Gray magic incorporates all the beneficial purposes of white magic but also works towards ridding the world of evils. Ann Finnin states that many practitioners of gray magic employ the term because of its vagueness, and to avoid having to consider ethical questions.

A rather different meaning to the term was given by Robert Cochrane, a British Neopagan witch of the 1960s. For Bowers, it was a technique of baffling, bewildering, and mystifying everyone he met to gain power over them; by doing so, he was always more sure about them than they were about him.

== Popular Culture ==
- In Playmobil series Super Four episode Grey Magic dealt with the villain Fourchesac using Grey Magic and eating up white magic.

== See also ==
- Left-hand path and right-hand path – Dichotomy between two opposing approaches to magic
