= Al-Jawbari =

Medieval Syrian Arab author and scholar known for his denunciation of alchemy

Abd al-Raḥīm ibn ʿUmar ibn Abī Bakr Jamāl al-Dīn al-Dimashqī
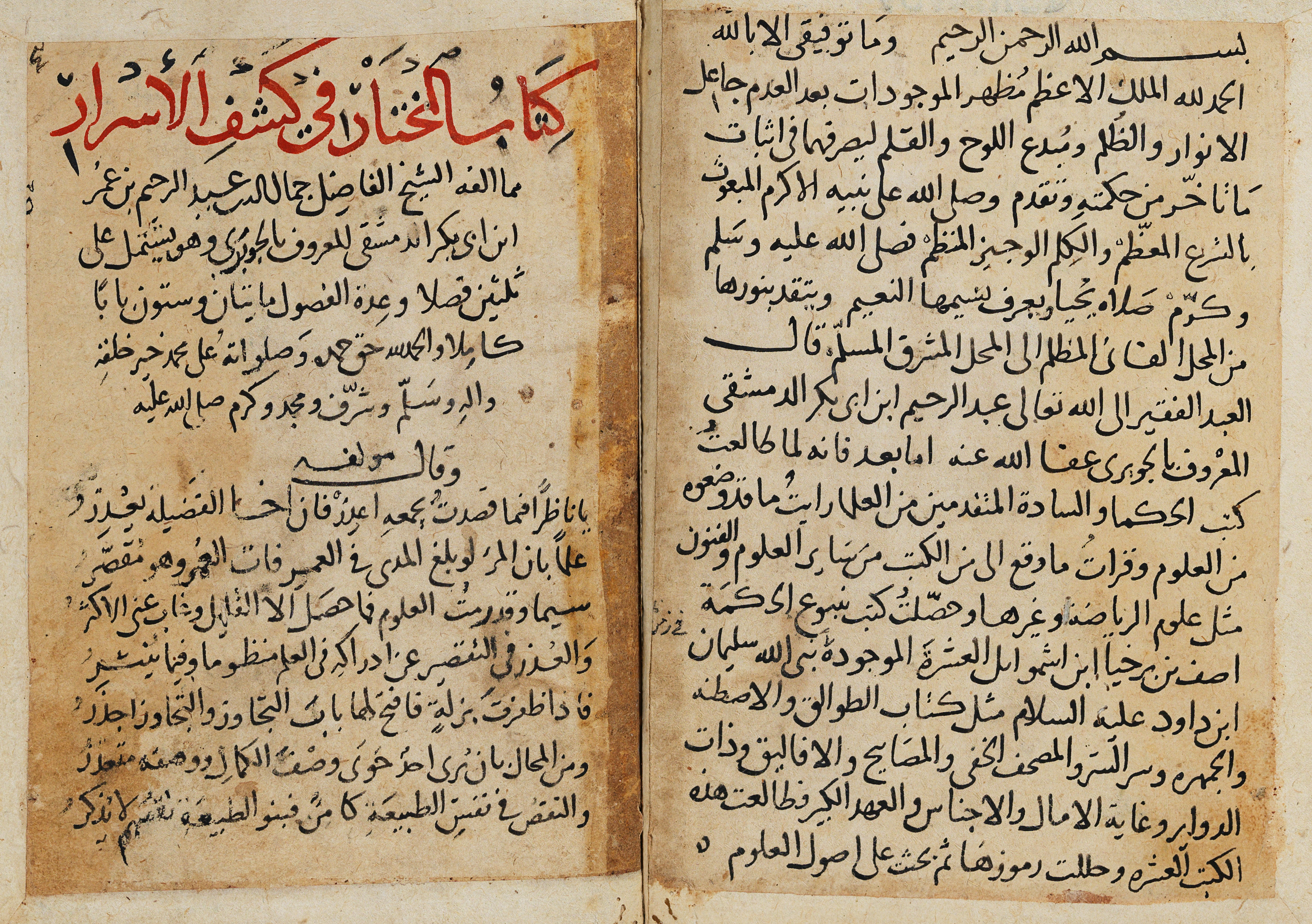
- 14th century manuscript copy of the opening of al-Jawbarī's Book of Selected Disclosure of Secrets
- Native name: الجوبري
- Born: Syria
- Subject: Science

ʿAbd al-Raḥīm ibn ʿUmar ibn Abī Bakr Jamāl al-Dīn al-Dimashqī (Arabic: عبد الرحيم بن عمر بن أبي بكر جمال الدين الدمشقي), commonly known as al-Jawbarī (Arabic: الجوبري; fl. 619/1222), was a medieval Syrian Arab author and scholar known for his denunciation of alchemy.

Born in Jawbar, Syria, Al-Jawbari traveled extensively throughout the Islamic Empire, including visits as far as India. Among other locations, the scholar lived in Harrân and Kôniya.

Al-Jawbari wrote his Kitāb al-mukhtār fī kashf al-asrār (Book of Selected Disclosure of Secrets), exposing the fraudulence he had seen practiced by alchemists and money changers. Among others, he wrote of "the people of al-Kimya (alchemists) who know three hundred ways of making dupes". The book also describes the preparation of rose water.

He also wrote The Book of Charlatans where he describes different types of criminals, murderers and thieves. He explains the idea of 'honor among thieves' and his book also details the specific methods of how thieves broke into houses among many other related things.

In November 2020, a bilingual Arabic-English edition was published as The Book of Charlatans by New York University Press This edition was edited by Manuela Dengler and translated by Humphrey Davis.
