= Robert M. Place =

American artist and writer (born 1947)

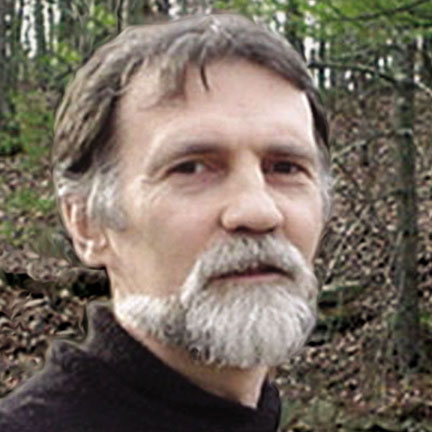
- Robert M. Place, May 2005
- Occupations: illustrator, writer, artist, jeweler, lecturer
- Spouse: Rose Ann Place
- Website: robertmplacetarot.com

Robert M. Place (born 1947) is an American artist and writer known for his work on Tarot history, symbolism, and divination.

== Work as an artist ==
Place has worked since the 1970s as a sculptor, jeweler and illustrator. His sculpture has been exhibited on the White House Christmas tree, in the New York State Museum, the Delaware Art Museum, and the Irish American Heritage Museum. Place’s jewelry has been exhibited in the American Craft Museum, the Philadelphia Museum of Art, the Montclair Art Museum, the Summit Art Center, the International Wilhelm Muller Competition (which toured museums in Germany), the Birmingham Institute of Art and Design, and in numerous galleries in the United States, Ireland, Britain, and Japan. He was awarded a 1984-85 New Jersey State Council on the Arts Fellowship and the Niche Magazine award for outstanding achievement in metal sculpture in 1990 and 1991.

== Work as tarot designer and author ==
In the 1990s, Place turned his attention as an illustrator to the creation of tarot decks and began his career as an author. Place is best known as the creator of The Alchemical Tarot, his first deck and book combination, which is illustrated in the style of 17th century alchemical engravings and which presents a parallel between the “great work” of alchemy, which leads to the creation of the philosopher’s stone and the allegory in the tarot’s trumps.

In his other decks, The Angels Tarot, The Tarot of the Saints, and The Buddha Tarot, Place has explored the connection between religion, mysticism, and the tarot’s symbolism.

In his fifth book, The Tarot: History, Symbolism, and Divination, his first book published not in connection with a tarot deck, Place contributed to the field of tarot history by discussing the images in the tarot in relation to the iconography of the 15th century Italian Renaissance, the era when the tarot was created. Place relates each image in the tarot to similar images created at that time and presents a theory of interpretation that is rooted in the art and philosophy of the time. The book also discusses contrasting occult theories and champions Pamela Colman Smith as the primary designer of the Waite–Smith tarot.

"Booklist", the publication of the American Library Association, has said that The Tarot: History, Symbolism, and Divination “may be the best book ever written on that deck of cards decorated with mysterious images called the tarot.”

An autobiography of Robert M. Place as a creator and scholar of Tarot was published in 2025 in the international magazine TAROT FOCUS.

Robert Place has been a frequent lecturer and teacher of Western mysticism and the history and use of the tarot. Besides teaching regularly at the New York Open Center since 1996 and at the Metropolitan Museum of Art in New York since 2009, he has taught at the World Tarot Congress, in Chicago and in Dallas; the Southeast Tarot Congress, in Florida; the New York Reader's Studio; The Third International Conference of the Association for Esoteric Studies, in Charleston; The Omega Institute, in New York; The New York Theosophical Society; Columbia University; The Museo Dei Tarocchi, in Riola, Italy; The Tarot Guild of Australia, Melbourne; Cartomancia, in São Paulo, Brazil; and he has given workshops in Los Angeles, Salt Lake City, Las Vegas; and since 2017, in Beijing, Shanghai, and Hangzhou, China. In 2023, he was the main presenter at the International Deck and Tarot Congress in Toledo, Spain. His lectures have appeared on the BBC, the Learning Channel, Discovery, and A&E.

In July, 2007, Place had the honor of cutting the ribbon at the grand opening of the Museo dei Tarocchi, in Riola, Italy. Place was also the curator of an exhibition on the art and history of the tarot, which was held at the Los Angeles Craft and Folk Art Museum, from January 23, 2010, to May 9, 2010, and is the subject of his book, The Fool's Journey: the History, Art, & Symbolism of the Tarot. His facsimile of one of the earliest Italian Renaissance woodcut Tarots is included in the Metropolitan Museum of Art in New York.

== Tarot and divination decks ==
- The Alchemical Tarot Reimagined, ISBN 9781736068878
- The First Occult Tarot: The Deck Envisioned by Louis-Raphael-Lucrece de Fayolle, comte de Mellet in 1781, ISBN 9781736068847
- The Alchemical Tarot: Renewed 6th Edition-The Blue Sky Edition, ISBN 9781736068823
- The Alchemical Tarot of Marseille, ISBN 9781736068809
- The Tarot of the Sevenfold Mystery 2nd Edition, ISBN 9780991529971
- The Alchemical Tarot: Renewed 5th Edition, ISBN 9780991529995
- The Tarot of the Alchemical Magnum Opus, ISBN 9780991529957
- An Ukiyo-e Lenormand, ISBN 9780991529940
- The Raziel Tarot: the Secret Teachings of Adam and Eve, ISBN 9780991529919
- The Marziano Tarot, ISBN 9780991529926
- The Hermes Playing Card Oracle, ISBN 9780692562383
- The New York Lenormand
- The Burning Serpent Oracle, ISBN 9780991529926
- Facsimile Italian Renaissance Woodcut Tarocchi
- The Tarot of the Sevenfold Mystery, ISBN 9780615700779
- The Annotated Tarot of the Sevenfold Mystery, ISBN 9781935194026
- The Vampire Tarot, ISBN 9780312361624
- The Buddha Tarot, ISBN 0738704415
- The Tarot of the Saints, ISBN 1567185274
- The Angels Tarot
- The Alchemical Tarot: Renewed, Editions 2, 3, and 4, ISBN 9780977643417
- The Alchemical Tarot: Art Edition
- The Alchemical Tarot, ISBN 1855383012

== Books ==
- The First Occult Tarot, As Envisioned by Louis-Rapharl-Lucrece de Fayolle, comte de Mellet in 1781, 2023 ISBN 9781736068830
- The Tarot, Magic, Alchemy, Hermeticism, and Neoplatonism, Third Edition 2021, ISBN 9781736068816
- The Tarot, Magic, Alchemy, Hermeticism, and Neoplatonism, Second Edition 2019, ISBN 9780991529964
- Alchemy and the Tarot: An Examination of the Historic Connection between Alchemy and the Tarot, with a Guide to The Alchemical Tarot, 2011, ISBN 9780615543420
- The Fool's Journey: the History, Art, & Symbolism of the Tarot, 2010, ISBN 9780557533503
- Mysteries, Legends, and Unexplained Phenomena Series: Magic and Alchemy, 2009, ISBN 978-0-7910-9390-0
- The Vampire Tarot, 2009, ISBN 0312361629 ISBN 9780312361624
- Mysteries, Legends, and Unexplained Phenomena Series: Shamanism, 2008, ISBN 0791093964 ISBN 9780791093962
- Mysteries, Legends, and Unexplained Phenomena Series: Astrology and Divination, 2008, ISBN 9780791093856
- The Tarot: History, Symbolism, and Divination, 2005, ISBN 1585423491
- The Buddha Tarot Companion: A Mandala of Cards, 2004, ISBN 1567185290
- A Gnostic Book of Saints, 2001, ISBN 0738701165
- The Angels Tarot, coauthored with Rosemary Ellen Guiley, 1995, ISBN 0062511939
- The Alchemical Tarot, coauthored with Rosemary Ellen Guiley, 1995, ISBN 1855383012
