= Pura Arcos =

Valencia anarchist activist (1919–1995)

- Born: Purificació Pérez Benavent; 26 June 1919; València, Spain
- Died: 12 October 1995 (aged 76); Windsor, Ontario, Canada
- Occupations: Teacher, nurse
- Organizations: Mujeres Libres; National Confederation of Labour
- Movement: Anarchism
- Partner: Federico Arcos

Pura Arcos (née Pérez Benavent; 26 June 1919 – 12 October 1995) was a Valencian anarchist-feminist activist. Born into a working-class family in València and raised in Xàtiva, she became involved in the anarchist movement after moving to Barcelona. After the Spanish Revolution of 1936, she became a leading member of the Mujeres Libres and worked as a teacher at a collective in Tavernes de la Valldigna. She went into hiding during the early years of the Francoist dictatorship, but managed to escape repression and emigrated to Canada, where she became a nurse, made pressed flower art and remained active in the Mujeres Libres.

== Biography ==
=== Early life and education ===
Purificació Pérez Benavent was born in València, on 26 June 1919. When she was three years old, her family moved to Xàtiva, where she grew up. Her father and grandfather were both transport workers and members of the National Confederation of Labour (CNT), an anarcho-syndicalist trade union federation, and she grew up hearing regular discussions about social injustice.

Despite most girls in Spain at the time not receiving any form of education, not even in basic literacy, Pura insisted that her parents send her to primary school along with her older cousin. She remained in school even after the expected leaving age of 11. The new government of the Spanish Republic, formed in 1931, established many new secondary schools, which allowed her to continue her education. But after her father moved to Barcelona in 1933, she was forced to leave school and begin working, in order to help her family pay the higher cost of living in the city.

She continued her education by night at the Escola Natura, a Ferrer school run by Joan Puig Elias in El Clot. There she met other young anarchists and joined the Libertarian Youth (FIJL) organization. She experienced misogyny from male anarchists at meetings of the FIJL, recalling that the boys "would often laugh at [the girls] even before they spoke". It was through the FIJL that she met Federico Arcos; they often walked home together from the local ateneo popular, and soon became each other's life partner. According to Marilynn Rashid, Pura's "sharp, opinionated realism" often tempered Federico's romanticism.

=== Revolution and Civil War ===
Following the outbreak of the Spanish Revolution of 1936, she joined the Mujeres Libres, an anarchist feminist organization, alongside Soledad Estorach and Suceso Portales. Through the Mujeres Libres and its connections with the CNT Transport Workers' Union, Pura trained to drive a tram and was among the first women to receive tram drivers' licenses in Barcelona; she recalled her comrades from the union enjoyed seeing passengers' faces when women began serving as tram drivers. She soon joined the national sub-committee of the Mujeres Libres, and worked for its Propaganda Secretariat. She also worked as a secretary in the sub-committees of local branches of the CNT and FIJL, but she soon became disillusioned with the leadership of these organizations.

In mid-1937, she decided to return to the Valencian Country to work in a local collective. She found a teaching position in Tavernes de la Valldigna, and lived in the town's Avenir collective throughout the final months of the war. She described collective life as like being in a big, devoted family. In October 1938, the Valencian branch of the Mujeres Libres delegated her to attend a congress of the libertarian movement in Barcelona; she and the rest of the Mujeres Libres delegation secretly boarded a British ship in Alacant and embarked for Barcelona, but their arrival was delayed by the fascist bombing of the port. However, their delegation was largely excluded from participation in the congress, which limited them to sessions regarding "auxiliary organizations of the libertarian movement". The following month, she attended a memorial to Buenaventura Durruti in Xàtiva and participated in a women's conference in Valencia.

=== Clandestinity and exile ===
After the Nationalist victory in the Spanish Civil War, she found herself unable to flee the country. She instead went into hiding and joined the opposition to Francoism. After hiding out for two years, she returned to Barcelona to live with her family. She later studied for her Baccalaureate, and provided prisoner support to anarchists who had been imprisoned by the Francoist dictatorship. After surviving the repressions of the first Francoist period, she emigrated to Canada in 1959 along with her daughter. She settled in Windsor, Ontario, where she reunited with her partner Federico.

There she learned the English language and worked as a nurse. She maintained contact with other Mujeres Libres members, including Soledad Estorach and Mercè Comaposada (who were based in Paris) and Sara Berenguer (in Occitania), and helped to edit the organization's publications. She also supported feminist and pacifist groups in Canada. She took courses at the University of Windsor and spent her free time making pressed flower art. According to the Fifth Estate, her flower art won several awards and was often given out and displayed at local community events.

Through Ahrne Thorne, she was introduced to the historian Martha Ackelsberg, who interviewed her for the book Free Women of Spain in December 1984. She also read Ackelsberg's manuscript and helped her edit the book. However, she died before being able to read the book in her native language. Pura Arcos died on 12 October 1995.

== Bibliography ==
- Ackelsberg, Martha A. (2005) [1991]. Free Women of Spain: Anarchism and the Struggle for the Emancipation of Women. Oakland, California: AK Press. ISBN 1-902593-96-0. LCCN 2003113040. OCLC 63382446.
- "Pura Arcos, 1919-1995". Fifth Estate (347). 1996. ISSN 0015-0800.
- Kashdan, Sylvie (1996). "The Spanish Revolution, Pura & Federico Arcos, & the Fifth Estate". Fifth Estate (395). ISSN 0015-0800.
- Marin Silvestre, Dolors (4 October 2010). "Pura Pérez Benavent". Diccionari Biogràfic de Dones (in Catalan).
