= Maruja (given name) =

Maruja is a Spanish given name, a diminutive form of the baptismal name María.

== People with the name ==
- Maruja Bustamante (born 1978), Argentine actress and playwright
- Maruja Callaved (1928–2018), Spanish television director
- Maruja Carrasco (1944–2018), Spanish botanist and academic
- Maruja Chacón Pacheco, Costa Rican politician
- Maruja Clavier (1934–2015), Venezuelan nuclear oncologist
- Maruja Fuentes (1978–2010), Puerto Rican architect and designer
- Maruja Grifell (1907–1968), Mexican actress
- Maruja Hinestrosa (1914–2002), Colombian pianist and composer
- Maruja Lara (1917–2003), Spanish anarcha-feminist and syndicalist
- Maruja Mallo (1902–1995), Spanish painter
- Maruja Montes (1930–1993), Brazilian-Argentine actress and vedette
- Maruja Pachón Castro (born 1948), Colombian kidnapping victim and Minister for Education
- Maruja Pereyra (1906–?), Afro-Uruguayan journalist and feminist activist
- Maruja Pibernat (fl. 1934–2004), Spanish-Argentine film and radio actress
- Maruja Torres (born 1943), Spanish writer and journalist
- Maruja Troncoso Ortega (born 1937), Spanish singer and professor

== Fictional characters ==
- Maruja, a Filipino comic book character created by Mars Ravelo
- Tola y Maruja, a Colombian cross-dressing comedy duo

== See also ==
- Maruja (band)
- Maruxa
