= Castile =

Castile, Castille or Castilla may refer to:

== Places ==
=== Spain ===
- Castile (historical region), a vaguely defined historical region of Spain covering most of Castile and León, all of the Community of Madrid and most of Castilla–La Mancha
- Kingdom of Castile, one of the medieval kingdoms of the Iberian peninsula, 1065–1230
- Crown of Castile, a medieval state in the Iberian Peninsula that formed in 1230
- Two regions of the Kingdom of Spain (until 1982):
  - Old Castile, in the north
  - New Castile (Spain), in the south
- Two contemporary autonomous communities of Spain:
  - Castile and León, in the north
  - Castilla–La Mancha, in the south

=== Elsewhere ===
- Castile, New York
- Castile (village), New York
- Castilla District, Piura Province, Peru
- Castilla de Oro, name given by Spanish in 16th century to Central American territories
- Governorate of New Castile, modern Peru
- Castilla, Sorsogon, municipality in Sorsogon, Philippines
- Castilla, Buenos Aires, Argentina

== Other uses ==
- Castile (surname)
- Castilians, inhabitants of the historical region of Castile, Spain
- Castilla (Vino de la Tierra), Spanish name for wines in Castile-La Mancha
- Castilia (butterfly), genus of brush-footed butterflies
- Castilla (plant), genus of rubber trees
- Castile soap, made with olive oil from the Castile region of Spain
- Auberge de Castille, the office of the Prime Minister of Malta
- Real Madrid Castilla, the reserve team of Real Madrid
- The Castiles, first group to include Bruce Springsteen
- Castille, a fictional character in Phantom Brave
- Spanish ship Castilla, any of 12 ships from the Spanish Navy
- Honduran ship Castilla, torpedoed by German submarine U-107 during World War II
- Kastilà, Tagalog word for the Spaniards in the Philippines

== See also ==
- Castell (disambiguation)
- Castella (disambiguation)
- Castelli (disambiguation)
- Castello (disambiguation)
- Castells (disambiguation)
- Castiel (disambiguation)
- Castilian (disambiguation)
- Castillo (disambiguation)
- New Castile (disambiguation)
