= San Pietro =

San Pietro is Italian for Saint Peter – see also Saint Peter (disambiguation).

It may also refer to:

== Battles ==
- Battle of San Pietro, fought in 1734
- Battle of San Pietro Infine, fought in 1943
- The Battle of San Pietro, 1945 film directed by John Huston

== Churches ==
- St. Peter's Basilica (Basilica di San Pietro in Vaticano)
- Old St. Peter's Basilica (Antica basilica di San Pietro in Vaticano)
- San Pietro di Castello (church), Venice
- San Pietro in Montorio
- San Pietro a Grado
- San Pietro, Erice
- San Pietro, Perugia
- San Pietro in Vincoli

== Places ==
Italy

- San Pietro Island, off the coast of southwestern Sardinia, Italy
- San Pietro di Castello (island)
- Baratili San Pietro, in the province of Oristano
- Castel San Pietro Romano, in the Metropolitan City of Rome
- Castel San Pietro Terme, in the province of Bologna
- Ponte San Pietro, in the province of Bergamo
- San Pietro a Maida, in the province of Catanzaro
- San Pietro al Natisone, in the province of Udine
- San Pietro al Tanagro, in the province of Salerno
- San Pietro Apostolo, in the province of Catanzaro
- San Pietro Avellana, in the province of Isernia
- San Pietro, Bisenti, in the province of Teramo
- San Pietro Clarenza, in the province of Catania
- San Pietro di Cadore, in the province of Belluno
- San Pietro di Caridà, in the province of Reggio Calabria
- San Pietro di Feletto, in the province of Treviso
- San Pietro di Morubio, in the province of Verona
- San Pietro in Amantea, in the province of Cosenza
- San Pietro in Cariano, in the province of Verona
- San Pietro in Casale, in the province of Bologna
- San Pietro in Cerro, in the province of Piacenza
- San Pietro in Gu, in the province of Padua
- San Pietro in Guarano, in the province of Cosenza
- San Pietro in Lama, in the province of Lecce
- San Pietro Infine, in the province of Caserta
- San Pietro Mosezzo, in the province of Novara
- San Pietro Mussolino, in the province of Vicenza
- San Pietro Val Lemina, in the Metropolitan City of Turin
- San Pietro Vernotico, in the province of Brindisi
- San Pietro Viminario, in the province of Padua
- Settimo San Pietro, in the Province of Cagliari
- San Pietro (creek), in the Province of Imperia

Switzerland

- Castel San Pietro, in the canton of Ticino

== Ships ==
- San Pietro

== Other uses ==
- Imperium: Saint Peter, a 2005 Italian TV film about St Peter, originally titled San Pietro

== See also ==
- Castel San Pietro (disambiguation)
- Santo Pietro, a village in Sicily
