= Castel =

Castel may refer to the following places:

== In France ==
Castel is the Occitan word for the Latin Castrum (small caserna military castrum) and occurs very often in southern France toponyms especially mixed with the adjective nau (which means new written nòu in Occitan).

- Castel, Somme, a village and former commune in Picardy, since 1965 part of Moreuil
- Belcastel (disambiguation), Great Castle
- Castelnaudary, Newcastle of Arry
- Castelnau-le-Lez, Newcastle upon Lez
- Castelsagrat, Holy castle
- Castelsarrasin, Sarracen castle

== In Italy ==
Castel, a short form of castello (castle), is a very common component in Italian place names, including:

- Castel Baronia, in the province of Avellino
- Castel Boglione, in the province of Asti
- Castel Bolognese, in the province of Ravenna
- Castel Campagnano, in the province of Caserta
- Castel Castagna, in the province of Teramo
- Castel Colonna, in the province of Ancona
- Castel Condino, in the province of Trento
- Castel d'Aiano, in the province of Bologna
- Castel d'Ario, in the province of Mantua
- Castel d'Azzano, in the province of Verona
- Castel del Giudice, in the province of Isernia
- Castel del Monte, in the province of L'Aquila
- Castel del Piano, in the province of Grosseto
- Castel del Rio, in the province of Bologna
- Castel di Casio, in the province of Bologna
- Castel di Ieri, in the province of L'Aquila
- Castel di Judica, in the province of Catania
- Castel di Lama, in the province of Ascoli Piceno
- Castel di Lucio, in the province of Messina
- Castel di Sangro, in the province of L'Aquila
- Castel di Sasso, in the province of Caserta
- Castel di Tora, in the province of Rieti
- Castel Focognano, in the province of Arezzo
- Castel Frentano, in the province of Chieti
- Castel Gabbiano, in the province of Cremona
- Castel Gandolfo, in the province of Rome
- Castel Giorgio, in the province of Terni
- Castel Goffredo, in the province of Mantua
- Castel Guelfo di Bologna, in the province of Bologna
- Castel Madama, in the province of Rome
- Castel Maggiore, in the province of Bologna
- Castel Mella, in the province of Brescia
- Castel Morrone, in the province of Caserta
- Castel Ritaldi, in the province of Perugia
- Castel Rocchero, in the province of Asti
- Castel Rozzone, in the province of Bergamo
- Castel Ruggero, in the province of Salerno
- Castel San Giorgio, in the province of Salerno
- Castel San Giovanni, in the province of Piacenza
- Castel San Lorenzo, in the province of Salerno
- Castel San Niccolò, in the province of Arezzo
- Castel San Pietro Romano, in the province of Rome
- Castel San Pietro Terme, in the province of Bologna
- Castel San Vincenzo, in the province of Isernia
- Castel Sant'Angelo, in the province of Rieti
- Castel Sant'Elia, in the province of Viterbo
- Castel Viscardo, in the province of Terni
- Castel Vittorio, in the province of Imperia
- Castel Volturno, in the province of Caserta

== In Spain ==
- Castel de Cabra, a town in the province of Teruel, Aragón

== In Guernsey ==
- Castel, Guernsey, one of the parishes of Guernsey

== In Canada ==
- Castel Bay, a bay in Northwest Territories

== In Israel ==
- Castel National Park

== Other uses ==
- Castel Group, a French beverage company

== See also ==
- Castells, human towers traditionally built during festivals in many places in Catalonia
- Castell (disambiguation), meaning "castle" both in Welsh and Catalan
- Castells (disambiguation), a Catalan surname and the plural form of Castell (Castle)
- Castle
- Castillo (disambiguation)
- Castel San Pietro (disambiguation)
