= Octavio Alberola =

Spanish physicist and anti-Francoist (1928–2025)

- Born: Octavi Alberola Suriñach; 4 March 1928; Alaior, Menorca, Spain
- Died: 24 July 2025 (aged 97); Perpinyà, Northern Catalonia, France
- Education: National Autonomous University of Mexico
- Organisations: National Confederation of Labour; Libertarian Youth; Defensa Interior; First of May Group
- Known for: Kidnapping of Marcos Ussia
- Movement: Anarchism, anti-Francoism
- Opponent: Francoist Spain
- Father: Josep Alberola Navarro

Octavio Alberola Suriñach (4 March 1928 – 24 July 2025) was a Spanish physicist and anti-Francoist activist. Forced into exile as a child, he became interested in physics and anarchism, seeing the two as interlinked. After growing up, he moved to France, where he became involved in militant activism. In 1962, he attempted to assassinate Francisco Franco, and in 1966, he kidnapped Spanish diplomat Marcos Ussia. He remained in France for the rest of his life, even after the Spanish transition to democracy.

== Life and career ==
Octavio Alberola Suriñach was born in Menorca in 1928, the son of the Catalan rationalist schoolteacher Josep Alberola Navarro. In 1933, the family moved to the Aragonese town of Fraga, where a young Octavio Alberola witnessed the Spanish Revolution of 1936. At the end of the Spanish Civil War, Alberola and his family were forced into exile in Mexico. Through other Spanish anarchist exiles, Alberola was introduced to the works of Peter Kropotkin and Élisée Reclus, who inspired him to study physics at university. He believed physics and anarchism were interlinked, stating that society was a stage of evolution. He came to view humans as "intelligent water", or as matter made conscious from the water created by the Big Bang.

During his years in Mexico, he collaborated on the publications of the National Confederation of Labour (CNT) and met Fidel Castro and Che Guevara, then still planning their guerrilla insurgency. In 1957, he moved to France and joined the Libertarian Youth. He was part of a new generation of anarchist activists who had grown up in exile and were radicalised into taking direct action against the Francoist dictatorship.

Alberola joined the anarchist militant group Defensa Interior, within which he carried out symbolic attacks against the dictatorship and collaborated with the Algerian independence movement. In 1962, he unsuccessfully attempted to assassinate Francisco Franco. He later joined the First of May Group, within which he participated in the kidnapping of Spanish diplomat Marcos Ussia in Rome in May 1966. The kidnapping was inspired by the earlier kidnapping of Isu Elías by Italian anarchists, and had the aim of securing the commutation of the death penalty for Catalan anarchist Jordi Conill. The Francoist government commuted the sentence and Alberola released Ussia unharmed. Although a militant at a time of rising left-wing terrorism, Alberola rejected the anarchist use of violence, believing it to be senseless.

Even after the death of Franco in 1975 and the subsequent Spanish transition to democracy, Alberola decided to remain in France, unlike many of the other Spanish anarchists who returned to the country. He nevertheless continued to contribute to the anarchist movement's publications, and in 2019, he wrote an open letter to prime minister Pedro Sánchez demanding respect for anti-Francoist fighters in recognition of the Historical Memory Law.

Alberola died in Perpinyà, Northern Catalonia on 24 July 2025, at the age of 97.

== Selected works ==
Articles

- "Venezuelan anarchists see Noam Chomsky as Chavez’s Clown" (Fifth Estate, #383, Summer, 2010)
- "Cuba: The Economy Changes" (Fifth Estate, #409, Summer, 2021)

Obituaries

- "Salvador Gurucharri aka Salva, Comrade and Friend (Revista Polémica, 2014)
- "David Graeber and Anarchism" (Rojo y Negro, 2020)
- "Goodbye to Stuart Christie" (Rojo y Negro, 2020)

Books

- Spain 1962: The Third Wave of the Struggle Against Franco (Kate Sharpley Library, 1993, ISBN 9781873605509, OL 19620660M)
- Revolutionary activism: the Spanish resistance in context (Kate Sharpley Library, 2000, ISBN 9781873605776, OL 8653920M)
