= Julia Hermosilla =

Spanish anarchist (1916–2009)

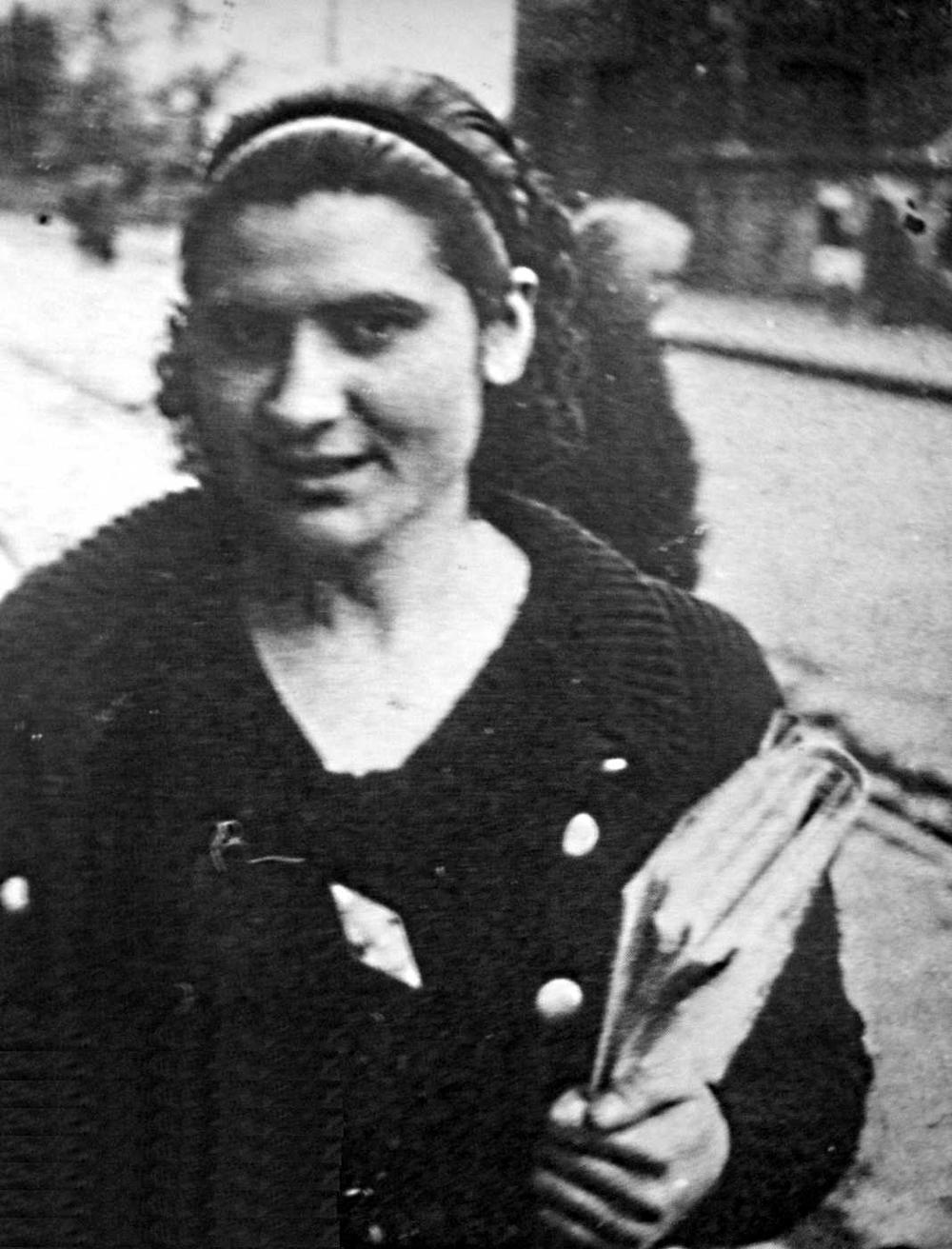
- Hermosilla, c. 1930
- Born: Julia Hermosilla Sagredo; 1 April 1916; Sestao, Basque Country, Spain
- Died: 10 January 2009 (aged 92); Baiona, Basque Country, France
- Spouse: Ángel Aransáez
- Children: 1
- Military career
- Allegiance: Spanish Republic (1936–1939); Free France (1940–1944); Spanish Republican government in exile (1945–1977)
- Service: Confederal militias (1936–1937); Spanish Republican Army (1937–1939); French Resistance (1940–1944); Spanish Resistance (1945–1961); Interior Defense (1961–1965)
- Service years: 1936–1965
- Conflicts: Spanish Civil War; War in the North; World War II; Opposition to Francoism
- Memorials: Mount Artxanda

Julia Hermosilla Sagredo (1 April 1916 – 10 January 2009) was a Spanish anarchist activist and resistance fighter. She joined the National Confederation of Labour (CNT) at a young age and participated in the anarchist insurrection of December 1933 and the Revolution of 1934. During the Spanish Civil War, she fought in the confederal militias on the northern front, where she lost her hearing during a bombardment. After the war, she joined the French Resistance and then the opposition to Francoism, participating in two assassination attempts against Francisco Franco.

== Biography ==
=== Early life ===
Julia Hermosilla was born on 1 April 1916 in the Basque town of Sestao. At the age of 14, she joined the National Confederation of Labour (CNT), an anarchist trade union federation, and helped to distribute the organisation's publications. Her father Juan had himself been a member. She also joined the local branch of the Libertarian Youth. Hermosilla participated in the anarchist insurrection of December 1933, and helped insurgents from La Rioja to escape over the border into France. During the Revolution of 1934, she helped the Aransáez family. She began a relationship with Ángel Aransáez, with whom she collaborated on anarchist activism.

=== Civil War ===
At the outbreak of the Spanish Civil War in 1936, she enlisted in the confederal militias. She was assigned a mission to rescue Isaac Puente from behind enemy lines, but she was ultimately unsuccessful; Puente was arrested and executed. Hermosilla was wounded during a Nationalist bombardment of Otxandio, which ruptured her eardrums, causing her to lose her hearing in both ears. She was later able to recover part of her hearing, but remained affected by the wound for the rest of her life. In 1937, she became an actress and joined a CNT art group in Santurtzi.

During the Battle of Bilbao, she and her family fled aboard a ship to France. Although the French authorities initially denied them entry, due to their left-wing background, they were able to stay there for two months before making their way to Catalonia to continue supporting the war effort. There she reunited with her partner, with whom she had a daughter. She spent the rest of the war working in a factory for the Spanish Republican Army. In February 1939, the Nationalists' Catalonia Offensive forced Hermosilla and her family to flee again to France. According to Hermosilla, 18 members of her family were murdered by the Nationalists in Treviana.

=== Exile and clandestine activism ===
In France, she was moved through various internment camps, before reuniting with her family in La Sala. After the Nazi invasion of France in 1940, she joined the French Resistance in Buzy, where she helped refugees escape Nazi persecution. Following the liberation of France, she and her family moved to Baiona near the Spanish border, where she aided refugees fleeing Francoist Spain to France. She regularly attended meetings of CNT groups in France, even after the death of her partner, and acted as a liaison with clandestine groups in Spain. When the CNT split over the issue of collaboration with the Spanish Republican government in exile, Hermosilla joined the faction that favoured a strategic alliance with the socialists and communists.

Hermosilla often returned to Spain on secret missions. In 1960 or 1961, CNT general secretary Roque Santamaría dispatched her to Madrid to deliver documents to two anarchist comrades; the two were later arrested and executed by garrote in August 1963. She also participated in two failed plots to assassinate Francisco Franco. During the first attempt to assassinate him from a plane, she watched the attempt play out from a boat near Spanish waters. The second attempt was carried out by the militant group Interior Defense, which she joined. In 1962, she carried out reconnaissance at the Ayete Palace in Donostia, looking for the best place to hide a bomb. At a meeting with Cipriano Mera and Joan Garcia Oliver in her home in Baiona, she selected the location for the attempt. She also regularly corresponded with Sara Berenguer, sending her letters about her activities and writing her poetry.

On 18 June 2006, she and other members of the Basque anti-Francoist resistance were honoured with a memorial on Mount Artxanda. Hermosilla died in Baiona on 10 January 2009, at the age of 93.

== Bibliography ==
- Berenguer, Sara; Alberola, Octavio (27 March 2014). "Hermosilla, Julia". Memoria Libertaria (in Spanish).
- Espílez Murciano, Felipe (7 March 2021). "Julia Hermosilla "Paquita"". Encima de la Niebla (in Spanish). ISSN 2695-5245.
- Imanol (22 May 2020). "La paradoja de ser antimilitarista y combatir en tres guerras". El Salto (in Spanish).
- Íñiguez, Miguel (2001). "Hermosilla Sagredo, Julia". Esbozo de una enciclopedia histórica del anarquismo español (in Spanish). Madrid: Fundación de Estudios Libertarios Anselmo Lorenzo. p. 295. ISBN 9788486864453. OCLC 807322760.
