= Castell (disambiguation) =

Castell (Eastern Catalan: [kəsˈteʎ], Welsh: [ˈkastɛɬ]) means 'Castle' both in Catalan and Welsh.

Castell may also refer to:

== Places ==
=== Germany ===
- Castell, Bavaria, a town in the district of Kitzingen, Bavaria, Germany
- County of Castell, a former county of northern Bavaria, Germany

=== Spain ===
- Es Castell, in Minorca, Spain
- Castell-Platja d'Aro, municipality in Baix Empordà
- Castell de Cabres, municipality in Baix Maestrat
- Castell de Castells, municipality in Marina Alta
- El Castell de Guadalest, or simply Guadalest, municipality in Marina Baixa
- Castell de l'Areny, municipality in Berguedà
- Castell de Mur, municipality in Pallars Jussà

=== United States ===
- Castell, Texas, a small community

=== Wales ===
- Castell, Denbighshire, a village

== Other uses ==
- Castell (surname)
- Castell, a human tower built at festivals in Catalonia and the Valencian Community
- Castell's sign, a medical sign assessed to evaluate splenomegaly and typically part of an abdominal examination
- Castell, a fictional planet in the Star Wars franchise

== See also ==
- Castel (disambiguation)
- Castella (disambiguation)
- Castelli (disambiguation)
- Castello (disambiguation)
- Castells (disambiguation)
- Castile (disambiguation)
- Castillo (disambiguation)
- Castle (disambiguation)
