= Hermosilla =

Hermosilla is a Spanish surname. Notable people with the surname include:

- Edmundo Hermosilla (born 1956), Chilean politician
- Ireneo Hermosilla (1928–2003), Paraguayan footballer
- Julia Hermosilla (1916–2009), Basque activist and resistance fighter
- Miguel Hermosilla (1948–2019), Chilean footballer and manager

== See also ==
- José Mamerto Gómez Hermosilla (1771–1837), Spanish Hellenist, journalist and writer
- Estadio Luis Valenzuela Hermosilla, a multi-use stadium in Copiapó, Chile
