= Maruja Lara =

Spanish anarcha-feminist and syndicalist

- Born: Angustias Lara Sánchez; 11 September 1917; Granada, Spain
- Died: 2003 (aged 85–86); Valencia, Spain
- Occupations: Cleaner, nurse
- Organization: Confederación Nacional del Trabajo
- Movement: Anarchism in Spain

Angustias Lara Sánchez (1917–2003), commonly known as Maruja Lara, was a Spanish anarcha-feminist and syndicalist.

== Biography ==
Angustias Lara Sánchez was born in Granada, on 11 September 1917. When she was six years old, she emigrated with her family to Brazil and then to Argentina. When the Second Spanish Republic was proclaimed, they returned to Granada. At the age of 14, she joined the Libertarian Youth and the Confederación Nacional del Trabajo (CNT), later becoming secretary of the CNT's Cleaning Union.

Following the outbreak of the Spanish Civil War, in September 1936, she fled Granada and for a time she fought as a militiawoman in the Maroto Column. She arrived in Valencia in 1937, where she settled and joined the Nurses' Union; she went to work in hospital number 1, located near the Torres de Quart. She held the position of treasurer and work secretary in the Regional Committee of the Mujeres Libres, located in Calle de la Paz. Among her companions and friends were militants such as Amelia Torres, Lucía Sánchez Saornil, Suceso Portales, Carmen Pons, but she was especially friendly with Isabel Mesa. When the war ended in March 1939, Maruja Lara and Isabel Mesa boarded a lorry to go to Almería and embarked for Algeria, but they ended up in the port of Alicante and were transferred to the Albatera concentration camp. She was able to escape from the concentration camp and flee to Granada, but she found nowhere to stay and was forced to return to Valencia. From there she left for Mallorca, went on to Barcelona and then back to Valencia.

Together with Isabel Mesa, they set up a kiosk in Valencia where they hid underground newspapers, such as Solidaridad Obrera and Fragua Social. In 1942 the friends, together with other libertarian comrades, set up the Unión de Mujeres Demócratas (UMD), a clandestine organisation to help prisoners and show solidarity with their families. During the transition to democracy, she participated in various libertarian collectives such as Libre Estudio, the CNT Pensioners' Federation, Ràdio Klara and the Ateneu Llibertari Al Marge. For their work during the Francoist dictatorship, in 1996, the Valencian CNT paid homage to Maruja Lara and Isabel Mesa.

Lara died in Valencia in 2003.
