= Castilian =

Castilian or Castillian may refer to:

- Castile, a historic region of the Iberian peninsula
  - Castilian people, an ethnic group from Castile
  - Castilian languages, a branch of the West Iberian languages consisting of all linguistic varieties descended from Old Latin
    - Spanish language, a Romance language that originated in Castile
      - Castilian Spanish, a variety of Peninsular Spanish spoken in Spain
  - Crown of Castile, a former state on the Iberian Peninsula
  - Kingdom of Castile, a former kingdom on the Iberian Peninsula
  - Castile and León, an autonomous community of Spain
  - Castile–La Mancha, an autonomous community of Spain
- SS Castilian, steamer ships
- The Castilian, a 1963 film
- Castilian War, a war between several sultanates and the Spanish Empire.

== See also ==
- Castile (disambiguation)
- Nationalities of Spain (disambiguation)
