= Castellón =

Castellón (Catalan: Castelló) may refer to:

== Places ==
- Castellón de la Plana, the capital city of the province of Castellón, in Valencian Community, Spain
- Province of Castellón, a province in Valencian Community, Spain
- Castelló, Valencia, formerly Castelló de la Ribera
- Castelló d'Empúries
- Castelló de Farfanya
- Castelló de Rugat

== Sports ==
- CD Castellón, a Spanish football team
- AB Castelló, a Spanish basketball team

== People with the surname ==
- Julia Castelló (born 1990), Spanish swimmer
- Núria Castelló (born 1971), Spanish swimmer
- Pedro Álvarez Castelló (1967–2004), Cuban artist
- Blanca Castellón (born 1958), Nicaraguan poet
- Jorge Castellón (born 1969), Bolivian sprinter
- José Rizo Castellón (born 1944), Nicaraguan politician
- Facundo Hurtado Castellón (born 1950), Bolivian politician and journalist
- Federico Castellón (1914–1971), American painter and illustrator
- Francisco Castellón (1815–1855), president of "Democratic" Nicaragua during the 1854–1856 civil war
- Gabriel Castellón (born 1993), Chilean footballer
- Francisco Javier Castellón (born 1960), Mexican politician
- Ninoska Pérez Castellón (born 1950), Cuban-American media personality
- Vladimir Castellón (born 1989), Bolivian footballer

== See also ==
- Castello (disambiguation)
