= Castells =

Castells (Eastern Catalan: [kəsˈteʎs]) is a Catalan name, the plural form of Castell (castle). It may refer to:

- Castells (surname)
- The Castells, American early 1960s pop band
- Castells, the Catalan tradition of building human towers

== See also ==
- Castel (disambiguation)
- Castell (disambiguation)
- Castella (disambiguation)
- Castelli (disambiguation)
- Castello (disambiguation)
- Castells (disambiguation)
- Castile (disambiguation)
