= Castelli =

Castelli may refer to:

== Places ==
=== Argentina ===
- Castelli, Buenos Aires, city in Buenos Aires Province
- Castelli Partido, partido in Buenos Aires Province
- Juan José Castelli, Chaco, in Chaco Province
- Villa Castelli, Argentina, in La Rioja Province
- Villa Castelli helicopter collision

=== Italy ===
- Castelli, Abruzzo, in the province of Teramo
- Castelli Calepio, in the province of Bergamo
- Castelli Romani, in the province of Rome
- Villa Castelli, in the province of Brindisi

== Other uses ==
- Castelli (surname)
- Castelli (brand), an Italian cycling clothing manufacturer
- Castelli (grape), another name for the Italian wine grape Trebbiano

== See also ==
- Castel (disambiguation)
- Castella (disambiguation)
- Castello (disambiguation)
- Castells (disambiguation)
- Castile (disambiguation)
- Castillo (disambiguation)
- Castle (disambiguation)
- Kastelli (disambiguation)
