= Federico Arcos =

Spanish political activist (1920–2015)

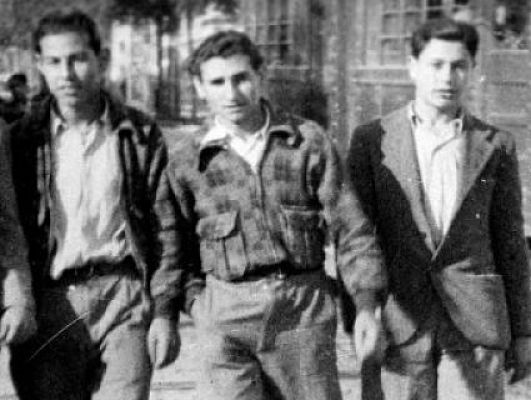
- Arcos (right) with Abel Paz and Liberto Sarrau in the 1930s
- Born: Federico Arcos Martinez; 18 July 1920; El Clot, Barcelona, Spain
- Died: 26 May 2015 (aged 94); Windsor, Ontario, Canada
- Occupations: Activist; Labour organizer; Tool and die maker
- Spouse: Purificación Pérez Benavent (died 1995)
- Children: 1

Federico Arcos Martinez (18 July 1920 – 26 May 2015) was a Spanish anarchist who fought in the Spanish Civil War and was later a labour organizer in Windsor, Ontario, Canada.

== Biography ==
Arcos was born in the El Clot neighbourhood of Barcelona, Spain, on 18 July 1920, the son of Manuela Martínez Moreno and Santos Arcos Sánchez, both peasants.

At the age of 14 he joined the anarcho-syndicalist trade union confederation the Confederación Nacional del Trabajo (CNT). With the onset of the Spanish Civil War in 1936 he joined the Juventudes Libertarias (FIJL), an anarchist youth organisation, and volunteered to fight but was initially deemed too young. He was co-editor of an anarchist youth paper, El Quixote. In April 1938 he was assigned to the front near Andorra.

When the Spanish Republic was finally defeated in 1939 Arcos fled to southern France and was imprisoned at a series of internment camps. In 1941 he escaped and took a job in Toulouse as a tool and die maker. In 1943, with the area now under Nazi occupation, Arcos escaped France and returned to Spain. In Spain he was arrested and pressed into the military, being sent to Ceuta in North Africa for two years. In 1945 he was released and returned to Barcelona where he joined the anti-Franco anarchist resistance.

In May 1952 he emigrated to Canada and until his retirement, in 1986, he worked in Windsor, Ontario as a tool and die maker for the Ford Motor Company. He was a rank-and-file trade unionist and was active in the Detroit anarchist scene. He was involved with the publisher Black & Red and the magazine Fifth Estate. In 1976 he published a book of poetry. Arcos was interviewed for the 1997 documentary Living Utopia about the Spanish Revolution. Arcos collected over 10,000 books and materials chronicling the anarchist movement, which he donated to the National Library of Catalonia in 2010.

Arcos died 26 May 2015 in Windsor aged 94.

== Publications ==
- Arcos, Federico (1972). Leon Nicolayevich Tolstoi: Ensayo Biográfico (in Spanish). Calgary: La Escuela Moderna.
- ——————— (1976). Momentos: Compendio Poético (in Spanish). Detroit: Black & Red.

== See also ==
- Anarchism in Spain

== Bibliography ==
- Anon. (Winter 2016). "Obituary: Federico Arcos". Anarcho-Syndicalist Review. No. 66. pp. 3–4. ProQuest 1765136696.
- Avrich, Paul (1995). "Federico Arcos". Anarchist Voices: An Oral History of Anarchism in America. Princeton University Press. pp. 400–407. ISBN 978-0-691-03412-6 – via Internet Archive.
- Watson, David (Summer 2015). "A Stalwart of the Spanish Revolution Passes: Federico Arcos". Fifth Estate. No. 394. p. 9 – via Internet Archive.
- Watson, David (15 October 2019). "Federico Arcos (1920–2015): An Iberian Anarchist Exile". In Castaneda, Christopher J.; Feu, Montse (eds.). Writing Revolution: Hispanic Anarchism in the United States. University of Illinois Press. pp. 258–276. doi:10.5622/illinois/9780252042744.003.0016. ISBN 978-0-252-04274-4 – via Oxford Academic.
