= Isabel Mesa Delgado =

- Born: 30 December 1913; Ronda, Spain
- Died: 25 February 2002 (aged 88); Huerta de Valencia, Spain
- Other name: Carmen Delgado Palomares
- Citizenship: Spain
- Occupation: Syndicalist

Isabel Mesa Delgado (30 December 1913 in Ronda – 25 February 2002 in Huerta) was a Spanish trade unionist, anarchist and Spanish anarcha-feminist worker. While in hiding, she used the pseudonym Carmen Delgado Palomares.

He was born into a working-class family of anarchist tradition. She was very proud of this, saying "I am daughter, granddaughter and great-granddaughter of anarchists". She was a relative of the typographer and prominent socialist internationalist José Mesa Leompart. When she was 11, she started working as a seamstress and, in 1928, when she was a 14-year-old, she moved with her family to Ceuta. There she joined the Sindicato de Actividades Diversas de la Federación Local ceutí of CNT where, as a woman, integrating was not easy, and of the city, taking charge of the library.

Mesa participated in the creation of the Gremio de la Aguja of CNET, obtaining the card number 1. Her trade union activity was mainly directed to the organization of working women. During a strike at Almadraba de Ceuta, where the company hired Maghrebi women for half the salary of the Spanish women, she assisted them in joining the union in order to get better conditions for all. According to Mesa, "they joined us and in 24 hours we won the fight". In 1934, during a season and until his expulsion, she played in of the Tetuán that operated while being disguised as an Esperantist society. In 1936, again in Ceuta, she came into contact with the founding group of Mujeres Libres magazine.

In Ceuta and Tetuán the Francoist coup of 16 July 1936 was successful. The repression was very strong and there were many executions by firing squad. Mesa helped many comrades to flee and managed to escape to the peninsula, arriving in Málaga in a fishing boat along with twelve men. In 1937, Mesa reached Valencia where she started a nursing course and then worked in the city and in Gandía. She participated in the constitution congress of the Federación Nacional de Mujeres Libres and became the general secretary of the local group of Valencia, assisting Lucía Sánchez Saornil, Pura Pérez Benavent, Amelia Torres Maeso and other compatriots in sharing their message. He was his representative in the National Committee of the CNT and in the Plenary of Solidaridad Internacional Antifascista (SIA) which was held in August 1938 in Valencia.

"The woman has always had to fight a lot, not only had to sow the ideas but to fight against some of those who were with us sowing. The woman and the man have to go walking together, seeking freedom, elbow to elbow or holding hands."

— Isabel Mesa Delgado

The last days of the war, in March 1939, Mesa fled to the port of Alicante. When ships did not arrive with aid in support of Republicans, Mesa fled to Almería on foot. With a false name, she became involved with the anti-Franco struggle. In Málaga, in 1941 she created, together with other colleagues, the underground newspaper, El Faro de Málaga. Discovered by the Francoist police, Carmen Delgado Palomares, the name that appeared on his identity document from that moment and until the end of her life, Mesa managed to avoid prison and death, and fled again to Valencia. Her alter ego, Isabel Mesa, was prosecuted for rebellion and sentenced to two death sentences.

Back in Valencia, in 1942, she promoted the creation of the collective Unión de Mujeres Demócratas, a clandestine organization dedicated to helping prisoners and other political activities.

Mesa set up a kiosk with his fellow anarchist Angustias Lara (Maruja Lara), a friend since 1937, and in the backroom of a cafe, they distributed an anarchist publication. In 1956, she was arrested and for eight days was in police station. During the transition, she collaborated in the formation of groups libertarians like Libre Estudio, la Federación de Pensionistas de la CNT, Ràdio Klara and the Al Margen. She was a member of Mujeres Libres and the Fundación Salvador Seguí. She was later recognized by Confederación General del Trabajo (CGT) for her work.

Her idea of what anarchism is defined his whole life:

Anarchism is a wonderful path, but very rough. But you have to follow it. And once you are in it you can not let it go, it envelops you, it makes you drunk ... Anarchism is love, freedom, equality, humanity of all conditions. Neither borders, nor color, nor races, nor flags! ... In anarchism there is nothing but humanity, human feelings, we aspire to everything, to the maximum that can be reached ...

— Isabel Mesa Delgado

Mesa died in Valencia on 25 February 2002. At her funeral, A las barricadas was played and she was interred wrapped in the confederal flag.
