= Defensa Interior =

Anti-Franco militant anarchist group in 1960s Spain

Internal Defence
- Defensa Interior
- Dates active: 2 September 1961–1965
- Country: Spain
- Ideology: Anarchism
- Political position: Far-left
- Part of: Spanish Libertarian Movement

Defensa Interior (English: Internal Defence; DI) was an anarchist militant organisation, founded in September 1961 by the congress of the Spanish Libertarian Movement (MLE). It carried out a series of bombing attacks in Spain over the early 1960s, before being disbanded by the MLE in 1965.

== Background ==
In the wake of World War II, members of the exiled Spanish Libertarian Movement (MLE) underwent a radicalisation process, with many opting to carry out an insurrection against the Francoist dictatorship. The Spanish anarchist diaspora established a Comisión de Defensa to coordinate militant action, recruit insurgents and smuggle weapons and explosives across the France–Spain border. However, the Comisión faced difficulties carrying out its operations, due to insufficient funding and internecine conflicts within the anarchist movement. At this time, exiled anarchist organisations sought to keep the armed groups under close supervision, disavowing any independent action (such as that of the Movimiento Libertario de Resistencia) and sometimes even cutting off funding.

== Establishment ==
By 1960, the split that had divided the Spanish anarchist movement since World War II was resolved and the MLE called a congress in Limoges to reunify the movement. In August–September 1961, this congress reunified the old Confederación Nacional del Trabajo (CNT). On 2 September, a secret session of the congress resolved to establish a separate organisation to carry out direct action against the Francoist dictatorship in Spain, resulting in the formation of Defensa Interior (English: Internal Defence; DI). With the blessing of the MLE, the group provided a means for a new generation of Spanish anarchists to engage in a clandestine struggle against the dictatorship.

DI was formally controlled by a commission made up of exiled members of the CNT, Iberian Anarchist Federation (FAI) and Libertarian Youth (FIJL), but in practice the organisation was operated by a small group of FIJL members. The anarchist youth had become disillusioned with the inaction of the older generation, although they were also dependent on the CNT and FAI due to a lack of funds to carry out insurgent action independently. Through their contacts with the Spanish Maquis, they also gained experience in liaising between anarchists inside and outside Spain, as well as in forging documentation to cross the border. The involvement of anarchists in Spain provided legitimacy for the activities of the DI, with members of the FIJL receiving delegations from young anarchists in Spain to coordinate armed actions in the country.

== Attacks ==
In 1962, Defensa Interior began carrying out a series of armed attacks inside Spain, many of which were symbolic in nature and targeted property rather than specific people. In the summer of 1962, DI carried out bombings in the cities of Barcelona, Madrid and Valencia; in the latter case, on 15 July 1962, they detonated a bomb on the balcony of Valencia City Hall. On 12 August 1962, Defensa Interior carried out an attack against the Valley of the Fallen, which was considered to be a physical manifestation of the Francoist regime. The group detonated a bomb in the central nave of the basilica, causing damage to some of the pews. They claimed responsibility for the bombing with a statement, declaring: "Franco: ni en tu tumba te dejaremos descansar tranquilo" (English: "Franco: not even in your grave will we let you rest in peace"). On 19 August 1962, they detonated a bomb outside the Ayete Palace, the summer residence of Francisco Franco, although the delayed arrival of Franco prevented DI from using the bomb to target the dictator himself.

Through their attacks on regime property, the DI hoped to raised awareness about political repression in Spain and to solicit international solidarity for the anti-Francoist movement. Anarchist groups in other countries responded: in September 1962, the Italian Giovanile Libertario kidnapped the Spanish vice consul in Milan and passed on information they extracted from him to the DI; members of the DI in Paris also recruited the Scottish anarchist Stuart Christie into their ranks. They also sought to damage the regime's attempts to develop the Spanish tourism industry; in the spring of 1963, DI sabotaged a number of Spanish planes that were set to carry tourists to Spain.

Despite their focus on attacks against property rather than people, DI attacks caused casualties on two occasions. On 29 July 1963, DI planted a bomb at the passport office of the General Directorate of Security (DGS) in Madrid. They detonated the bomb when 100 people, including both state officials and citizens, were in the room; 31 of whom were wounded.

== Dissolution ==
In October 1963, a congress of the CNT in Toulouse resulted in a change in leadership in the organisation. The new leaders were more susceptible to threats of political repression and sought to preserve the legality of the CNT in France; they thus decided to wind down the activities of the DI.

Following the return of the previous generation of leadership to the International Secretariat of the MLE, the activities of the DI were brought to an end and the organisation was shut down in 1965. Some young members of the DI continued to engage in armed action, justifying the move by citing a clause of the DI's founding document, which provided room for autonomous action if the DI's activities were "sabotaged" by other anarchist organisations. Militants of the FIJL reorganised their activities into the First of May Group, which continued to carry out attacks against the Francoist regime over the course of the late 1960s and early 1970s.

== See also ==
- Anarchism in Spain
- Julia Hermosilla
- Stuart Christie

== Bibliography ==
- Delso, Rodrigo; Amann, Atxu; Soriano, Federico (2018). "Time, Architecture and Domination: The Valley of the Fallen". Heritage & Society. 11 (2): 126–150. doi:10.1080/2159032X.2019.1670534.
- Evans, Danny (2019). "Uprooted cosmopolitans? The post-war exile of Spanish anarchists in Venezuela, 1945-1965". Journal of Iberian and Latin American Studies. 25 (2): 321–342. doi:10.1080/14701847.2019.1632037.
- Fernández Soldevilla, Gaizka (2024). "1974. The year in which Western Europe was the epicenter of terrorism" (PDF). Revista Internacional de Estudios sobre Terrorismo (11): 7–24. ISSN 2660-9673.
- Romanos, Eduardo (2014). "Radicalization from Outside: The Role of the Anarchist Diaspora in Coordinating Armed Actions in Franco's Spain". In Bosia, Lorenzo; Demetriou, Chares; Malthaner, Stefan (eds.). Dynamics of Political Violence. Routledge. doi:10.4324/9781315578323-15 (inactive 6 July 2025). ISBN 9781315578323.
- Sheean, Jacqueline (2019). "Monument and Memory: The Valley of the Fallen and its Cultural Archive". Arizona Journal of Hispanic Cultural Studies. 23: 9–32. doi:10.1353/hcs.2019.0010.
- Téllez Solà, Antonio (2010). "The Libertarian movement in the fight against Franco (1962-1974): The Internal Defence agency (DI) and the Iberian Libertarian Youth Federation's (FIJL) First of May Group". Anarchist international action against Francoism from Genoa 1949 to The First Of May Group. Translated by Sharkey, Paul. Kate Sharpley Library. ISBN 9781873605851.
