= Sara Berenguer =

Catalan anarcho-syndicalist and anarcha-feminist writer and activist (1919–2010)

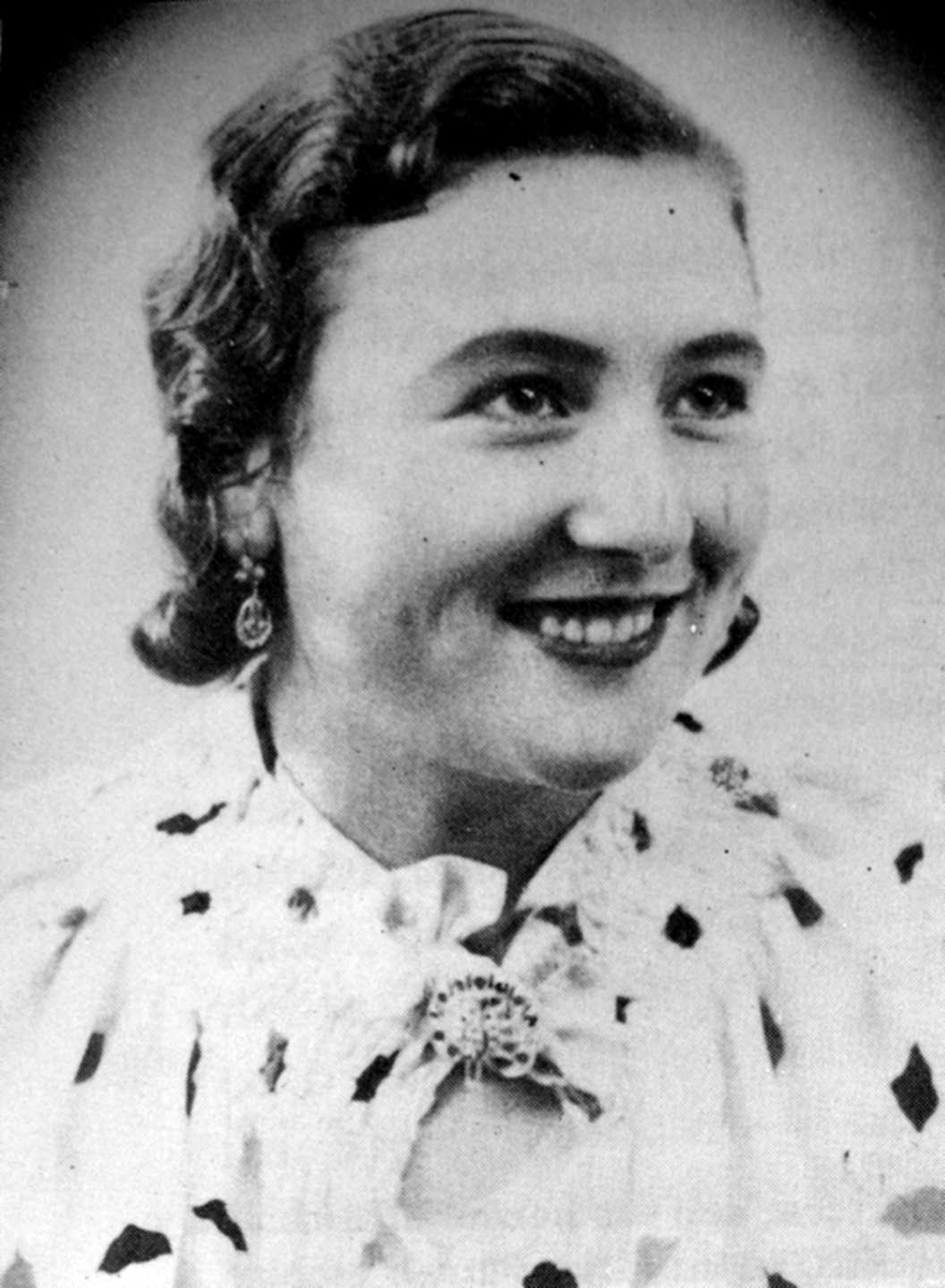
- Sara Berenguer (1940s)
- Born: 1 January 1919; Barcelona, Catalonia, Spain
- Died: 8 June 2010 (aged 91); Montady, Occitania, France
- Occupations: Writer, poet
- Years active: 1936–2010
- Organization: Mujeres Libres
- Movement: Anarcho-syndicalism, anarcha-feminism

Sara Berenguer Laosa (1 January 1919 – 8 June 2010) was a Catalan anarcho-syndicalist and anarcha-feminist writer, who was active in the Mujeres Libres movement.

== Biography ==
Sara Berenguer was born into a modest working-class family; her father was a bricklayer and a libertarian activist.

She left school at the age of 12. At thirteen, she began working in a butcher's shop, but revolted by the exploitation and machismo, she quit several jobs. She became a dressmaker and then worked in a workshop, before becoming self-employed until July 1936.

=== Civil War ===
Berenguer was 17 when the Spanish Revolution of 1936 broke out. Her father left to fight at the front and died there. She took part in the Revolutionary Committee of the Les Corts district until June 1937, and in the Revolutionary Committee of the timber union alongside Antonio Santamaria, for whom she worked as a mechanic and accountant. One day, she was placed in charge of arms distribution.

At the same time, she held positions of responsibility on the local committee of the Libertarian Youth (FIJL) and in the secretariat of the libertarian atheneum, where she was a teacher of street children. She met Sol Ferrer, the daughter of Francesc Ferrer, with whom she learned French.

During the May Days of 1937 in Barcelona, she took part in the armed confrontations against the Stalinists, defending the Casal (the house of working-class women) run by the libertarian activist Amparo Poch y Gascón. In the spring of 1938, she was appointed to the National Committee of Solidaridad Internacional Antifascista (SIA) and made numerous visits to the front.

In October 1938, she joined the Mujeres Libres movement, where she was in charge of the association's regional secretariat. There she fought against ignorance and worked to "educate women socially and culturally so that they can build and defend themselves as free and conscious human beings."

=== Exile ===
In January 1939, she fled into exile in France, where she continued her work for the SIA in Perpignan and then in Béziers, where she tried to rescue internees from the camps, including her companion Jesús Guillén Bertolín. During the Nazi occupation of France, she was a member of the CNT group in Bram and liaised with the French Resistance in Aude, Ariège, Hérault and Haute-Garonne. After the Liberation of France, with Jesus, she continued her work with the CNT-in-exile. In 1947, she was in charge of the stenography courses organised by the CNT for refugees and played an active part in the theatre groups organised by the libertarian movement. At that time, she was very close to anarchist activist groups, particularly around Octavio Alberola and Cipriano Mera. In 1965, she took part in the activities of the group that published the journal Frente Libertario.

From 1972 to 1976, together with Suceso Portales, she edited and published the magazine Mujeres Libres (47 issues from 1964 to 1976). Her house, near Béziers, remained a meeting place for libertarians. The film De toda la vida (All Our Lives) was shot there in 1986, starring Pepita Carpeña, Dolors Prat, Federica Montseny, Suceso Portales, Mercedes Comaposada and Conxa Perez.

In addition to Mujeres Libres, Sara Berenguer contributed to a large number of titles in the libertarian press and several poetry anthologies. She was also a contributor to the book Mujeres libres: luchadoras libertarias (published by FAL, 1999). After winning a number of prizes for her poetry, she died on 18 June 2010.

== Selected works ==
Books

- Berenguer, Sara (1988). Entre el sol y la tormenta: treinta y dos meses de guerra, 1936-1939 (in Spanish). Barcelona: Seuba. ISBN 9788486747107. OCLC 462218486.
- ———————— (2008). Mujeres de temple (in Spanish). Tavernes Blanques: L'Eixam. ISBN 9788496014770. OCLC 804404372.
- ———————— (2011). Femmes d'Espagne en lutte, le courage anonyme au quotidien de la guerre civile à l'exil (in French). Translated by Salvador Guillén, Carmen. Lyon: Atelier de création libertaire. ISBN 978-2-35104-046-1. OCLC 780276113.

Poetry

- ———————— (1992). El lenguaje de las flores (in Spanish). Barcelona: Amarantos. ISBN 9788479680237. OCLC 81489318.
- ———————— (2004). Sentiments (in Catalan). Vic: Emboscall. ISBN 9788496253711. OCLC 433333110.

Anthology

- ————————; Ruiz, Laura (2011). Free Women (Mujeres Libres): Voices and Memories for a Libertarian Future. Rotterdam: Sense. ISBN 9789460910883. OCLC 668182876.

== Bibliography ==
- Kietrys, Kyra A.; Linares, Montserrat (18 March 2009). Women in the Spanish Novel Today: Essays on the Reflection of Self in the Works of Three Generations. McFarland. ISBN 978-0-7864-5319-1.
- Lannon, Frances (6 June 2014). The Spanish Civil War: 1936–1939. Bloomsbury Publishing. ISBN 978-1-4728-1006-9.
- Lines, Lisa Margaret (2012). Milicianas: Women in Combat in the Spanish Civil War. Lexington Books. ISBN 978-0-7391-6492-1.
- Rausa, Jacinte (2000). Sara Berenguer (in French). Éditions du Monde libertaire. ISBN 9782903013721. OCLC 469562424.
