= Valencians =

Valencians (Valencian) Valencianos (Spanish)

Total population
- 4,185,000 (Spanish citizens) (for a total population of 5,216,018)

Regions with significant populations
- Valencian Community, Murcia (Carche)

Languages
- Valencian, Spanish and Valencian Sign Language

Religion
- Predominantly Roman Catholicism

Related ethnic groups
- Castilians, Balearics, Aragonese, Catalans, Occitans and other Romance-speaking peoples

Valencians (Valencian: valencians, (Note: Pronunciation of "valencians": Valencian: [valensiˈans]) Spanish: valencianos (Note: Pronunciation of "valencianos": Spanish: [balenˈθjanos])) are the native people of the Valencian Community, indigenous to eastern Spain. Since 2006, the Valencian people are officially recognised in the Valencian Statute of Autonomy as a nationality "within the unity of the Spanish nation". Valencians' native languages are Valencian, a Romance language also known as Catalan in about two-thirds of the territory, and Spanish in the rest; both languages are official.

The Valencian Community is politically divided in three provinces, from south to north: Alicante, Valencia and Castellón. Its capital is the city of Valencia.

== Historical background ==
In 1237, the Andalusi Taifa of Valencia was taken by king James I the Conqueror of the Crown of Aragon. The population of the new kingdom was by far mostly Muslim, so the crown started a campaign of repopulation of the lands with Christians, as usual in the Reconquista. The new Christian arrivals came from Catalonia and Aragon. Aragonese presence was most dominant in the interior parts of the kingdom (as can be assumed by geographical factors); those Aragonese from the eastern comarcas of Aragon (Matarranya, Casp, Baix Cinca, Llitera and Ribargorça) would have brought with them Catalan language varieties, whereas the rest of Aragonese settlers would've brought eastern Spanish and Aragonese varieties which would mix into Churro Spanish, which in much of the interior is the traditional language, as Valencian is in the coast, where most of the new inhabitants had Catalan or, less usual, Occitan origins.

The Vega Baja del Segura and Vinalopó comarcas/comarques were lands disputed between the crowns of Castile and Aragon since the Reconquista, this being because they were conquered by Aragon but reserved for Castile under a treaty, hence they were repopulated by people from both crowns at different times, and the Alt Vinalopó (Villena influence area) was actually part of Murcia (Albacete province) until the nineteenth century. Following the Black Death and later the Expulsion of the Moriscos, the then Valencian-speaking Bajo Segura (to which Orihuela and Torrevieja belong) is said to have been resettled mostly by people from Murcia, eventually defining the language border there (see Panocho dialect). The Requena comarca was, like the Alto Vinalopó, part of Castile (Cuenca province) until the mid-nineteenth century (1851).

Muslim presence in the Kingdom of Valencia was very high, making one third of the entire population at the time of the expulsion (the highest proportion in all of Spain). The coexistence between the Christian and Muslim was mostly good, despite some chapters of religious intolerance like the massive Baptism of Muslims during the first Revolt of the Brotherhoods; however, Valencian Muslims never ceased to speak Arabic. The Christian Valencian elites disapproved of King Philip's plans of Expulsion of the Moriscos in 1609, because the sudden lack of the traditional workforce would lead to the kingdom's ruin.

The Bourbon victory in the War of the Spanish Succession in the early 18th century led to the abolishment of Valencian laws and government institutions, and Valencian language was banned from legal and institutional use. The Kingdom of Valencia thus ceased to exist as an institution and, in the early 19th century, it was divided into three different provinces, although its inhabitants continued to self-identify as Valencian and maintained their language. After several failed attempts to re-gain self-government, the transition to democracy led to the devolution of Valencian traditional self-governing institutions and laws, chiefly the Generalitat Valenciana and the Statute of Autonomy. The Statute made Valencian official again along with Spanish, and defined Valencians as Spaniards inhabitants of the community.

== Demographics ==
The Valencian population traditionally concentrated in localities with fertile cultivation and growing lowlands by the most important rivers (Júcar, or Xúquer in Valencian, Turia, or Túria, Segura and Vinalopó), also in harbour cities important to the agricultural trade.

The most important population centres used to be, during the Roman times, Sagunto and Dénia; later on in history, Valencia (València), Alicante (Alacant), Xàtiva, Orihuela, Elche (Elx), Gandia, Villarreal (Vila-real) and, more recently, Alzira and Castellón de la Plana (Castelló de la Plana).

The population density which is higher in the central and southern lands and minor in the northern and inner ones, is derived from the traditional distribution of people which originated in the orographic characteristics of the Valencian lands and the possibility to obtain irrigated land agriculture. Demographics were also affected by (being perhaps the exception to the mentioned distribution) the great industrial activity and the commerce of agriculturally derived products during the 20th century of noncoastal cities like Alcoy (Alcoi), Elda, Ontinyent, Petrer, Villena, and La Vall d'Uixó.

In the last years, concentration in the great capitals and its metropolitan areas has augmented considerably (e.g. Torrent, Mislata, Paterna, Burjassot, Sant Vicent del Raspeig, etc.) especially in all the coastal cities and towns. Thus, traditionally small populations such as Benidorm or Torrevieja have undergone a considerable population increase (still more remarkable during summertime) due to the seasonal migration of tourists.

== Languages ==
Valencian-speaking areas in the Valencian Community, in green (lighter green: Catalan/Valencian outside the community).

Valencian and Spanish are the official languages of the Valencian Community. Spanish (or Castilian) is the official language of Spain, while Valencian, that is, the varieties of Catalan spoken in the Community, is the language considered by the Statute of Autonomy as llengua pròpia ("native language"). Valencian is traditionally spoken in the densely populated coastal areas rather than inland, where many places have Spanish as their traditional language, also those areas incorporated into the provinces of Alicante and Valencia at their creation in 1833 and which did not form part of the historical Kingdom of Valencia. Consequently, the 1984 Law on the "Use and Education of Valencian" defines certain municipalities as "predominantly Spanish-speaking", and allows them some few optional exceptions as to official use of Valencian, even though the right to use and to receive education in Valencian is guaranteed by the Statute of Autonomy (Art. 6.2) anywhere in Valencia.

== Cuisine ==
Paella is a rice dish which originated in Valencia near lake Albufera, a lagoon in eastern Spain. Valencians consider paella their main national dish.

Other famous Valencian dishes are the orxata drink, and the bunyols: the sweet pastry eaten in falles.

== See also ==
- List of Valencians
- Valencianism
- Catalan Countries (Catalan-speaking areas)
- Nationalities of Spain
