= New Castile =

New Castile may refer to:

- New Castile (Spain), Spanish historic region
- Governorate of New Castile, Spanish colony 1529–1542
- Luzon, Philippine island

== See also ==
- Castile (disambiguation)
