= El Cafetero =

Song
- Genre: Pasillo
- Songwriter: Maruja Hinestroza de Rosero

"El Cafetero" (translation: the coffee grower) is an instrumental song in the pasillo genre written by Maruja Hinestroza de Rosero.

Viva Music Colombia rated the song No. 24 on its list of the 100 most important Colombian songs of all time. In its list of the 50 best Colombian songs of all time, El Tiempo, Colombia's most widely circulated newspaper, ranked the version of the song by Jaime Llano González at No. 25.
