= Castells (surname) =

Castells is a Catalan surname. Notable people with the surname include:

- Ada Castells (born 1968), Catalan professor, writer and journalist
- Berta Castells (born 1984), Spanish hammer thrower
- Manuel Castells, Spanish sociologist
- Raúl Castells, Argentine leftist activist
- Toni Castells, Spanish composer
