= Castella (disambiguation) =

Castella is a type of Japanese sponge cake.

Castella or de Castella may also refer to:

== People ==
- Hubert de Castella (1825–1907), Swiss-Australian writer, artist and winemaker
- Jean-Edouard de Castella (1881–1966), Swiss painter and illustrator
- Lilly de Castella, winemaker
- Paul de Castella (1827–1903), Swiss-Australian grazier and winemaker
- Robert de Castella (born 1957), Australian former world champion marathon runner
- Russ Castella (born 1983), American record producer
- Svend Aage Castella (1890–1938), Danish amateur soccer player
- Castella (Martinho Joaquim Castella Quessongo), Angolan footballer

== Places ==
- Castella, California
- Castella, Lot-et-Garonne, France
- Castella, Victoria, Australia
- Castellau, Wales, has the alternative name of Castella

== Other ==
- Castella (grape), another name for the Italian wine grape Bombino bianco
- Castella, ancient Roman fortlets
- Conservatorio de Castella, arts institute in Costa Rica

== See also ==
- Castell (disambiguation)
- Castelli (disambiguation)
- Castello (disambiguation)
- Castells (disambiguation)
- Castile (disambiguation); Castella is the Catalan-language name of this region
