= Roberta Howett =

Irish singer (born 1981)

- Born: 26 September 1981 (age 44)
- Origin: Dublin, Ireland
- Genres: pop, soul
- Years active: 2004, 2010–present
- Website: RobertaHowett.com

Roberta Howett (born 26 September 1981 in Dublin, Ireland) is an Irish singer who was the first contestant eliminated in the first UK series of television talent show The X Factor in 2004.

== The X Factor: 2004 ==
Howett successfully auditioned for the first series of The X Factor in 2004 and made it to "bootcamp", "judges' houses" and the live shows, but was eliminated in the first live show.

Performances on The X Factor

- Last 9 - "Superstar" by The Carpenters (Eliminated)

== Solo career ==
In 2007, Howett sang on Toni Castells's debut album, Unharmed.

She announced on Irish Radio that she would release three singles in Ireland, before finally releasing her debut album. On Friday 26 February 2010, her debut single titled "Beautiful Lies" was finally released in Ireland. On Thursday 4 March 2010, Beautiful Lies became Howett's first Top 40 single debuting at Number #23 in the Irish Singles Chart.

In July 2011, Howett appeared as a backing singer for Niall Breslin.

== Discography ==
=== Singles ===
Year	Single	Chart positions	Album
Year	Single	IRE	Album
2010	"Beautiful Lies"	23	Non-album single
