= Castel San Pietro (disambiguation) =

Castel San Pietro is a municipality in the canton of Ticino, Switzerland.

Castel San Pietro may also refer to:

- Castel San Pietro Terme, city and comune in the Metropolitan City of Bologna, Emilia-Romagna, Italy
- Castel San Pietro Romano, municipality in the Metropolitan City of Rome in the Italian region of Latium, Italy

== See also ==
- San Pietro (disambiguation)
