= Castiel =

Castiel may refer to:

- Castiel (Supernatural), a character in the television series Supernatural
- Castiel, Switzerland, a former municipality of Switzerland
- Castiel, a Hebrew name meaning "my cover is God" or "shield of God" in theophory in the Bible

== See also ==
- Cassiel, an angel appearing in extracanonical Jewish, Christian, and Islamic mystical and magical works
- Castile (disambiguation)
