= SS Castilian =

SS Castilian is the name of the following ships:

- SS Castilian (1890), sunk by SM U-61 on 18 April 1917
- SS Castilian (1919), wrecked 12 February 1943

== See also ==
- Castilian (disambiguation)
