= Maruja Troncoso Ortega =

Spanish opera singer and educator

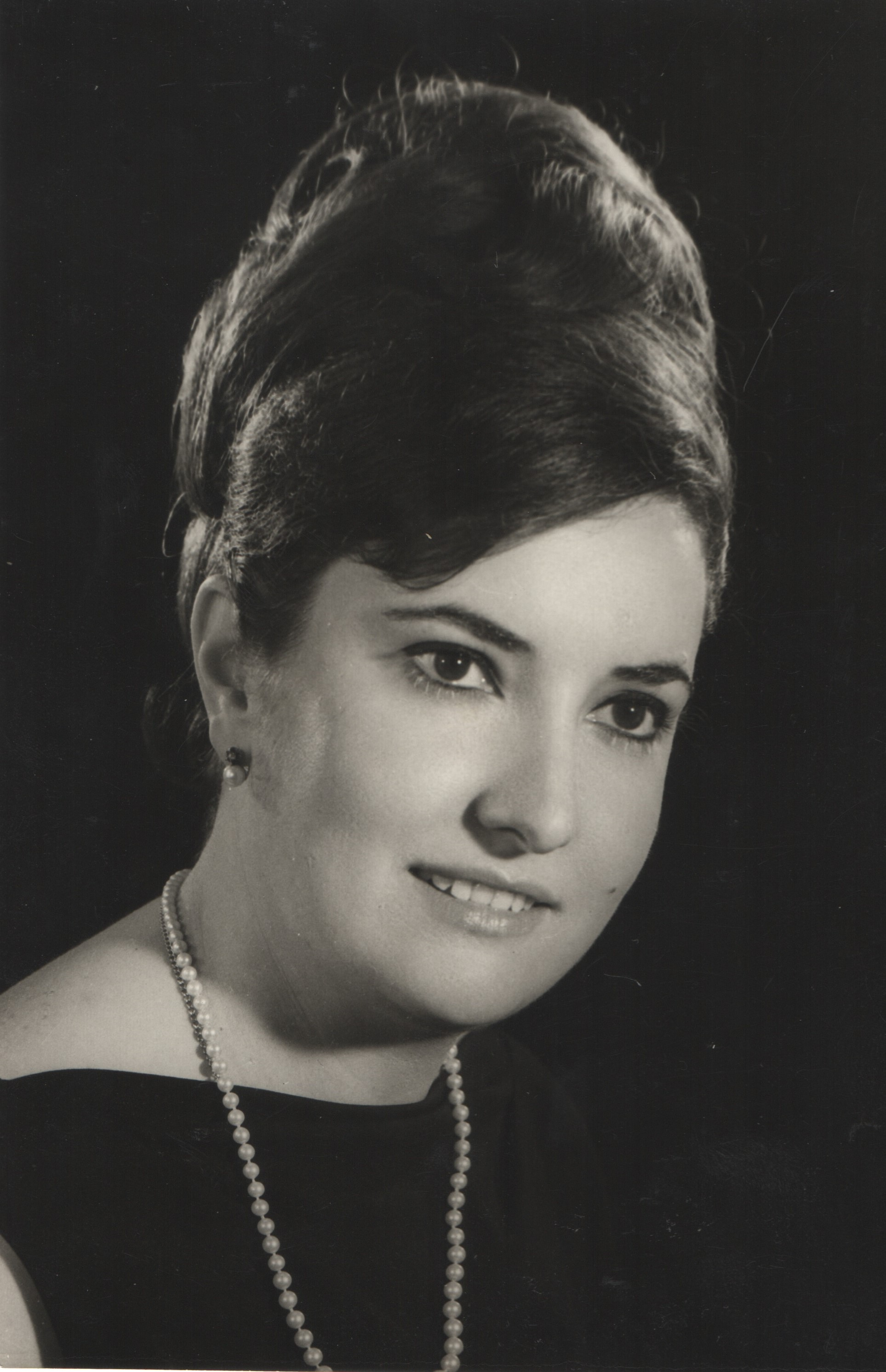
- Born: María Josefa Troncoso Ortega; 18 January 1937 (age 89); Jerez de la Frontera, Spain
- Education: Seville Higher Conservatory of Music
- Occupations: Singer, professor

Maruja Troncoso Ortega (born 18 January 1937) is a Spanish lyric soprano and professor of singing.

== Biography ==
Maruja Troncoso Ortega was born into a family with a close relationship to music. Her father, Claudio Troncoso, was a violinist and director of the Municipal Band of Arcos de la Frontera. From a young age she felt attracted to show business, becoming part of the Friends of Art Society of Jerez and acting in several amateur theater productions at the Teatro Villamarta in Jerez de la Frontera.

She studied violin with José Martínez Carmé and sang with Francisco Martín Soto, presenting herself as a free student for exams for the Middle Degree of violin and Superior Degree of singing at the Seville Higher Conservatory of Music, obtaining the Extraordinary End of Course Award in the specialty of singing.

Her debut as a singer was at the Jerez Orfeón, with whom she participated in numerous concerts: zarzuelas, sacred music, and some novelties such as Las tres Cantigas de Alfonso X el Sabio. She also appeared with the group Aficionados Líricos Reunidos, who performed every Sunday at the Teatro Villamarta, promoted by Agustín Brotón.

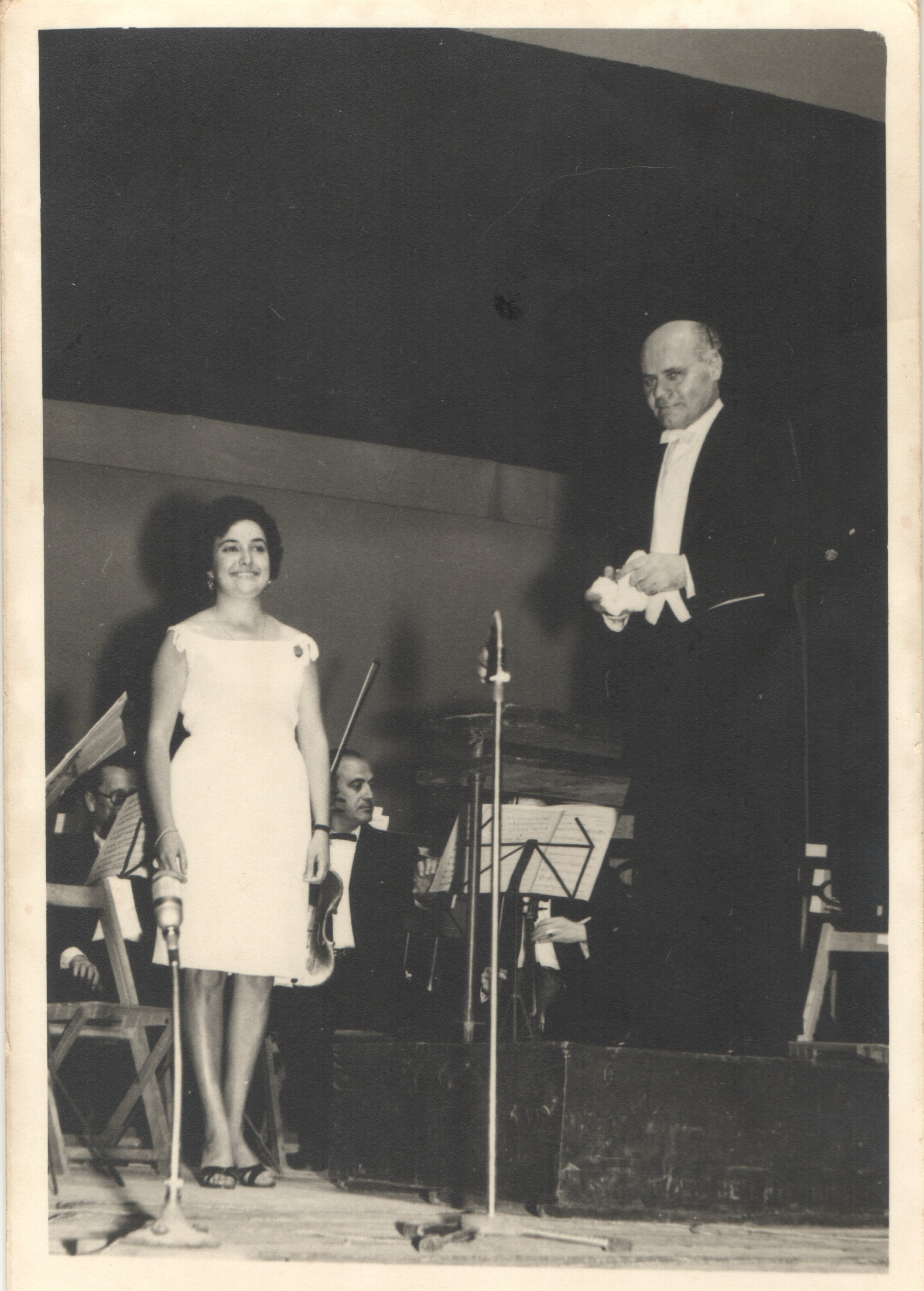
In concert, 7 July 1966

At 28, Troncoso moved to Madrid, looking for new horizons to develop her career, and continued studying with Miguel García Barroso. She responded to the public call for admission to the RTVE Choir, obtaining a place. There she had the opportunity to sing under the baton of Igor Markevitch, Nadia Boulanger, Odón Alonso, Ros Marbá, Rafael Frühbeck de Burgos, and García Asensi, among others. In 1967 she joined the Compañía Lírica Amadeo Vives, directed by José Tamayo, performing at Summer Festivals in Madrid, Barcelona, and Seville, with the Antología de la Zarzuela for several years. She was later part of the Compañía del Teatro de la Zarzuela de Madrid.

She obtained the position of professor of singing at the Conservatory of Seville in 1982, and was subsequently promoted to the chair. She has collaborated on the selection of the members of the Teatro Villamarta Choir in Jerez, where she taught a singing course.

She published a master lesson, La voz humana y el canto lírico (ISBN 9788493121327), in 2000.

She has been a member of the Royal San Dionisio Academy of Sciences, Arts, and Letters since 2001.

== Repertoire ==
=== Zarzuelas ===
- "La verbena de la Paloma"
- "La revoltosa"
- "La del manojo de Rosas"
- "La reina Mora"
- "Agua, azucarrillos y aguardiente"
- "Los gavilanes"
- "La viejecita"
- "La canción del olvido"
- "La corte de Faraón"
- "La Tabernera del Puerto"
- "Bohemios"
- "La Parranda"
- "Pan y Toros"
- "Luisa Fernanda"
- "El Caserío"

=== Operettas ===
- Die Fledermaus by Johann Strauss

== Notable students ==
- Rosa María de Alba, soprano
- Elisa Beltrán, soprano
- Rosario Hidalgo López, director of the Triarte Center for Artistic Studies
- Angel Hortas, musical director of the Cathedral of Jerez and organist
- Pilar Marchena, flamenco singer-songwriter
- Alicia Molina García, soprano
- Amanda Serna, soprano
- María del Valle Duque Vassal'lo
