= Castell (surname) =

Castell is a surname of English, French or Catalan origin. Notable people with the surname include:

- Adela Castell (1864–1926), Uruguayan educator, writer, and poet
- Alan Castell (1943–2024), English cricketer
- David Castell, American record producer, musician and recording engineer
- Edmund Castell (1606–1685), English orientalist
- John Castell (aka John Castle), 15th-century Master of University College, Oxford, and a Chancellor of the university
- Jordan Castell, American football player
- José María Castell (1896–1981), Spanish footballer
- Lacksley Castell (1962–1984), Jamaican reggae singer
- Lluc Castell (born 2006), Spanish footballer
- Patricia Castell (1926–2013), Argentine actress
- Sir William Castell (born 1947), British businessman
