= Treviana =

- Municipality
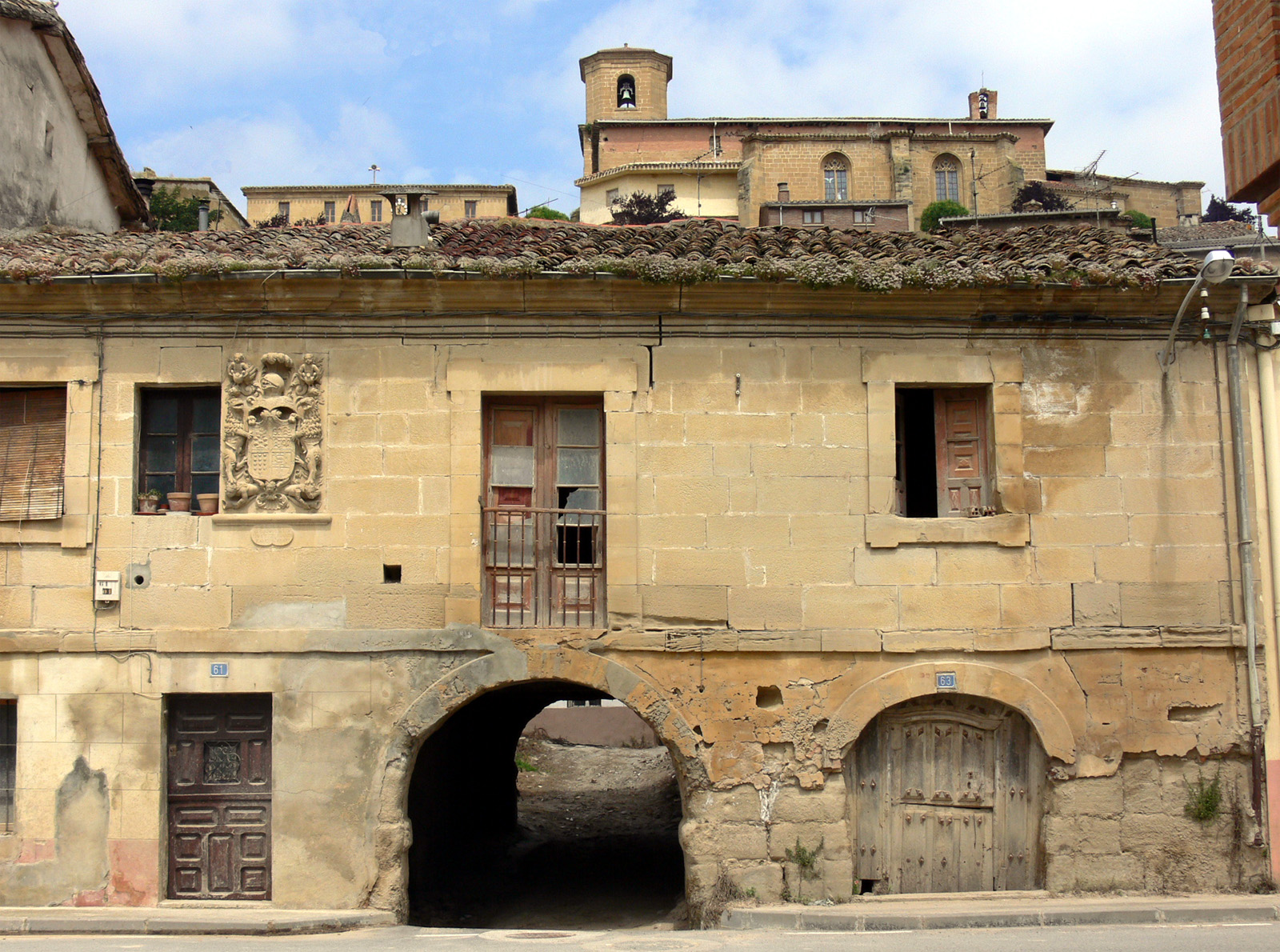
- View of Treviana

- Location within La Rioja, Spain Location within Spain
- Coordinates: 42°33′27″N 3°03′04″W
- Country: Spain
- Autonomous community: La Rioja
- Comarca: Haro

Government
  - Mayor: Antonina Cantabrana Medina (AIT)

Area
  - Total: 34.94 km^{2} (13.49 sq mi)
- Elevation: 597 m (1,959 ft)

Population (2025-01-01)
  - Total: 142
- Demonym(s): trevianés, sa
- Postal code: 26215
- Website: www.treviana.org

Treviana is a village in the province and autonomous community of La Rioja, Spain. The municipality covers an area of 34.94 square kilometres (13.49 sq mi) and as of 2011 had a population of 193 people.
