= Castello =

Castello may refer to:

== Places ==
=== Italy ===
- Castello, Venice, the largest of the six sestieri of Venice
- Città di Castello, a town in Umbria
- Castello, the old town center of Giudicato of Cagliari in Sardinia
- Castello, a neighbourhood in Florence
- Piazza Castello, a city square in Turin
- Residenza Il Castello, Fivizzano, Tuscany, a castle
- Villa di Castello, near Florence, country residence of Cosimo I de' Medici, Grand Duke of Tuscany (1519-1574)

=== Elsewhere ===
- Castello, Hong Kong, a private housing estate
- Cittadella (Gozo), also known as the Castello, a citadel in Gozo, Malta
- Subdivisions of San Marino, known as castelli (singular: castello) in Italian
- Castelló, Valencia, a town in the Valencian Community, Spain
- Short name of Castellón de la Plana, a city in the Valencian Community, Spain
- A locality in the town of Monteggio in Switzerland

== People ==
- Castello (surname), a list of people with the surname Castello or Castelló
- Castello Holford (1845–1905), American writer, best known for writing Aristopia, perhaps the first alternative history novel to be written in English
- Castello Lukeba (born 2002), French footballer

== Other uses ==
- Diocese of Castello, a former Roman Catholic diocese based in Venice
- Castello cheeses
- AB Castelló, a basketball team based in Castellón de la Plana, Spain
- Castello (film), a 2006 Malaysian Malay-language action crime film

== See also ==
- Castell (disambiguation)
- Castella (disambiguation)
- Castelli (disambiguation)
- Castellón (disambiguation)
- Castells (disambiguation)
