= Spanish ship Castilla =

Twelve Spanish ships of the Spanish Navy have borne the name Castilla, after the region of Castilla:

- Castilla (1628), patache in the Royal Navy of Flanders
- Spanish corvette Castilla (1728), corvette, 12 guns
- Spanish ship Castilla (1730), ship of the line, 62 guns, launched in 1729 in Guarnizo, commissioned on 11 January 1730, scrapped in 1736 in Havana
- Spanish ship Castilla (1738), ship of the line, 60 guns, launched in 1737 in Havana, sunk in Veracruz by a storm in 1751
- Spanish ship Castilla (1751), ship of the line, 64 guns, constructed in Guarnizo, sunk on 30 September 1769 by a storm near Veracruz
- Spanish ship Castilla (1780), ship of the line, 58 guns, constructed in Ferrol, prison ship for French in 1808, burned by French in 1810 in Cádiz
- Spanish ship Reino de Castilla, first steamship in the Spanish Navy, built at Ditchburn & Mare (London) in 1846, decommissioned in 1868
- Castilla (1842), formerly the Mexican Navy's Montezuma, a steam paddle frigate constructed at Green & Wigram (London) in 1842, purchased from Mexico in 1846, the first steamer to cross the Atlantic west-to-east, in 1848
- Spanish cruiser Castilla, Aragon-class unprotected cruiser commissioned in 1882 and sunk in the Battle of Manila Bay in 1898 during the Spanish–American War
- Castilla (TA-21), ex–USS Achernar (AKA-53), an attack cargo ship acquired in 1965 and scrapped in 1982
- Castilla (L-21), ex–USS Paul Revere (APA-248), an attack transport acquired in 1980, decommissioned in 1998, and scrapped in 2000
- Spanish ship Castilla (L52), a Galicia-class landing platform dock commissioned in 2000
