= Maruja Hinestrosa =

Colombian pianist and composer

- Born: María de la Cruz Hinestrosa Eraso; 16 November 1914; Pasto, Colombia
- Died: 9 January 2002 (aged 87)

María de la Cruz Hinestrosa Eraso (Note: In this Spanish name, the first or paternal surname is Hinestrosa and the second or maternal family name is Eraso.) (1914–2002), known as Maruja Hinestrosa (Note: Also spelled Hinestroza.) or Maruja Hinestrosa de Rosero, was a Colombian pianist and composer. She composed in a wide range of styles, and her song "El Cafetero" is particularly well-known.

== Biography ==
María de la Cruz Hinestrosa Eraso was born on 16 November 1914 in Pasto, in the Colombian department of Nariño. Her parents were Julia Eraso and Roberto Hinestrosa, and she had three siblings.

Hinestrosa started studying music theory, singing, and piano in Pasto under a Franciscan nun called Mother Bautista. Her first composition was the pasillo "El Cafetero", which she performed at a Congreso Nacional Cafetero in Pasto when she was 14; El Tiempo wrote that it ""quickly became the anthem of coffee producers". She went on to compose in a variety of traditional styles, and performed regularly across Colombia.

In 1992, Hinestrosa was awarded a Golden Lyre (Spanish: Lira de Oro) by SAYCO, the Colombian copyright collective. In her acceptance speech, she said "I am one of many music lovers, as are all the people of Nariño. It is with great pleasure that I receive [the award] on behalf of all musicians and composers, known and unknown."

Hinestrosa died on 11 January 2002.

== Musical style and compositions ==
Hinestrosa composed in a wide range of classical and traditional styles. Her pasillo "El Cafetero" is particularly well-known, and a version by Jaime Llano González was included in El Tiempo's list of the 50 greatest Colombian songs. In 1994 she composed "La Gran Fantasía Colombiana" together with Raúl Rosero Polo. Her waltz "Dulce Sueño" was the theme of a telenovela shown on Caracol. Her other notable works include:

- Ballads: "Pobre de Mí" and "Todos Llevamos una Cruz"
- Bambucos: "El Guarangal", "El Ingenio", and "La Molienda"
- Boleros: "Alma Mía", "Ciegamente", "Cruel Amargura", "Eco Lejano", "Navegando", and "Vuélveme a Querer"
- Pasillos: "Deportista", "Destellos", "Nuevo Amanecer", "Periquete", "Picardía", and "Yagarí"
- Tangos: "Amigo Mío", "Nos Dan las Doce", "Reproche", and "Vacío"
- Waltzes: "Las Tres de la Mañana" and "Valle de Atriz"
- Orchestral pieces: "Concierto en Si Menor"
- Piano pieces: "Bosquejos Húngaros", "Fantasía Española", "Fantasía Sobre Aires Colombianos", and "Saudade"
- Other: "Campeonísimo", "Gloria", "La Madre Mía", "Serenata Colombiana", "Arroyito Pampero", "Yagüarcocha", and "Mi Terruño"
