= Castile (surname) =

Castile or Castille is a surname. Notable people with the surname include:

- Castile:
  - Brooke Castile (born 1986), American pairs figure skater
  - Christopher Castile (born 1980), American actor
  - L. J. Castile (born 1987), American football player
  - Philando Castile (1983–2016), American man fatally shot by a police officer in St. Anthony, Minnesota
- Castille:
  - Hadley Castille (1933–2012), Cajun fiddler
  - Simeon Castille (born 1985), NFL cornerback

== See also ==
- Cora Amalia Castilla (born 1961), Mexican politician
- Emilio J. Castilla, Spanish academic
- Javier Castilla (born 1981), Colombian professional squash player
- María Carmen Castilla Álvarez (born 1968), Spanish politician
- Vinny Castilla (born 1967), Mexican professional baseball player
