= Kastelli =

Kastelli may refer to:

- Kastelli Hill, a landform at the city of Chania, Crete, Greece
- Kissamos (or Kastelli Kissamou), a settlement in the Chania regional unit, Crete, Greece
- Kastelli, Achaea, a subdivision of Kleitoria, Achaea regional unit, Crete, Greece
- Kastelli, Heraklion, a municipality in the Heraklion regional unit, Crete, Greece
- Kastelli Airport, a mixed-use public/military airport near Kastelli, Heraklion, Crete, Greece
- Kastelli Giant's Church, a prehistoric stone enclosure in Finland
