= Belcastel =

Belcastel is the name or part of the name of several communes in France:

- Belcastel, Aveyron, in the Aveyron département
- Belcastel, Tarn, in the Tarn département
- Belcastel-et-Buc, in the Aude département
