= Toni Castells =

Spanish composer

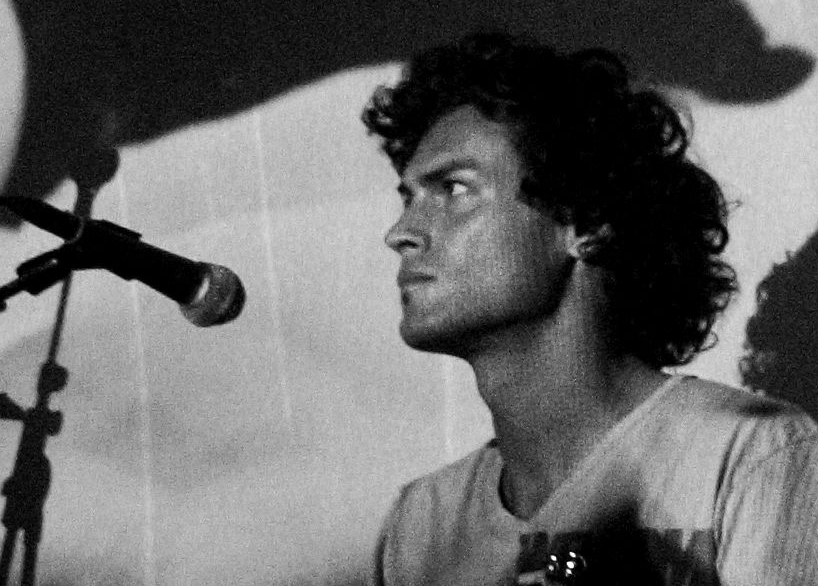
- Castells performing at Bush Hall, London

Background information
- Born: Berga
- Origin: Barcelona, Spain
- Genres: Post-Genre, Classical Crossover, New Age, Neo-classical, Ambient, Electronica, Video-Opera
- Occupations: Composer, producer, educator, environmentalist.
- Instruments: Piano, guitar, clarinet, electronics.
- Years active: 2006–present
- Labels: Sony Music Entertainment, Interstellar Music, Instant Attraction Records, Decca, AZ Records
- Website: www.tonicastells.com

Toni Castells (born in Berga, Spain) is a Spanish composer based in London. His work combines elements of classical music, opera, electronic music, and contemporary sound art, often drawing on genres such as neo-classical, ambient, and classical crossover. Castells has collaborated with various performers and has presented his compositions at venues in the United Kingdom and other places in Europe.

His musical style has drawn comparisons to a diverse range of artists. Ben Roberts of London Tourdates described it as "Massive Attack meets Mendelssohn", while producer Michael Haas described it as "Morricone meets Satie." The US label Magnatune characterised it as "Puccini meets Sigur Rós".

In addition to his musical career, Castells is a PhD candidate in biomedical engineering at the Polytechnic University of Catalonia, exploring the therapeutic potential of music. His research focuses on the effects of sound on heart rate variability and chronic stress. He lectures on Music Technology at the London College of Music and Imperial College London.

== Early Music Career ==
Castells began his musical education at the age of four. At six, he was identified as a child with high capacities, a detail featured in Maria Teresa Gomez Masdevall's academic book High Capacities in Boys and Girls: detection, identification and integration in school and family. He began studying classical guitar as his primary instrument at the same age and later taught himself piano. He also studied the clarinet. At the age of 14, Castells began studies at the Conservatori Municipal de Música de Barcelona. During this time, his experimental piece for flute and piano, Imatges, received third prize ex aequo at the St. Joan de Vilatorrada Composition Prize. In the same year, he co-founded a pop band with friends from his music school, initially named Korrefok and later renamed Herzia. The band was signed by the independent Spanish label AZ Records in 1998.

After completing his secondary education, Castells enrolled at La Salle University, where he completed a BSc and MSc in Electronic Engineering. One of his lecturers was Joan Trayter, founder of Music Lan recording studios in Avinyonet de Puigventós. Castells subsequently joined the studios as an engineer, where he worked for two years with a range of prominent Catalan and Spanish artists, including Jarabe de Palo, Enrique Bunbury, Peret, Andrés Calamaro, Macaco, Ojos de Brujo, Lluís Llach, Sopa de Cabra and Quimi Portet, among others. He also contributed to Unsterblich by the German punk rock band Die Toten Hosen.

=== London career and Momo ===
In 2000, Castells moved to London, where he worked as a recording and mixing engineer for José María Cano of the Spanish pop group Mecano. He contributed to Cano's debut solo album JoseCano (Muxxic 2000), recording and editing vocals and mixing the album. In 2002, he worked with Cano again on Hala Madrid!, the centenary anthem of Real Madrid CF, featuring Plácido Domingo and composed by Cano. From 2001 to 2006, Castells was an assistant recording engineer at the Royal College of Music, where he recorded the RCM Symphony Orchestra under conductors including Lorin Maazel, Bernard Haitink and Roger Norrington.

In 2004, Castells started Momo, a project combining popular music with classical influences. Its debut album, Unharmed, was released independently in October 2006 and featured soprano Amelia Whiteman, Spanish singer Beth (Spain’s representative at the 2003 Eurovision Song Contest), and Dublin-born singer Roberta Howett, a finalist in the first UK series of The X Factor (2004).

Castells first presented Unharmed live at the Roxy Bar & Screen in London on 12 June 2007, in a performance combining music, visuals, and poetry. The official premiere took place at Bush Hall, London, on 23 July 2007, in collaboration with the Sacconi Quartet and visual artist Conor Masterson. Between 2007 and 2009, the show was also performed in the United Kingdom and Spain, including at The Stables in Milton Keynes, FNAC in Barcelona, and the Mercat de Música Viva in Vic, as well as appearances at the Patronal Festival of Formentera, where he shared the bill with Maria del Mar Bonet and Manel.

=== Famous Jack ===
In 2009, Castells launched Famous Jack, a solo project influenced by post-punk, new wave and electro-psychedelic music. He performed on the London live circuit, appearing at venues such as The Dublin Castle, The Water Rats, The Troubadour, 93 Feet East, the Windmill Brixton, The Bull & Gate, and The Camden Head. Castells released two studio albums under the name Famous Jack: Famous Jack (2009) and Superstar (2011).

== The London Trilogy ==
The London Trilogy is a cycle of three large-scale works composed by Castells between 2012 and 2018. The trilogy is conceptually inspired by the Buddhist First Dharma Seal, the Law of Impermanence, which teaches that all phenomena in material existence are transient: everything has a beginning, a middle, and an end, and suffering arises from resistance to this principle. Castells has also cited the pre-Socratic philosopher Heraclitus as an influence, particularly his famous observation: “No man ever steps in the same river twice, for it is not the same river and he is not the same man.”

The trilogy explores three stages of the human life cycle: birth (expression), growth (experimentation), and death (integration / transcendence). Each work is written for a bespoke ensemble that combines acoustic instruments, electronics, solo voices, and choir, with each piece adopting a distinct instrumental configuration. Castells has described how he develops studio albums as preliminary sketches for these works, using them to refine the musical material before the staged performances.

The trilogy was not composed in chronological order. The first two works focus on birth (Life from Light, 2012) and death (2045: The Year Man Becomes Immortal, 2016), while the final piece, Hhumann X (2018), addresses the complexities of human growth and social connectedness.

=== Life from Light (2012) ===
Life from Light is a chamber video-opera that premiered at Union Chapel in London on November 15, 2012. It diverges from traditional operatic structure by adopting the form of an oratorio. The work incorporates multimedia and video art, showing the influence of Steve Reich's video-operas.

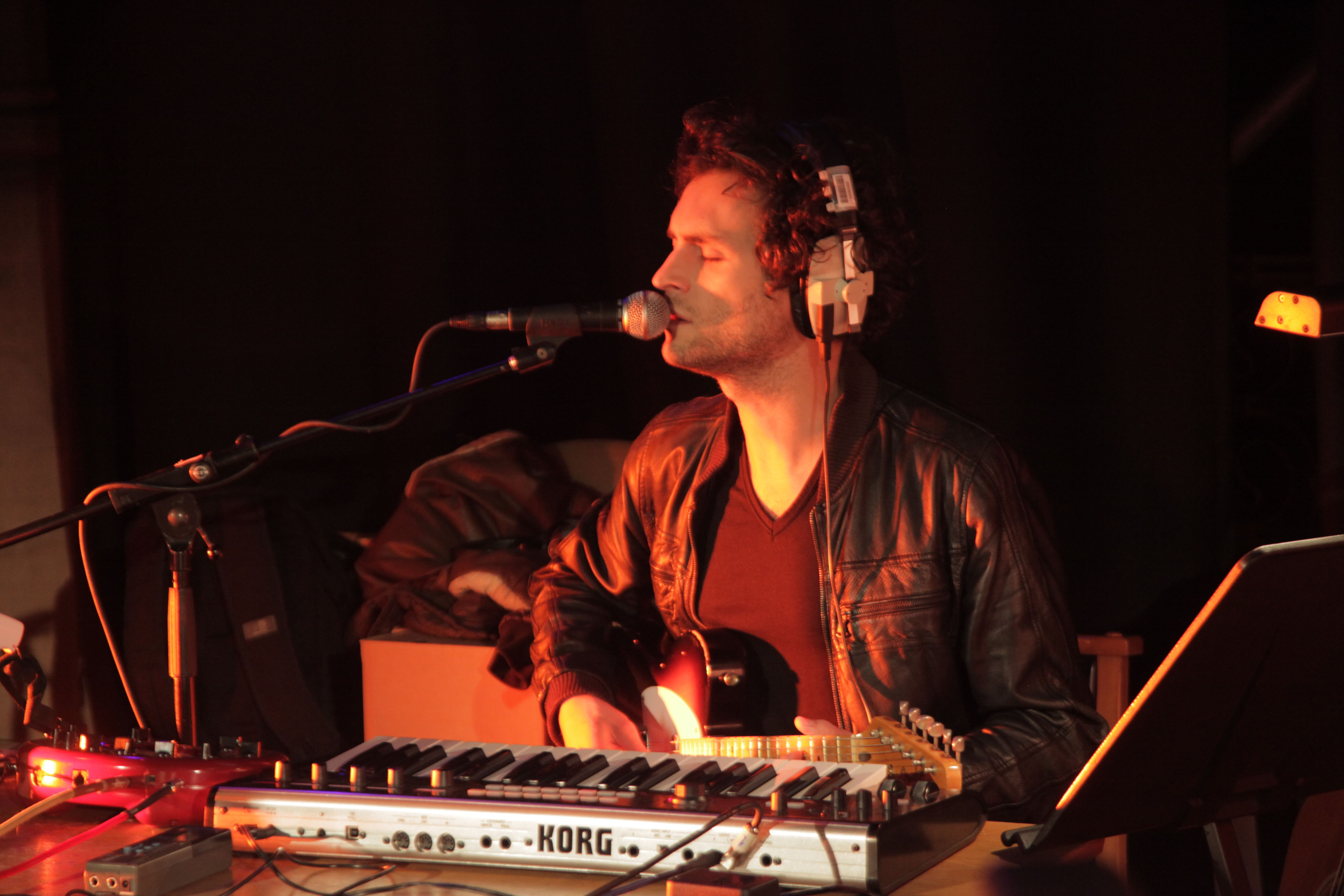
Toni Castells performing "Life from Light" at Union Chapel in London in 2012.

The concept for Life from Light was drawn from an episode of the same name in the BBC documentary series How To Grow A Planet, which examines the origins of life on Earth. The piece is structured around a quote from Charles Darwin concerning the impossibility of the universe arising from "blind chance or necessity," using this as a foundation to explore themes of human origin, humanity's relationship with nature, and ecological impact. A notable aspect of the work is its incorporation of explicit sexual content and text sourced verbatim from Wikipedia, elements intended to underscore the role of sexual reproduction in evolution. Some commentators have interpreted this as an effort to provide sex education and critique the trivialisation of sex in youth culture.

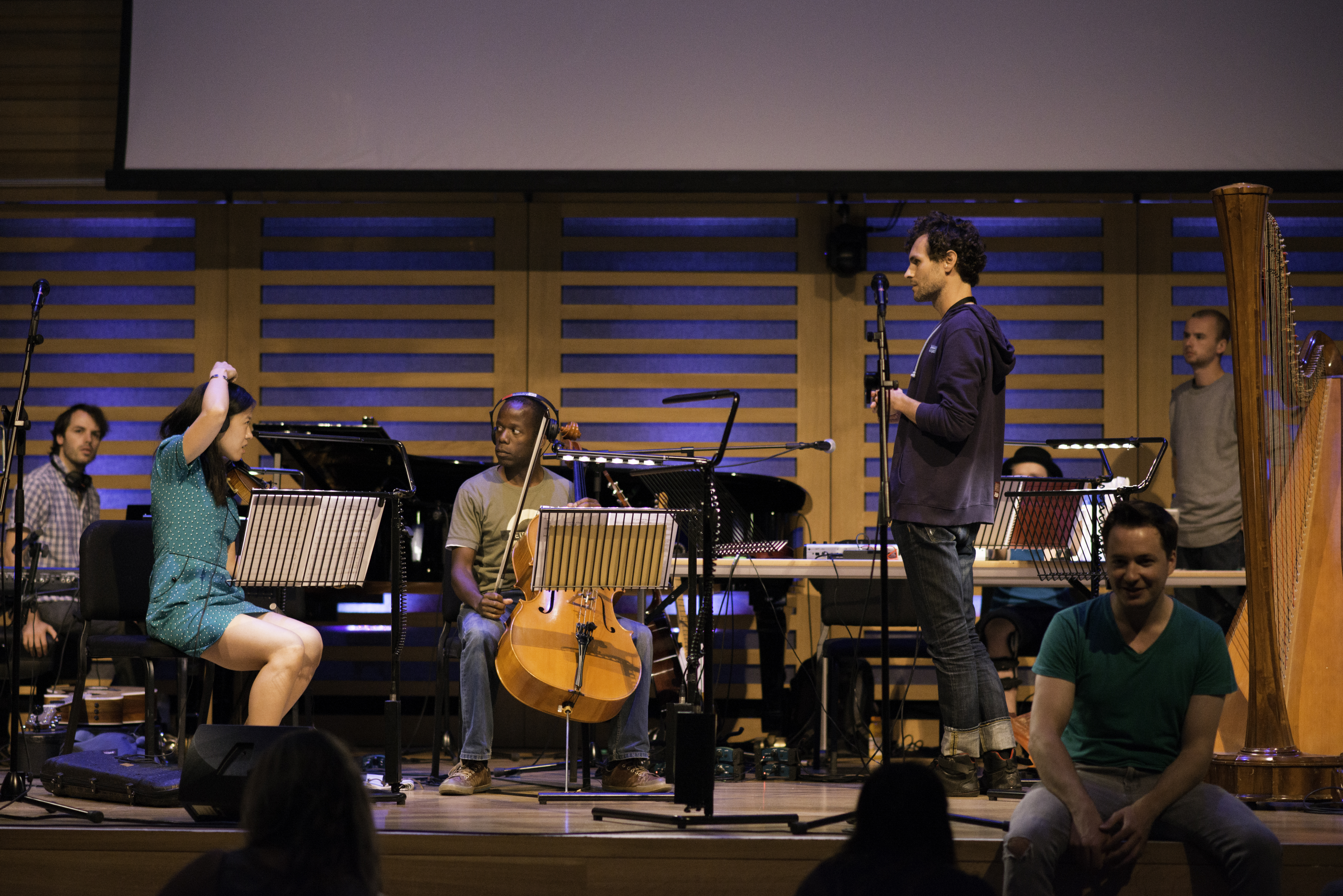
Toni Castells and his ensemble rehearsing for the performance of "Life from Light" at Kings Place in London in 2014.

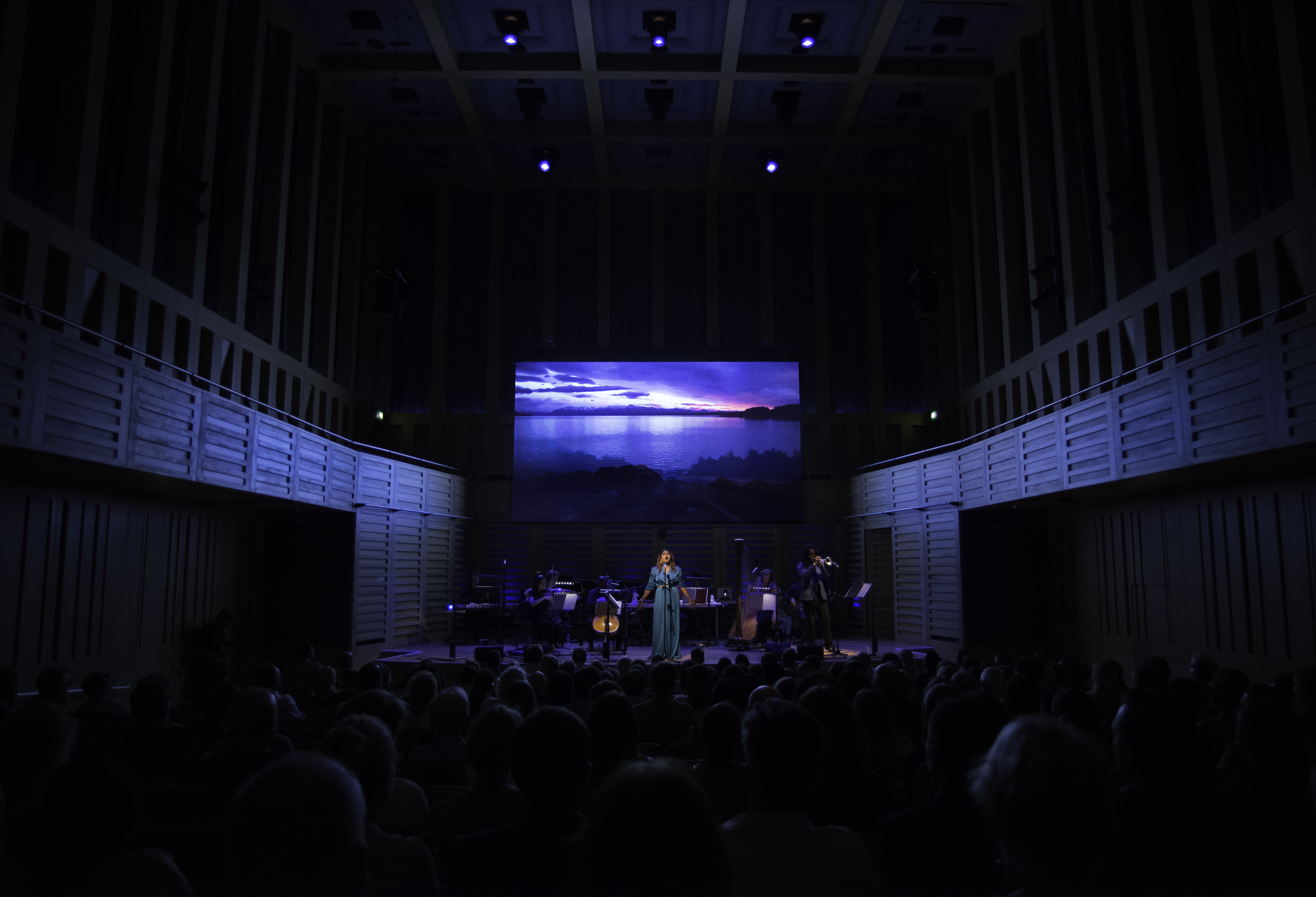
Soprano Meeta Raval and ensemble performing "Life from Light" at Kings Place in London in 2014.

Life from Light was re-adapted in 2014 for performances at London’s Kings Place Hall One on 7 and 8 August, presented by invitation of Tete-a-Tete Opera and supported by Arts Council England.

=== 2045: The Year Man Becomes Immortal? (2016) ===
2045: The Year Man Becomes Immortal? is a multimedia chamber oratorio for small ensemble, electronics, two solo voices and choir. It premiered at St James’s Piccadilly in London on 6 July 2016, with a private performance held at Cowdray Park on 9 July. The work departs from traditional operatic form, combining operatic voices with elements of popular music, downtempo electronica and sound art. Written for soprano, countertenor, piano trio and mixed choir, the composition also features sonifications of light curves recorded by NASA’s Keplerspace observatory.

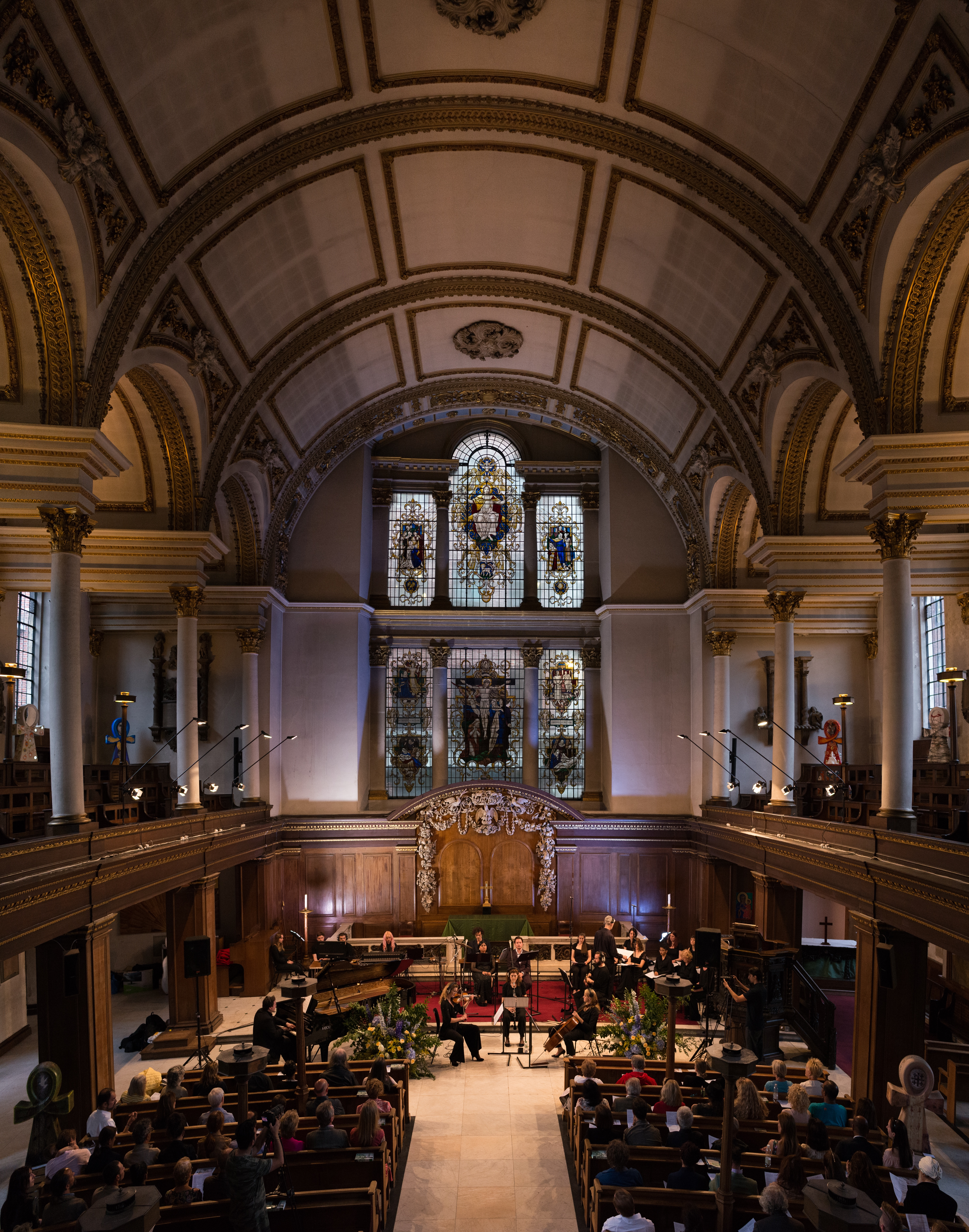
Toni Castells and his ensemble performing "2045: The Year Man Becomes Immortal" at St. James's Piccadilly in London in 2016.

The title refers to an article published on Time Magazine in 2011 by Lev Grossman, in which computer engineer and futurist Ray Kurzweil, Director of Engineering at Google, predicted the arrival of the Technological Singularity, a future moment when humans and machines would merge, potentially eliminating death. Castells’s work contrasts this transhumanist vision with the philosophy of Alan Watts, who taught that death is an essential part of life’s natural cycle and that fearing it is a cultural illusion. Through this juxtaposition, 2045 examines contemporary society’s struggle with mortality and its obsession with technological transcendence.

=== Hhumann X (2018) ===
Hhumann X is a composition for small chamber ensemble, electronics, two voices and choir that premiered at LSO St. Luke's in London on 20 October 2018. The work was inspired by the findings of the Jo Cox Commission on Loneliness, whose 2014 report revealed that over nine million adults in the United Kingdom often or always feel lonely.

The work explores social isolation in an age of technological hyper-connectedness and seeks to raise awareness of the psychological and social consequences of loneliness. Its premiere featured More Than Just a Choir, a North London community ensemble supporting people experiencing mental illness and social exclusion, with support from the Central and North West London NHS Foundation Trust. Castells described the work as an attempt to reflect on “the double-edged effects of modernisation upon Western society.”

For the premiere, Castells collaborated with Spanish pianist José Menor, violinist Harriet MacKenzie, and soprano Honey Rouhani. Menor was nominated the same year for a Latin Grammy Award in the Best Classical Album category for Enrique Granados: Goyescas (IBS Classical, 2018).

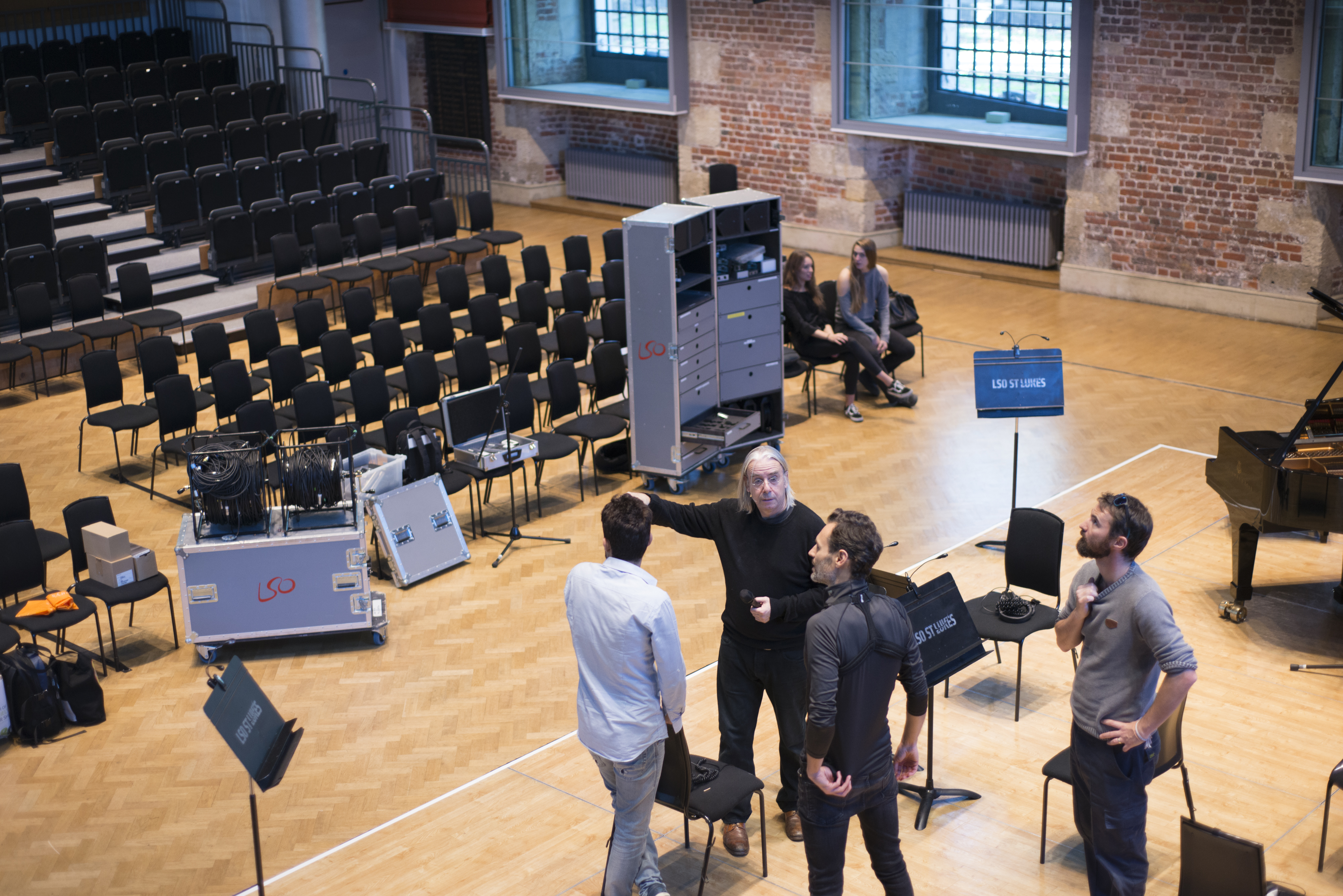
Toni Castells and his team preparing the premiere of "Hhumann X" at LSO St Luke's in London in 2018.

== Artistic Collaborations ==
=== Oceanic Global - World Oceans Day at the United Nations in New York (2023) ===
In 2023 Castells was commissioned by Leah d’Auriol, founder of Oceanic Global to write the music for the 2023 World Oceans Day event entitled 'Planet Ocean: Tides are Changing'. The hybrid event was hosted by the Division for Ocean Affairs and the Law of the Sea, Office of Legal Affairs (DOALOS), in partnership with Oceanic Global and supported by Panerai, with contribution by Discover Earth at the United Nations Headquarters in New York City and was broadcast live on UNWorldOceansDay.org and supporting channels for global accessibility.

=== Burgs - Endless Blue Skies (2023) ===
Castells collaborated with meditation teacher Burgs, founder of the organisation The Art of Meditation, on his album Endless Blue Skies. Castells provided music to the tracks 'Time to Remember' and 'Mother and Daughter Clear Light'. Burgs was trained extensively in the Jhana practices by Pa Auk Sayadaw in Burma and in Dzogchen by His Holiness Dodrupchen Rinpoche in Sikkim India.

=== Cyril de Commarque - Artificialis at the Saatchi Gallery (2019) ===
In 2019, Castells collaborated with artist Cyril de Commarque on the soundscape for his multi-media installation Artificialis, presented as part of the Saatchi Gallery's Artist-In-Residence programme. The piece was exhibited alongside a companion installation by Kate Daudy, both created in response to Tutankhamun: Treasures of the Golden Pharaoh, inviting viewers to reflect on ideas of legacy, mortality, and human transition.

The exhibition, organised by IMG Exhibitions, showcased over 150 original artifacts from Tutankhamun’s tomb, many displayed outside Egypt for the first and last time, and ran in London from 2019 until March 2020, when it closed early due to the COVID-19 pandemic.

=== Liam Hodges - Catwalk OST for Mutations in the 4th Dimension (2019) ===
In 2018 Castells collaborated with British fashion designer Liam Hodges to create the soundtrack of Hodge's presentation at London Fashion Week of his 2019 Fall/Winter collection entitled ‘Mutations in the 4th Dimension’ in January 2019. The soundtrack featured reworked arrangements of Castells's Hhumann X which were performed live by soprano Honey Rouhani.

=== Catty Pearson - Songwriting for Time Tells Me (2017-2018) ===
Through 2017 and 2018 Castells started a writing collaboration with British singer-songwriter Catty Pearson, co-writing some of the songs of her 2018 independently released debut EP ‘Time Tells Me’. The EP was produced by Chris Kimsey, best known for his work producing The Rolling Stones, and recorded at legendary Olympic Sound Studios.

=== Hayley Westenra - American TV Appearance with Naturaleza Muerta (2013) ===
In 2013, Decca Records commissioned Castells to coach crossover artist Hayley Westenra for a forthcoming TV appearance on American TV with Greek tenor Mario Frangoulis to perform a crossover version of Naturaleza Muerta, hit track by Spanish composer José María Cano and first released by Spanish pop band Mecano in 1991.

=== Noah Stewart - Sting's Field of Gold Spanish Adaptation (2012) ===
In 2011, leading classical label Decca Records commissioned Castells to translate Sting’s hit song Fields of Gold into Spanish. The translation was entitled Campos de Oro and was included in American tenor’s Noah Stewart self-titled debut crossover album Noah, which was released in 2012 under Decca Records. Castells also became Noah’s vocal coach for this particular track, which was recorded at Metropolis Studios in London. Noah became the first black musician ever to top the UK Classical Album Chart when his album Noah reached number one and remained there for 7 weeks.

=== Plácido Domingo and José María Cano - Real Madrid CF Centenary Anthem (2000-2003) ===
In 2002 Castells worked with José María Cano recording and mixing the new Centenary Anthem for Real Madrid CF called Hala Madrid!, featuring Plácido Domingo and composed by José María Cano himself to celebrate the Spanish football club's centenary in 2002.

== Music, Art and Philanthropy ==
Castells has been involved a variety of events that combine music, art and philanthropy. He created Buy Music, Get Art in 2008. For the project, held at Maddox Arts in Mayfair, a work of contemporary art by Norwegian artist based in Los Angeles Edvarda Braanaas entitled Ceci n'est pas Une Fille was sold in shares through a limited edition CD. Another Castells project was Love in the Sky. Launched on June 30, 2009 at the Institute of Contemporary Arts in London, the exhibition featured collaborative works from a collection of artists, which were auctioned off that night to benefit Coram, a charity for underprivileged children. More than £8,000 was raised. He is also the founder of Xmas Rocks for Charity, a fundraising concert that took place in December 2007 at the Notting Hill Community Church to raise money for Depression Alliance and the Mood Foundation.

== Discography ==
Artist	Title	Format	Label	Year
Herzia	Coses que Passen	CD	AZ Records	1999
momo	Unharmed	CD	Instant Attraction Records	2007
momo	momo Live @ Bush Hall (Buy Music Get Art)	Limited Edition CD	Instant Attraction Records	2008
Toni Castells	Fake Boobs	Online Single	Instant Attraction Records	2009
Famous Jack	Famous Jack	Online Album	Interstellar Music	2009
Famous Jack	Superstar	Online Album	Interstellar Music	2010
Toni Castells	Sexual Intercourse	Online Double Single	Instant Attraction Records	2010
Toni Castells	Piano Works	Online Album	Instant Attraction Records	2011
Toni Castells	1.60.3600	Online Album	Instant Attraction Records	2011
Toni Castells	Ob	Online Album	Instant Attraction Records	2011
Toni Castells	Motherland	Online Album	Instant Attraction Records	2011
Toni Castells	Creation	CD	Instant Attraction Records	2011
Toni Castells	Life from Light (Live from Union Chapel)	CD/DVD	Interstellar Music	2013
Toni Castells	Slaves of Time	CD	Interstellar Music	2015
Toni Castells	Live from Kings Place	Online Album	Interstellar Music	2016
Toni Castells	4 Meditations	Online EP	Interstellar Music	2016
Toni Castells	2045: The Year Man Becomes Immortal (ft. Aquinas Piano Trio)	Online Album	Interstellar Music	2016
Toni Castells	2045	Online Album	Interstellar Music	2016
Toni Castells	Savior Programs	Online Album	Interstellar Music	2017
Toni Castells	Hhumann X	Online Album	Interstellar Music	2018
Toni Castells, Elliott Liu	Mutations in the 4th Dimension (Reimagined)	Online EP	Interstellar Music	2019
Toni Castells	Hhumann X (Live at LSO St Luke's)	Online Album	Interstellar Music	2019
Toni Castells	Call Thou Upon My Name Unto Eternity, and It Shall Never Fail	Online Single	Interstellar Music	2019
Toni Castells	Slaves of Time (Reimagined)	Online Album	Interstellar Music	2020
Toni Castells, Sujay Bobade	Too Late Tomorrow	Online Single	Interstellar Music	2021
Toni Castells	Am I? I Am	Online Album	Interstellar Music	2021
Toni Castells	Sex in Japan	Online Album	Interstellar Music	2021
Toni Castells, Cyril de Commarque	Artificialis	Online Single	Interstellar Music	2021
Toni Castells	I Dream Of You In Colours That Don't Exist	Online Album	Interstellar Music	2022
Toni Castells	The Mission	Online Single	Interstellar Music	2022
Toni Castells	For Hans	Online Single	Interstellar Music	2023
Toni Castells	On The Nature Of Things	Online Single	Interstellar Music	2023
Toni Castells	Kállos	Online Single	Interstellar Music	2023
Toni Castells	Quan Et Veig En Flor	Online Single	Interstellar Music	2023
Toni Castells	World Oceans Day 2023	Online EP	Interstellar Music	2023
