= San Pietro, Bisenti =

Coordinates: 42°30′41″N 13°47′23″E

San Pietro ()
- Frazione
- Interactive map of San Pietro ()
- Country: Italy
- Region: Abruzzo
- Province: Teramo
- Time zone: UTC+1 (CET)
  - Summer (DST): UTC+2 (CEST)

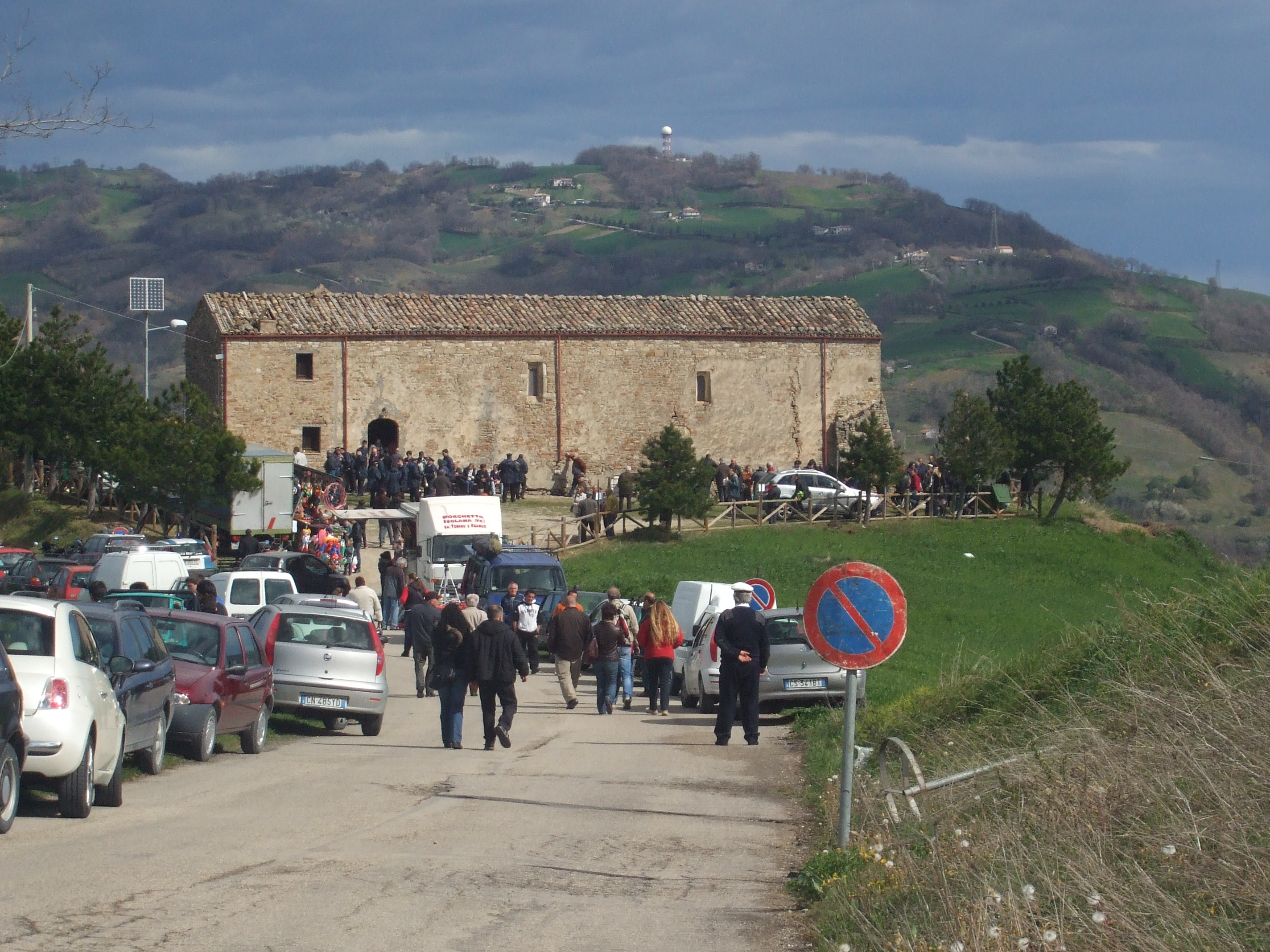

San Pietro is a frazione in the Province of Teramo in the Abruzzo region of Italy.
