= Federico Castellón =

Spanish-American painter

- Born: Federico Cristencia de Castellón y Martínez; September 14, 1914; Almería, Spain
- Died: July 29, 1971 (aged 56)
- Known for: Painter; sculptor; book illustrator; printmaker

Federico Castellón (September 14, 1914 – July 29, 1971) was a Spanish-American painter, sculptor, printmaker, and illustrator. His prints and drawings from the early 1930s are among the first examples of Surrealism created by an American artist, produced before his travels abroad and before the seminal 1936 exhibition "Fantastic Art, Dada, Surrealism" at New York's Museum of Modern Art. He later taught at several prestigious institutions and received two Guggenheim fellowships.

== Early life and training ==
Castellón was born in Almería, Spain, and immigrated to the United States with his family in 1921, settling in Brooklyn, New York. A self-taught artist, he began sketching at a young age and visited the city's museums, where his influences ranged from Old Masters to modern artists including Giorgio de Chirico, Pablo Picasso, Salvador Dalí, and Georges Rouault.

At Erasmus High School, teachers recognized his draughtsmanship. After graduation, he completed a mural for the school on the subject of arts and sciences. Inspired by modern European movements, the mural attracted critical attention when exhibited at Raymond & Raymond Galleries before its permanent installation at the school.

== Career ==
=== Early recognition ===
Castellón was introduced to Diego Rivera, who had an international reputation and was painting murals for Rockefeller Center. Rivera took an interest in the young man's work and brought Castellón's drawings to the attention of the director of the Weyhe Gallery, who subsequently gave the eighteen-year-old his first solo exhibition.

=== European fellowship ===
In 1934, with Rivera's help, Castellón was awarded a four-year fellowship, sponsored by the Spanish Government, to travel throughout Europe to study painting and printmaking. During this period, he began exhibiting his work in museums in France and Spain.

In 1935, Castellón participated in the Paris Exhibition of Spanish Artists that included Pablo Picasso, Juan Gris, and Joan Miró.

=== Illustration and wartime work ===
In 1937, Castellón returned to New York and began experimenting with lithography, using this medium to create illustrations for Edgar Allan Poe's allegorical tale, "The Masque of the Red Death". His illustration work included Bulfinch's Mythology, The Story of Marco Polo, and The Little Prince.

In 1940, Castellón received the first of two Guggenheim fellowships. His work continued to attract attention as he was included in exhibitions at the Museum of Modern Art, Whitney Museum of American Art, and Art Institute of Chicago.

Castellón became an American citizen in 1943. During World War II, he served with the OSS and was assigned to the Burma theater. Throughout the 1940s and 1950s, his work was informed by his travels: to China with the U.S. Army; to Italy on his second Guggenheim fellowship; and to Paris and Madrid, where he moved his family briefly while undertaking commissions from American periodicals, including The Epic of Man series for LIFE magazine.

In 1949, he was commissioned by the Print Club of Albany for its annual print.

=== Teaching and later career ===
Although his formal education ended with high school, Castellón taught at Teachers College, Columbia University, Pratt Institute, and Queens College. He was elected to membership in the National Academy of Design, was awarded a First Prize from the Library of Congress, and was a member of the Society of American Graphic Artists.

== Legacy ==
Castellón died in 1971. A retrospective of his prints was held at the Allied Artists of America in 1978. In 1982, a retrospective exhibition of his work was held at Anderson & Anderson Master Prints (Loveland, Colorado). In 2004, his prints and paintings were exhibited at Emil Nelson Gallery (Denver, Colorado). In early 2010, Castellón's work was exhibited at the Kalamazoo Institute, along with the graphic work of Francisco Goya.

Although Castellón worked in virtually every medium, he remains best known for his early graphic work, particularly his lithographs and etchings, media in which he achieved mastery.
