= Nationalities of Spain =

Nationalities of Spain can refer to:

- Nationalities and regions of Spain, for constitutional designation of certain subnational political entities
- National and regional identity in Spain, for political movements and ideologies
- Spanish nationality law
- Spaniards or Spanish people, a national term for people from any part of Spain
