= First of May Group =

Anarchist anti-Franco resistance movement

- Leader: Octavio Alberola (alleged)
- Dates active: 1966-1974
- Country: Spain, UK, France
- Ideology: Anti-Francoist, Anti-Imperialism, Anarchism

The First of May Group was an anarchist anti-Franco resistance movement which took militant action against Francoist Spain. They were formed in 1966 by Spanish exiles including Iberian Federation of Libertarian Youth (FIJL) members in France, dissatisfied with what they perceived as the quietism of other opposition groups. Actions attributed to the group include the kidnapping of diplomat and priest Monsignor Marcos Ussia, occupation of the Vatican Embassy in 1966 and the machine-gunning of the Spanish embassy in London. A man claiming to speak for the group stated that they were behind the March 1974 bombing of the Spanish Cultural Institute in Dublin. In 1980 the book Towards a citizens militia: anarchist alternatives to NATO and the Warsaw pact was written by 'International Revolutionary Solidarity Movement (First of May Group) and published by Cienfuegos Press.

In Greece a group of a similar name but without any relation also appeared in 1989, mostly known for killing Supreme Court Prosecutor Anastasios Vernardos.

== Actions ==
=== Kidnapping of Marcos Ussia ===
The First of May Group staged its first attack on 1 May 1966 with the kidnapping the ecclesiastic adviser for the Spanish Embassy to the Vatican, Monsignor Marcos Ussia. Ussia was taken captive as he was driving to his home in the Rome suburbs by "three young anarchists" wearing masks who blocked a narrow road with a car and one of their bodies before taking him in their car to a house in which he was kept for the duration of his confinement. Ussia remained missing for eleven days before being released unharmed on 11 May 1966, He was found after release approaching a Vatican Gendarme Post in western Rome. Ussia at a subsequent press conference explained his kidnappers motives, saying they had kidnapped him in order to persuade Pope Paul to intervene in favour the release of all political prisoners in Spain. Luis Andrés Edo was later formally accused of being complicit in the kidnapping after being arrested for Operation Durruti.

=== Operation Durruti ===
On 24 October 1966 five members of First of May Group including Luis Andrés Edo were arrested in Madrid by the Brigada Político-Social, the Francoist secret police, and charged with preparing acts of terrorism after being infiltrated by a police informant. The group had planned to kidnap US Rear Admiral Norman Campbell Gillette, Jr., the Commander of US forces in Spain. The action was referred to as 'Operation Durruti' named after the famous Spanish Anarchist Buenaventura Durruti. Octavio Alberola later flew to New York personally to announce the failure of Operation Durruti in a press conference in which he confirmed the plan to kidnap Rear Admiral Gillette.

== See also ==
- Anarchism in Spain
- The Angry Brigade
- Terrorism in Spain
- Spanish Maquis
- Stuart Christie

== Bibliography ==
- Meltzer, Albert (1973). The International Revolutionary Solidarity Movement: 1st Of May Group. Cienfuegos. ISBN 978-0-904564-08-2.
- Téllez, Antonio (2010). Anarchist International Action Against Francoism From Genoa 1949 to The First Of May Group. Kate Sharpley Library. ISBN 978-1-873605-85-1.
