= Suceso Portales =

Spanish anarcho-feminist

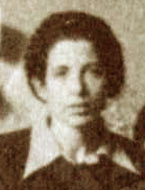
Suceso Portales (1938)

Maria Suceso Portales Casamar (Zahínos, Badajoz, March 4, 1904 – Sevilla, January 23, 1999) was an Extremaduran anarcho-feminist.

== Biography ==
She was born into an anarchist family; her siblings Juan and Luis would also be active within the anarchist movement. She was noted for her participation in Mujeres Libres, a libertarian women's organization, which she joined in 1936, and its periodical. Characterized as a "reactionary", she served as the organization's national vice-secretary. She was also active in Libertarian Youth and Confederación Nacional del Trabajo. Portales was one of the interviewees in Vivir la utopía. She became an exile in the UK in 1939. In November 1964, she began editing the journal Mujeres Libres from London.
