= Castel San Pietro Romano =

- Comune
- Comune di Castel San Pietro Romano
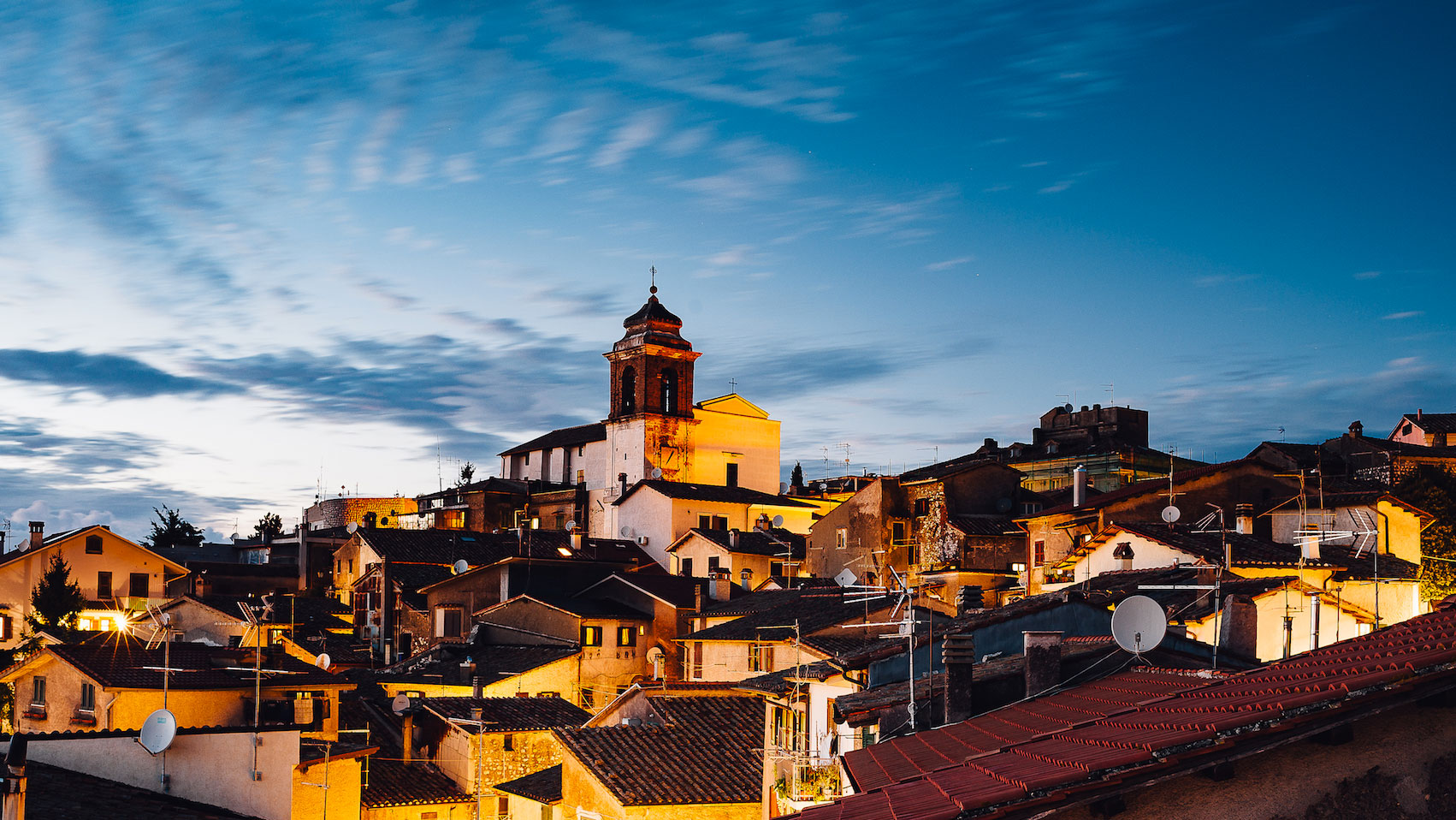
- View of Castel San Pietro Romano

- Location within Italy Location within Lazio
- Coordinates: 41°51′N 12°54′E
- Country: Italy
- Region: Lazio
- Metropolitan city: Rome

Government
  - Mayor: Gianpaolo Nardi

Area
  - Total: 15.1 km^{2} (5.8 sq mi)
- Elevation: 752 m (2,467 ft)

Population (30 September 2017)
  - Total: 883
  - Density: 58.5/km^{2} (151/sq mi)
- Demonym: Castellani
- Time zone: UTC+1 (CET)
  - Summer (DST): UTC+2 (CEST)
- Postal code: 00030
- Dialing code: 06
- Website: Official website

Castel San Pietro Romano is a comune (municipality) in the Metropolitan City of Rome in the Italian region of Latium, located about 35 kilometres (22 mi) east of Rome. In 2017, it had a population of 883.

It is one of I Borghi più belli d'Italia ("The most beautiful villages of Italy") and received the "Comune Riciclone del Lazio" award from Legambiente. It is a member of Cittaslow.

On 12 October 2018, the country had its first honorary citizen, Gina Lollobrigida.
