= Libertarian Youth =

Spanish political organization

Libertarian Youth Federación Ibérica de Juventudes Libertarias - Juventudes Libertarias
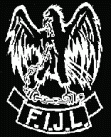
- Founded: 1932
- Ideology: Anarchism; Anti-authoritarianism; Libertarian socialism Anarcha-feminism; Anti-militarism; Anarcho-syndicalism
- Website: juventudeslibertarias.com

The Iberian Federation of Libertarian Youth (Spanish: Federación Ibérica de Juventudes Libertarias (FIJL)), sometimes abbreviated as Libertarian Youth (Juventudes Libertarias), is an anarcho-syndicalist organisation created in 1932 in Madrid.

== History ==
The FIJL was created in 1932 in Madrid. In February 1937 the FIJL organised a plenum of regional organisations (second congress of FIJL). In October 1938, from the 16th through the 30th in Barcelona, the FIJL participated in a national plenum of the libertarian movement, which was also attended by members of the Confederación Nacional del Trabajo (CNT) and the Iberian Anarchist Federation (FAI).

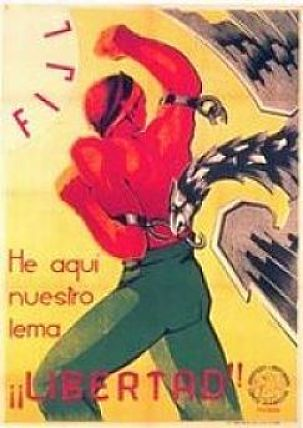
Poster of the FIJL from the 1930s

During the May Days purge of the Workers' Party of Marxist Unification (POUM) and other anti-Stalin organisations, which took place in Barcelona towards the end of the Spanish Civil War, many FIJL members were murdered by those acting under Joseph Stalin's orders. After the Civil War, FIJL acted in two branches: one in exile in Paris, and one secret and illegal domestic organisation under the Franco government. Some FIJL members were associated with the militant First of May Group. FIJL was banned in France in 1963.

The organisation's most famous member was Federico Borrell García, the subject of Robert Capa's most well known photograph, The Falling Soldier. The image, taken in 1936, depicts the moment of García's death during the Spanish Civil War.

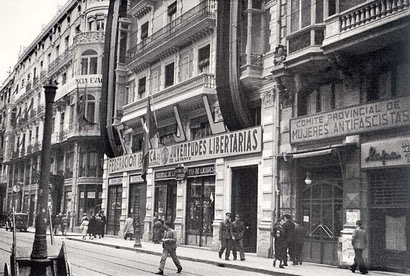
Offices of the Federación Ibérica de Juventudes Libertarias (FIJL). De la Paz street in Valencia in the 1930s

=== 21st century ===
During the early 2000s, the FIJL started to evolve towards insurrectionist positions and its differences with anarcho-syndicalism became more evident; this was due to the influence of the black block in alterglobalization protests and the influence of developments from Italy and Greece. Following this it suffered a period of significant state repression, resulting in inactivity.

In 2006, a new generation of anarchist youth decided to establish a new FIJL. The new organisation differentiated itself from the insurrectionist FIJL, defending anarcho-syndicalism critically. In 2007, after a period of no communication from the original FIJL, the new group re-established itself as the FIJL, but upon learning of a communique by the insurrectionist organization named itself Iberian Federation of Anarchist Youth (Spanish: Federación Ibérica de Juventudes Anarquistas (FIJA)), but claimed to represent the ideological heritage of the FIJL. They publish a newspaper called El Fuelle.

In March 2012 the insurrectionist FIJL disbanded, prompting FIJA to once again claim the name. Today, this FIJL has a presence in Asturias, Cádiz, San Sebastián, Granada, Lorca (Murcia), and Madrid.

== Sources ==
- Esenwein, George Richard. The Spanish Civil War: A Modern Tragedy, Routledge, 2005.
- Gómez Casas, Juan (1986). Anarchist Organisation: The History of the F.A.I., Black Rose Books Ltd., ISBN 0-920057-38-1.
