= Gender of God =

The gender of God can be viewed as a literal or as an allegorical aspect of God, or the supreme deity. While most deities are often thought of having a gender which would enable them to sexually interact with each other, and even with humans; the supreme deity is often seen as genderless due to its characteristic of being transcendent, especially in monotheist religions, although this concept might differ depending on the religious belief.

== Abrahamic religions ==
In the Hebrew and Christian Bible, God is usually described in male terms in biblical sources, with female analogy in Genesis 1:26–27, (Note: Genesis 1:26–27) Psalm 123:2-3, (Note: Psalm 123:2–3) and Luke 15:8–10; (Note: Luke 15:8–10) a mother in Deuteronomy 32:18, (Note: Deuteronomy 32:18) Isaiah 66:13, (Note: Isaiah 66:13) Isaiah 49:15, (Note: Isaiah 49:15) Isaiah 42:14, (Note: Isaiah 42:14) Psalm 131:2; (Note: Psalm 131:2) and a mother hen in Matthew 23:37 (Note: Matthew 23:37) and Luke 13:34, (Note: Luke 13:34) although never directly referred to as being female.

Marc Zvi Brettler notes that contributions to critical Biblical scholarship suggest that YHWH was viewed as a male God, being gendered with human tendencies, and while the Bible holds distinct voices as a composite text, it should also be understood as an ancient Near-Eastern document in its original context.

=== Baháʼí Faith ===
In the Baháʼí Faith, Baha'u'llah uses the Mother as an attribute of God: "He Who is well-grounded in all knowledge, He Who is the Mother, the Soul, the Secret, and the Essence". Baha'u'llah further writes that "Every single letter proceeding out of the mouth of God is indeed a Mother Letter, and every word uttered by Him Who is the Well Spring of Divine Revelation is a Mother Word, and His Tablet a Mother Tablet." The Primal Will of God is personified as the maid of heaven in the Baháʼí writings.

=== Christianity ===
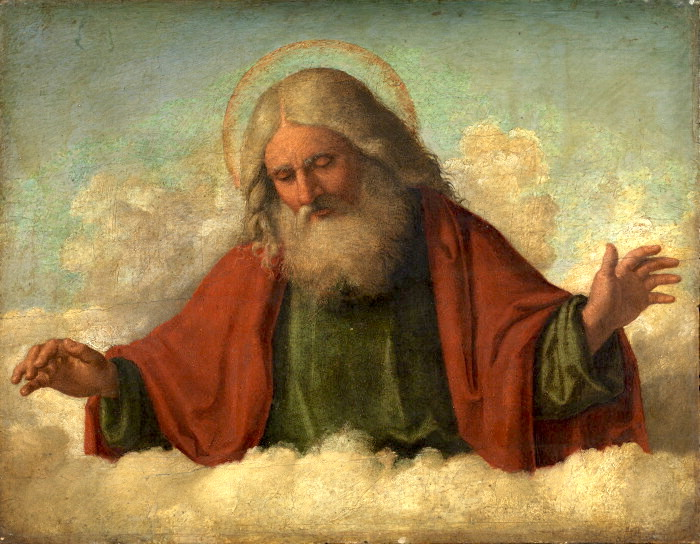
God the Father, Cima da Conegliano, c. 1510–1517

Most Christian groups conceive of God as Triune, believing that God the Father, God the Son, and God the Holy Spirit are distinct persons, but one being that is wholly God.

God the Son, having been incarnated as a human man (Jesus Christ), is masculine. Classical western philosophy believes that God lacks a literal sex as it would be impossible for God to have a body (a prerequisite for sex). However, Classical western philosophy states that God should be referred to (in most contexts) as masculine by analogy; the reason being God's relationship with the world as begetter of the world and revelation (i.e. analogous to an active instead of receptive role in sexual intercourse). Others interpret God as neither male nor female.

The New Testament refers to the Holy Spirit, a part of God, as masculine in a number of places; where the masculine Greek word "Paraclete" occurs, for "Comforter", most clearly in the Gospel of John, chapters 14 to 16. These texts were particularly significant when Christians were debating whether the New Testament teaches that the Holy Spirit is a fully divine person, or some kind of "force". All major English Bible translations have retained the masculine pronoun for the Spirit, as in John 16:13, although it has been noted that in the original Greek, in some parts of John's Gospel, the neuter Greek word πνεύμα pneuma is also used for the Spirit.

The Catechism of the Catholic Church, Book 239, states that God is called "Father", while his love for man may also be depicted as motherhood. However, God ultimately transcends the human concept of sex, and "is neither man nor woman: He is God."

In 2021, James Talarico, who has a masters in theology, stated on the Texas House floor “The first two lines in Genesis use two different Hebrew words to describe God. One of them is the masculine Hebrew noun for divinity. The second is the feminine Hebrew noun for spirit. God is both masculine and feminine and everything in between. God is non-binary.” The claim became an immediate cultural flashpoint with supporters pointing out that being uncategorizable is inherently non-binary and detractors either disagreeing or agreeing with the idea but being offended by the terminology. The fact he said this was used as a major theme in the rhetoric and attack ads of those opposing his successful electoral run for Texas Senate.

==== Church of Jesus Christ of Latter Day Saints ====
In contrast to most Christian denominations, The Church of Jesus Christ of Latter-day Saints (LDS Church) teaches that God the Father, God the Son, and the Holy Spirit are physically distinct while being one in purpose. LDS Church members also believe that God the Father is married to a divine woman, referred to as "Heavenly Mother". Humans are considered to be spirit children of these heavenly parents.

The Church of Jesus Christ of Latter Day Saints (LDS) doctrine teaches that God, Jesus, and the Holy Spirit are three distinct and separate beings. In LDS teachings, God has a physical body, and thus is not only identified as being a man, but is physically male. The same is for Jesus, but not for the Holy Spirit, which has a spiritual form. God is also married to Heavenly Mother, who also has a physical body.

=== Islam ===
Islam teaches that God (Allah) is beyond any comparison, transcendent, and thus God is beyond any gender attributes. Arabic only possesses gendered pronouns ("he" and "she") but does not have gender neutral pronouns ("it"), and "he" is typically used in cases where the subject's gender is indeterminate. Because Allah has no gender traits and gender is a trait of creation that is needed for reproduction, it is impossible for God to have a gender and an offspring. Thus, Allah is typically referred to as "He".

In various passages of the Quran, God also refers to Himself as "We", regarding authority in sustaining creation, similar to "royal we", and "I", in directly responding to worship commands or prayers to angels and mankind.

=== Judaism ===
Although the gender of God in Judaism is referred to in the Tanakh with masculine imagery and grammatical forms, traditional Jewish philosophy does not attribute the concept of sex to God. (Note: "The fact that we always refer to God as 'He' is also not meant to imply that the concept of sex or gender applies to God." Kaplan, Aryeh (Rabbi). 1983. The Aryeh Kaplan Reader. Mesorah Publications. p. 144.) At times, Jewish aggadic literature and Jewish mysticism do treat God as gendered. The ways in which God is gendered have also changed across time, with some modern Jewish thinkers viewing God as outside of the gender binary. Guillaume Postel (16th century), Michelangelo Lanci (19th century), and Mark Sameth (21st century) theorize that the four letters of the personal name of God, YHWH, are a cryptogram which the priests of ancient Israel would have read in reverse as huhi, "heshe", signifying a dual-gendered deity.

=== Unificationism ===
Unificationism views God, the Creator, as having dual characteristics of masculinity and femininity. Since an artist, like God, can only express that which is within the boundaries of their own nature, and according to Genesis 1:27, "So God created mankind in his own image, male and female he created them", indicating that God's image includes both male and female attributes.

Due to the more active role of masculinity, mankind typically portrays God as male, but the more receptive or supportive and nurturing role within God's characteristics is less emphasized or even neglected or ignored in writings and in art.

== Animism ==
Animist religions are common among oral societies, many of which still exist in the 21st century. Typically, natural forces and shaman spiritual guides feature in these religions, rather than fully-fledged personal divinities with established personalities. It is in polytheism that such deities are found. Animist religions often, but not always, attribute gender to spirits considered to permeate the world and its events. Polytheistic religions, however, almost always attribute gender to their gods, though a few notable divinities are associated with various forms of epicene characteristics—gods that manifest alternatingly as male and female, gods with one male and one female "face", and gods whose most distinctive characteristic is their unknown gender.

== Feminist spirituality ==
In her essay "Why Women Need the Goddess", Carol P. Christ argues the notion of there having been an ancient religion of a supreme goddess. The essay was first presented in the spring of 1978 as a keynote address for the "Great Goddess Re-emerging" conference at the University of California, Santa Cruz. Christ also co-edited the classic feminist religion anthologies Weaving the Visions: New Patterns in Feminist Spirituality (1989) and Womanspirit Rising (1979/1989), the latter of which include her 1978 essay.

== Indian religions ==
=== Hinduism ===
In Hinduism, there are diverse approaches to conceptualizing God and gender. Many Hindus focus upon impersonal Absolute (Brahman) which is genderless. Other Hindu traditions conceive God as androgynous (both female and male), alternatively as either male or female, while cherishing gender henotheism, that is without denying the existence of other Gods in either gender.

The Shakti tradition conceives of God as a female. Other Bhakti traditions of Hinduism have both male and female gods. In ancient and medieval Indian mythology, each masculine deva of the Hindu pantheon is partnered with a feminine who is often a devi.

The oldest of the Hindu scriptures is the Rigveda (2nd millennium BC). The first word of the Rigveda is the name Agni, the god of fire, to whom many of the vedic hymns are addressed, along with Indra the warrior. Agni and Indra are both male divinities.

The Rigveda refers to a creator (Hiranyagarbha or Prajapati), distinct from Agni and Indra. This creator is identified with Brahma (not to be confused with Brahman, the first cause), born of Vishnu's navel, in later scriptures. Hiranyagarbha and Prajapati are male divinities, as is Brahma (who has a female consort, Saraswati).

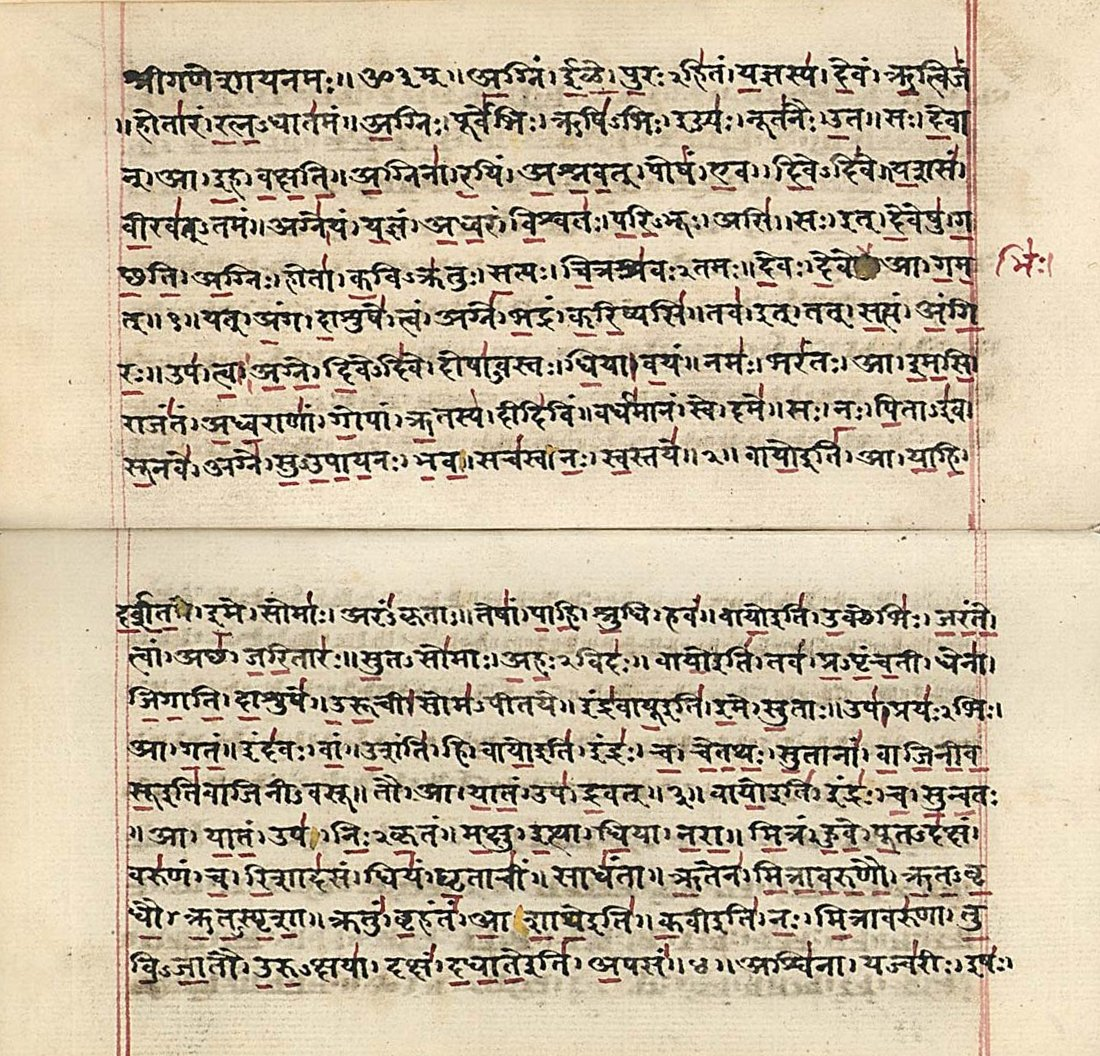
Rigveda

There are many other gods in the Rigveda. They are "not simple forces of nature," and possess "complex character and their own mythology." They include goddesses of water (Āpaḥ) and dawn (Uṣas), and the complementary pairing of Father Heaven and Mother Earth. However, they are all "subservient to the abstract, but active positive 'force of truth' [Ṛta]...which pervades the universe and all actions of the gods and humans." This force is sometimes mediated or represented by moral gods (the Āditya, e.g. Varuṇa) or even Indra. The Āditya are male and Ṛta is personified as masculine in later scriptures (see also Dharma).

In some Hindu philosophical traditions, God is depersonalized as the quality-less Nirguna Brahman, the fundamental life force of the universe. However, theism itself is central to Hinduism.

While many Hindus focus upon God in the neutral form, Brahman being of neuter gender grammatically, there are prominent Hindu traditions that conceive God as female, even as the source of the male form of God, such as the Shakta denomination. Hinduism, especially of the Samkhya school, views the creation of the cosmos as the result of the play of two radically distinct principles: the feminine matter (Prakṛti) and the masculine spirit (Purusha). Prakṛti is the primordial matter which is present before the cosmos becomes manifest. Prakṛti is seen as being "the power of nature, both animate and inanimate. As such, nature is seen as dynamic energy" (Rae, 1994). Prakriti is originally passive, immobile and pure potentiality by nature. Only through her contact with the kinetic Purusha she unfolds into the diverse forms before us. The idea of Prakṛti/Purusha leads to the concept of the Divine Consort. Almost every deva of the Hindu pantheon has a feminine consort (devi).

=== Sikhism ===
The scripture of Sikhism is the Guru Granth Sahib. Printed as a heading for the Guru Granth, and for each of its major divisions, is the Mul Mantra, a short summary description of God, in Punjabi. Sikh tradition has it that this was originally composed by Guru Nanak (1469–1539), the founder of Sikhism.

Punjabi: ੴ ਸਤਿ ਨਾਮੁ ਕਰਤਾ ਪੁਰਖੁ ਨਿਰਭਉ ਨਿਰਵੈਰੁ ਅਕਾਲ ਮੂਰਤਿ ਅਜੂਨੀ ਸੈਭੰ ਗੁਰ ਪ੍ਰਸਾਦਿ ॥
ISO 15919: Ika ōaṅkāra sati nāmu karatā purakhu nirabha'u niravairu akāla mūrati ajūnī saibhaṃ gura prasādi.
English: One Universal God, The Name Is Truth, The Creator, Fearless, Without Hatred, Image Of The Timeless One, Beyond Birth, Self-Existent, By Guru's Grace.
According to Sikhi, God has "No" Gender. Mool Mantar describes God as being "Ajuni" (lit. not in any incarnations) which implies that God is not bound to any physical forms. This concludes: the All-pervading Lord is Gender-less.

ਸੁੰਨ ਮੰਡਲ ਇਕੁ ਜੋਗੀ ਬੈਸੇ ॥ ਨਾਰਿ ਨ ਪੁਰਖੁ ਕਹਹੁ ਕੋਊ ਕੈਸੇ ॥ ਤ੍ਰਿਭਵਣ ਜੋਤਿ ਰਹੇ ਲਿਵ ਲਾਈ ॥ ਸੁਰਿ ਨਰ ਨਾਥ ਸਚੇ ਸਰਣਾਈ ॥

Sunn mandal ik Yogi baiseh. Naar nuh purakhu kahahu kou kaiseh. Tribhavan joth raheh liv laaee. Suri nar naath sacheh saranaaee

The Yogi, the Primal Lord, sits in the Realm of Absolute Stillness (state free of mind's wanderings or Phurne). (Since God) is neither male nor female; how can anyone describe Him? The three worlds center their attention on His Light. The godly beings and the Yogic masters seek the Sanctuary of this True Lord.

— SGGS. Ang 685

However, the Guru Granth Sahib consistently refers to God as "He" and "Father" (with some exceptions), typically because the Guru Granth Sahib was written in north Indian Indo-Aryan languages (mixture of Punjabi and Sant Bhasha, Sanskrit with influences of Persian) which have no neutral gender. English translations of the teachings may eliminate any gender specifications. From further insights into the Sikh philosophy, it can be deduced that God is, sometimes, referred to as the Husband to the Soul-brides, in order to make a patriarchal society understand what the relationship with God is like. Also, God is considered to be the Father, Mother, and Companion.

== African traditional religions ==
In the indigenous Yoruba religion, God (Ọlọrun) is viewed as an entirely spiritual entity, who has no physical forms, images and no gender.

== See also ==
- Gender and religion
- Androgynos (Judaism) – Someone who possesses both male and female sexual characteristics
- Ardhanarishvara – Composite form of the Hindu deities Shiva and Parvati
- Radha Krishna – Divine couple in Hinduism
- Sky father – Figure type in various religions
- The Hebrew Goddess – 1967 book by Raphael Patai
- Thealogy – Study and reflection upon the feminine divine from a feminist perspective
- Queer theology – Theological method related to queer theory
