= Rebecca Alpert =

American academic and rabbi

- Born: April 12, 1950 (age 76); Brooklyn, New York, U.S.

Academic background
- Education: Erasmus Hall High School
- Alma mater: Barnard College (B.A.); Temple University (Ph.D.); Reconstructionist Rabbinical College (R.C.C.)

Academic work
- Institutions: Temple University
- Website: https://sites.temple.edu/rebeccatalpert

Rabbi Rebecca Trachtenberg Alpert (born April 12, 1950) is Professor of Religion Emerita at Temple University, and was one of the first women rabbis. Her chief academic interests are religions and sports and sexuality in Judaism.

== Early life and education ==
Rebecca Alpert was born in Brooklyn, New York, to Sylvia and Irving Trachtenberg. She attended Erasmus Hall High School and Barnard College before getting her Ph.D. in religion at Temple University and her rabbinical training at the Reconstructionist Rabbinical College (RRC) in Wyncote, Pennsylvania, outside Philadelphia, Pennsylvania. Her specialization is in American and especially Jewish American religious history, and she focuses on issues related to gender, sexuality and race. Her thinking about many of these issues was shaped by her teachers, who included Elaine Pagels and Mordecai Kaplan, the founder of Reconstructionist Judaism.

== Career ==
Alpert was ordained in 1976 making her one of the first 6 women ordained rabbis. After completing her Ph.D. in 1978, Alpert worked on a contractual basis with a number of synagogues in the U.S. and Canada. During this time she also taught courses in Holocaust Studies at Rutgers University, and she was the dean of students at the RRC until 1987. Thereafter she served in several capacities at Temple University: as Director of Adult Programs, Director of the Program in Women's Studies, a faculty member in the departments of religion and women's studies, Senior Associate Dean, College of Liberal Arts, and in June 2022 Professor Emerita.

Alpert's research has focused on explaining and expounding the Reconstructionist tradition, the place of gays and lesbians in Jewish religious history, and the relationships between Jews, blacks, and sports during the years 1930–1950. Her book on that topic, Out of Left Field: Jews and Black Baseball, was published by Oxford University Press. She has also edited several volumes and published articles on a wide range of topics including sexuality in Judaism, the definition of who is Jewish and who is not, gay liberation theology, and Jackie Robinson. Her book Like Bread on the Seder Plate: Jewish Lesbians and the Transformation of Tradition from Columbia University Press received the 1998 Lambda Literary Award for best LGBT book on religion. She also wrote "Finding Our Past: A Lesbian Interpretation of the Book of Ruth," which was included in Reading Ruth: Contemporary Women Reclaim a Sacred Story, edited by J. A. Kates and G.T. Reimer (1994). Geoffrey Claussen describes Alpert as contributing to musar literature.

She has lectured at a number of colleges and universities, including Columbia, UPenn, Princeton and Swarthmore and is an active public intellectual who writes for mainstream publications and frequently speaks at rallies and on panels in the Philadelphia region and beyond. Alpert is a recipient of a Christian R. and Mary F. Lindback Distinguished Teaching Award and Temple University's Great Teacher Award. She has taught courses on religion in American public life, Jews, America and sports, intellectual heritage, why books matter, and sexuality in world religions.

In 2022 Alpert retired from her position as a professor in the Departments of Religion and Gender, Sexuality, and Women's Studies at Temple University, and Senior Associate Dean of the College of Liberal Arts. She has mentored several graduate students, including Marie Dallam, author of Cowboy Christians, and Brett Krutzsch, author of Dying to Be Normal: Gay Martyrs and the Transformation of American Sexual Politics, both from Oxford University Press. According to her faculty website: "In the past several years her research has focused on religion and sports. Out of Left Field: Jews and Black Baseball, was published by Oxford University Press in June 2011. Religion and Sports: An Introduction and Case Studies was published by Columbia University Press in May 2015." An anthology co-edited with Arthur Remillard, Gods, Games, and Globalization: New Perspectives on Religion and Sport, was published by Mercer University Press in 2019.

== Israel ==
Alongside Katherine Franke, a Columbia Law School professor, Alpert publicly canceled her scheduled appearance at the Equality Forum's 2012 Global LGBT Summit in Philadelphia to protest Israel's policies toward the Palestinians, accusing the organizers of the forum of becoming "cheerleaders for Israel." She is an active member of the Rabbinical Council of Jewish Voice for Peace. Alpert believes that "to uphold Reconstructionist values I must stand, as a Jew, in solidarity with Palestinians" and supports the BDS movement, saying that in contemporary Jewish politics "that makes me an anti-Zionist...But in my mind, it makes me, finally, a Zionist who is working for the Zion that [Mordecai] Kaplan envisioned."

== Siddur Nashim ==
She commented (Reform Judaism, Winter 1991):

The experience of praying with Siddur Nashim [the first Jewish prayer book to refer to God using female pronouns and imagery] ... transformed my relationship with God. For the first time, I understood what it meant to be made in God's image. To think of God as a woman like myself, to see Her as both powerful and nurturing, to see Her imaged with a woman's body, with womb, with breasts – this was an experience of ultimate significance. Was this the relationship that men have had with God for all these millennia? How wonderful to gain access to those feelings and perceptions.

Siddur Nashim was published in 1976 by Naomi Janowitz and Margaret Wenig.

== Personal life ==
She came out as a lesbian in 1986. She divorced her husband Joel Alpert (with whom she has two children, Lynn and Avi), later becoming partners with author Christie Balka.

== Works ==
- Articles by Rebecca Alpert on the Berman Jewish Policy Archive @ NYU Wagner
- Exploring Judaism: A Reconstructionist Approach with Jacob Staub, (Reconstructionist Press, 1985 and rev.ed. 2000)
- Lesbian Rabbis: The First Generation, editor, with Sue Elwell and Shirley Idelson, (Rutgers University Press, 2001)
- Like Bread on the Seder Plate: Jewish Lesbians and the Transformation of Tradition (Columbia University Press, 1997)
- The Life and Thought Of Tehilla Lichtenstein (booklet)
- Voices of the Religious Left: A Contemporary Sourcebook, editor (Temple University Press, 2000)
- Whose Torah?: A Concise Guide to Progressive Judaism (The New Press, 2008)
- Out of Left Field: Jews and Black Baseball (Oxford University Press, 2011)
- Religion and Sports: An Introduction and Case Studies (Columbia University Press, 2015)
- Gods, Games, and Globalization: New Perspectives on Religion and Sport, editor, with Arthur Remillard (Mercer University Press, 2019)
