= Carol Christ =

Carol Christ may refer to:

- Carol T. Christ, scholar of Victorian literature and Chancellor of the University of California, Berkeley
- Carol P. Christ, scholar of feminism and theology
