= Free Women of Spain =

1991 book by Martha Ackelsberg

- Author: Martha Ackelsberg
- Subject: Spanish anarchism, history of feminism
- Genre: History, Political Science, and Feminist Theory
- Publisher: Indiana University Press, AK Press
- Publication date: May 1991
- Pages: 252
- ISBN: 9780253301208
- OCLC: 22180421
- Dewey Decimal: 946.081082 and 335.830820946

Free Women of Spain: Anarchism and the Struggle for the Emancipation of Women is a 1991 historical monograph by Martha Ackelsberg on feminist practices of the Mujeres Libres organization during the Spanish Civil War and Social Revolution.

== Development and writing ==
=== Early arguments ===
During her research, Feminist Studies published Ackelsberg's 1985 essay “‘Separate and equal?’ Mujeres Libres and anarchist strategy for women’s emancipation”, which previewed many of the arguments developed in the later book:

- Leftist organizations gave only nominal support to women's emancipation and thus made "difference" a central political question for Mujeres Libres.
- Mujeres Libres concluded that women seeking to participate in revolutionary activity were in a double struggle against the causes of their own subordination while simultaneously developing the self-consciousness necessary to recognise themselves as significant social actors.
- They rejected the prevailing leftist view that women's emancipation would follow automatically from economic revolution. Instead, they maintained that patriarchy had to be dismantled alongside capitalism.
- They provided training programs to empower women to participate as equal partners in the broader anarchist movement.
- They retained their autonomy so they could address issues specific to women while confronting sexism and masculinist hierarchies within anarchosyndicalist organizations.

=== Further development ===
Ackelsberg began writing the book in 1983 while a fellow at Bunting Institute of Radcliffe College and continued during sabbaticals at other universities, including Columbia University's Institute for Research on Women and Gender (1987–88), culminating in the publication of the book in 1991.

The book was developed during the Spanish Transition, in the years following the death of the dictator Francisco Franco in 1975. Ackelsberg found that her informants were still reluctant to speak, as they felt that the Francoists still held positions of power.

Ackelsberg affirmed that part of her goals for the book was to show that the transformative social activities of the historical anarchist movement in Spain and its opposition to all forms of hierarchy were valuable for feminists in the USA as an alternative to adapting socialist theory.

=== Research ===
Her initial research on the topic lasted around ten years and began indirectly in the late 1970s, while interviewing men who had participated in the collectivizations in Spain during the civil war and asking them how the social revolution had changed male/female relations.

Ackelsberg interviewed surviving members of Mujeres Libres and consulted archives then held by the Spanish military and police forces at the General Archive of the Spanish Civil War in Salamanca. She also undertook intensive archival research at the International Institute of Social History in Amsterdam, the Barcelona archival network, and other university archives and libraries in the US, Spain and France.

She initially encountered reluctance from the male informants, who could not understand her interest in gender studies as “they just didn’t think it mattered — they couldn’t get their minds around it.” Eventually, she established contact with women of the organization who were then living in Spain, France and Canada. Most of them were just 16-20 years old when joining Mujeres Libres and 60-70 years old when interviewed by Ackelsberg.

== Themes ==
The book examines the relationship between anarchist revolution, women's emancipation and revolutionary mobilization, arguing that individual and collective liberation are mutually dependent, and under the perspective that Mujeres Libres sought to develop women's capacity to participate fully in social and political life through education, training and direct action, while addressing the material and personal conditions that restricted their autonomy.

A central theme is the importance of autonomous, self-directed organisation as a means of overcoming their triple enslavement of ignorance, gender equality and capitalism. Mujeres Libres developed initiatives through which women could gain control over aspects of their daily lives, acquire practical skills and assume leadership roles, while maintaining their autonomy from the CNT and the FAI. These practices extended anarchist direct action into education, community life and women's emancipation.

The book also emphasizes the relationship between personal growth and collective transformation. The concept of capacitación — the development of ordinary women's potential through education and training — was central to Mujeres Libres's approach. Their conception of emancipation therefore involved both individual self-development and participation in collective projects, supported by an anarchist critique of domination, subordination and hierarchy.

Rather than treating emancipation as the product of a single political program, the book furthers empowerment, diversity, community-based consciousness raising and networks of autonomous groups. It challenges conventional gendered and class-based definitions of political activity and proposes a broader conception of political participation.

== Reception ==
According to Temma Kaplan, professor emeritus of history at Rutgers University, the book underscores diversity within the membership of Mujeres Libres and argues that activists for social movements should be able to pursue different interests. She adds, "When historians take women's movements and gender differences in organizations —as distinct from feminist institutions— seriously, this book will become part of the canon" .

In Fifth Estate, David Porter, professor emeritus of political science at SUNY/Empire State College, says that the work successfully conveys the intensity of genuine political struggle and draws clear parallels with the contemporary political landscape in North America. It presents a vivid account of an internal revolution within a larger revolutionary framework, while inviting reflection on current circumstances.

Criticisms of the book include its limited discussion of key female Spanish anarchists such as Teresa Claramunt and Teresa Mañe “Soledad Gustavo”, despite their importance in the movement. It has also been criticized for not mentioning anarcha-feminism, not even when explicitly trying to assess Mujeres Libres' legacy for contemporary anarchism.

Finally, Spanish academic literature tends to treat Ackelsberg's book as complementary to, rather than superseding, Mary Nash's earlier and more extensive Spanish-language scholarship on Mujeres Libres and women in Spanish anarchism (Nash's Mujeres Libres, España 1936–1939 from 1975, and Rojas, from 1999).

== Publication ==
The book was first published in 1991 by Indiana University Press in the United States as a hardcover and as an eBook.

- Ackelsberg, Martha A., Free Women of Spain: Anarchism and the Struggle for the Emancipation of Women, Indiana University Press, May 1991, ISBN 9780253301208 (hardcover), ISBN 9780253116178 (eBook), 252 pp

In 2004 AK Press acquired the rights and produced a paperback edition in Canada with a new preface.

- Ackelsberg, Martha A., Free Women of Spain: Anarchism and the Struggle for the Emancipation of Women, AK Press, Jan 6 2004, ISBN 9781902593968 (paperback), 230 pp

It has been translated and published in:

- Italy by Zero in Condotta as Mujeres Libres: L'attualità della lotta delle donne anarchiche nella rivoluzione spagnola, (2005), no ISBN or ISSN
- France by Atelier de création libertaire as La vie sera mille fois plus belle: Les Mujeres libres, les anarchistes espagnols et l'émancipation des femmes, (2010), ISBN 9782351040379
- Spain by Virus as Mujeres Libres: El anarquismo y la lucha por la emancipación de las mujeres, (2017), including a new prologue, ISBN 9788492559794 (paperback)
- Greece by Ελευθεριακές Εκδόσεις Ναυτίλος (Nautilos Libertarian Editions) as Mujeres Libres, Οι ελεύθερες γυναίκες στην Ισπανία, (2018) ISBN 9786188196377
- Brazil by Elefante as Mulheres Livres: a luta pela emancipação feminina e a Guerra Civil Espanhola, (2019), ISBN 9788593115394
- Russia by Радикальная теория и практика (Radical Theory and Practice) as Mujeres Libres. Свободные женщины Испании (2020), no ISBN or ISSN

== Bibliography ==
- Ackelsberg, Martha A (1985). "'Separate and Equal'? Mujeres Libres and Anarchist Strategy for Women's Emancipation". Feminist Studies. 11 (1): 63–83. doi:10.2307/3180133. JSTOR 3180133 – via JSTOR.
- Ackelsberg, Martha A. (January 6, 2004). Free Women of Spain: Anarchism and the Struggle for the Emancipation of Women (PDF) (9781902593968 ed.). AK Press.
- Ayguavives Arch, Mónica (2014). Mujeres Libres: Reclaiming Their Predecessors, Their Feminism and the Voice of Women in the Spanish Civil War History (PDF) (master's degree in Women's and Gender Studies thesis). Budapest: Central European University.
- Bernecker, Walther L. (1995). "Review of 'Las cenizas del Fénix. La cultura española en los años 30'. (Colección Nuestro Mundo, 30); 'La prensa de guerra en la zona republicana durante la guerra civil española (1936-1939)'. 3 tomos. (Colección Nuestro Mundo, 27-29); 'Free Women of Spain. Anarchism and the Struggle for the Emancipation of Women'". Notas: Reseñas iberoamericanas. Literatura, sociedad, historia. 2 (1 (4)): 119–123. ISSN 0945-8301. JSTOR 43111965.
- DeWitt, Rebecca (1977). "Interview with Martha Ackelsberg: Anarchist Scholarship and Feminist Critique" (PDF). Perspectives on Anarchist Theory. 1 (1). Albany NY: The Institute for Anarchist Studies. ISSN 1715-7552.
- Espigado Tocino, Gloria (March 15, 2002). "Las mujeres en el anarquismo español (1869-1939)" [Women in Spanish anarchism (1869-1939)]. Ayer. Revista de Historia Contemporánea (in Spanish). 45 (1): 39–72.
- García, Ter (September 17, 2017). "'Las diferencias de género siempre se dejan para otro momento'" [Gender differences are always put off until later]. El Salto (newspaper) (in Spanish). ISSN 2530-5913.
- Iñiguez de Heredia, Marta (2007). "History and actuality of Anarcha-feminism: Lessons from Spain". Lilith: A Feminist History Journal (16). Fitzroy, Vic: Anu Press: 42–56. ISSN 2652-8436.
- Kaplan, Temma (1993). "Review of Free Women of Spain: Anarchism and the Struggle for the Emancipation of Women". The American Historical Review. 98 (1): 187. doi:10.2307/2166461. ISSN 0002-8762. JSTOR 2166461.
- Masià, Carles (July 11, 2012). "El problema dels rols continua existint" [Role problems continue to exist]. La Directa (in Catalan). No. 281. pp. 4–5. ISSN 3081-4634.
- Porter, David (Spring 1992). "Free Women of Spain: The Roots of Anarcha-Feminism". Fifth Estate (periodical). No. 339. ISSN 0015-0800.
- Vicinus, Martha; Rosenfelt, Deborah. "Preface" (PDF). Feminist Studies. 11 (1): 3–5. ISSN 0046-3663.
