= Siddur Nashim =

1976 prayer book

Siddur Nashim: A Sabbath Prayer Book for Women
- Author: Naomi Janowitz and Margaret Wenig
- Language: English
- Genre: Prayer Book
- Publication date: 1976

Siddur Nashim: A Sabbath Prayer Book for Women is a feminist siddur written in 1976 by Naomi Janowitz and Margaret Wenig of the Brown University Women's Minyan. It is the first siddur to use female imagery and pronouns to refer to God.

== About ==
Written by Margaret Wenig and Naomi Janowitz while college students, members of the Brown University Women's Minyan, the siddur is entirely in English. It follows the general order of the Shabbat service, while adding original psalms and a prayer about menstruation. Because the siddur was considered controversial, it was never formally published on the decision of its authors, and copies are only available from Rabbi Wenig. Selections of the siddur have been printed as "Sabbath Prayers for Women" in Carol P. Christ and Judith Plaskow's 1979 book Womanspirit Rising: A Feminist Reader in Religion.

== See also ==
- Jewish feminism
- Feminist theology
