= Valerie Saiving =

American theologian (1921–1992)

Valerie Saiving (1921–1992) was a feminist theologian. She was one of the early pioneers of feminist theological reflection named Thealogy, known for her groundbreaking 1960 essay The Human Situation: A Feminine View. In it, she challenged dominant Christian conceptions of sin as rooted in male experience, arguing that women often face different moral and existential concerns, such as self-negation and relational over-identification.

Saiving taught at Hobart and William Smith Colleges in Geneva, New York, from 1959 to 1987, where she helped establish both the Department of Religious Studies and the Women's Studies program. Her work is now recognized as a foundational contribution to the development of feminist theology.

== Biographical details ==
Valerie Saiving Goldstein was born in 1921, and received her BA from Bates College, Maine, United States in 1943, studying both theology and psychology. Her University of Chicago Divinity School PhD thesis, The Concepts of Individuality in Whitehead’s Metaphysics, was published in 1966. She was co-founder of the Department of Religious Studies and of the Women's Studies programme at Hobart and William Smith Colleges, Geneva, New York State, where she taught from 1959 to 1987. She died in 1992.

In 1960, she published an 18-page article in The Journal of Religion, entitled The Human Situation: A Feminine View. She critiqued contemporary theology largely by means of psychological observations, noting that, whereas little girls learn that they will grow up — just by waiting — to be women, boys on the other hand learn that to be men they must "do something about it. Mere waiting is not enough; to be a man, a boy must prove himself and go on proving himself."

The article had substantial influence on subsequent feminist theologians. Mary Daly, for example, cited her in her work The Church and the Second Sex, while Judith Plaskow both published a dissertation on Saiving's essay (entitled Sex, Sin and Grace: Women's Experience and the Theologies of Reinhold Niebuhr and Paul Tillich) and reproduced the 1960 article in her 1979 anthology Womanspirit Rising: A Feminist Reader in Religion.

== The Human Situation: A Feminine View ==
The crux of Saiving's argument in the article is that the focus on pride characteristic of traditional Christian interpretations of sin reflects male experience in a way that is inappropriate to the experience of most, if not all, women, who are much more likely to be prone to "triviality, distractibility, and diffuseness; lack of an organizing center or focus; dependence on others for one's self-definition; tolerance at the expense of standards of excellence ... in short, underdevelopment or negation of the Self."

Fundamentally, Saiving's essay proposes a radical re-definition of 'sin'; one that correctly addresses the female experience. Christianity's view of salvation as a result of selflessness is seen as potentially proscriptive of women who need, in Saiving's opinion, to be encouraged rather than discouraged from asserting themselves as individuals.

Overall, Saiving wished to, "...awaken theologians to the fact that the situation of women, however similar it may appear on the surface of our contemporary world to the situation of man and however much it may be echoed in the life of individual men, is, at bottom, quite different - that the specifically feminine dilemma is, in fact, precisely the opposite of the masculine" (1979, 39). Saiving's work, while much respected in feminist theology, continues to be largely ignored by mainstream theologians.
