= Sharon Kleinbaum =

American rabbi

Member of the United States Commission on International Religious Freedom
- In office 2019–2023
- Appointed by: Chuck Schumer

Personal details
- Born: 1959 (age 66–67) Rutherford, New Jersey, U.S.
- Spouse(s): Margaret Wenig (m. 2008, divorced) Randi Weingarten (m. 2018)
- Education: Barnard College (BA); Reconstructionist Rabbinical College (Semikhah)

Sharon Kleinbaum (born 1959) is an American rabbi who served as spiritual leader of Congregation Beit Simchat Torah in New York City for thirty-two years. She was appointed the synagogue's first senior rabbi emerita. She has actively campaigned for human rights and civil marriage for gay couples.

On July 30, 2021, then-President Joe Biden announced plans to appoint Kleinbaum to the United States Commission on International Religious Freedom.

== Early life and education ==
Kleinbaum was born and raised in Rutherford, New Jersey. She is a 1977 graduate of the Frisch School and graduated, cum laude, from Barnard College with a degree in political science in 1981. While at Barnard College, she led protests against Barnard's investments in South Africa and against the proliferation of nuclear weapons. She is openly lesbian and has two daughters. She received her ordination from the Reconstructionist Rabbinical College in 1990. Kleinbaum has also studied at the Hebrew University of Jerusalem and at the Oxford Centre for Hebrew and Jewish Studies. She is a member of the Central Conference of American Rabbis and the Reconstructionist Rabbinical Association.

== Career ==
Kleinbaum was installed as CBST's first rabbi in 1992. She is a prominent advocate for human rights.

In 1995, Kleinbaum, along with Rabbi Margaret Wenig and Russell Pearce, sent a resolution asking for support for civil marriage for gay couples to the Reform movement's Commission on Social Action; when it was approved by them, Wenig submitted it to the Central Conference of American Rabbis, which approved it in 1996.

Kleinbaum served on Mayor Bloomberg's Commission on Lesbian, Gay, Bisexual, Transgender and Questioning (LGBTQ) Runaway and Homeless Youth and New York Police Department's LGBT Advisory Committee (2009-2010). Kleinbaum has also served on Mayor de Blasio's Transition Committee (2013–2014), and the U.S. Department of State's Religion and Foreign Policy Working Group Sub-working Group on Social Justice (2014). Appointed by Senator Chuck Schumer, she served as a commissioner for the United States Commission on International Religious Freedom from 2019 to 2020. She also served on New York City's Commission on Human Rights, Mayor de Blasio's Faith Based Advisory Council, the board of New York Jewish Agenda, the New Sanctuary Coalition of New York, and was on the board of the New Israel Fund (NIF). Rabbi Kleinbaum serves on the Executive Committees of Governor Hochul’s Office of Faith and Non-Profit Development Services and the New York State Interfaith Council (NYSIC).

== Personal life ==
She married Rabbi Margaret Wenig in 2008. They later divorced. Kleinbaum married Randi Weingarten on March 25, 2018.

== Awards ==
Kleinbaum was named one of the 50 most influential rabbis in America by Newsweek for several years, as well as one of Newsweek's 150 Women Who Shake the World. She was also named one of the Top 10 Women Religious Leaders and one of the 15 Inspiring LGBT Religious Leaders by the Huffington Post. She has also been named one of the country's top 50 Jewish leaders by the Forward and the New York Jewish Week, as well as being named one of Forward's Sisterhood 50 American Influential Rabbis and AM New York named her one of New York City's Most Influential Women for Women's Day. Kleinbaum is a recipient of the Jewish Fund for Justice Woman of Valor Award.

In December 2024, Sharon Kleinbaum was included on the BBC's 100 Women list.

Other awards she has received include:

- New York City Comptroller Elizabeth Holtzman's award for her leadership and courage in the fight for lesbian and gay rights.
- Hetrick-Martin Emery Award, 1996.
- Reconstructionist Rabbinical College Board of Governors Award, 1997.
- New York City Comptroller Alan G. Hevesi's award for her leadership and dedication to safeguarding the rights of lesbians and gay men, 1998.
- Jewish Fund for Justice's "Woman of Valor", 2000.
- The Lavender Light: Black and People of All Colors, Lesbian and Gay Gospel Choir Warriors of Faith Award, 2006.
- Grand Marshal for Heritage of Pride Gay Pride March, 2007.
- LGBT Center's Women's Event Community Leader Award, 2009.
- The Reconstructionist Rabbinical College's Keter Shem Tov Award, 2012.
- Jews For Racial and Economic Justice's (JFREJ's) Rabbi Marshall T. Meyer Risk Taker Award, 2014.
- The Parity Award: Lifetime of Activism and Leadership, 2016.
- The Islamic Center at New York University: Visionary Award, 2017.
- The Auburn Seminary Lives of Commitment Award, 2017.
- Muslim Community Network 2018.

== Articles and books ==
- Kleinbaum, Sharon (2021). "Two Days After the U.S. Capitol is Attacked". In Knopf, Michael Rose; Aniel, Miriam (eds.). No Time for Neutrality: American Rabbinic Voices from an Era of Upheaval. ISBN 979-8737101305.
- Rabbi Mike Moskowitz (March 24, 2021). Moskowitz, Mike; Kleinbaum, Sharon (eds.). Chaver Up!: 49 Rabbis Explore What it Means to be an Ally through a Jewish Lens. Congregation Beit Simchat Torah. ISBN 979-8727433546.
- "The Work of Repairing the World: Resilience and Failing (in Order) to Succeed", Moral Resistance and Spiritual Authority: Our Jewish Obligation to Social Justice (Central Conference of American Rabbis, 2019).
- “When Is Our Reichstag Fire Coming, And Will We Be Prepared For It?” by Rabbi Sharon Kleinbaum, Huffington Post, March 1, 2017.
- "Post Election Sermon", WHAT WE DO NOW: Standing Up for Your Values in Trump's America (Melville House, January 2017)
- Foreword: Changing Lives, Making History: Congregation Beit Simchat Torah (Congregation Beit Simchat Torah, 2014).
- Editor: Siddur B'chol L'vav'cha (Congregation Beit Simchat Torah, 2007).
- Listening for the Oboe (Congregation Beth Simchat Torah, 2005).
- Synagogue as Spiritual Community (Congregation Beth Simchat Torah, 2001).
- "Bully Me" in It Gets Better: Coming Out, Overcoming Bullying, and Creating a Life Worth Living, edited by Dan Savage and Terry Miller, Dutton Adult (March 22, 2011).
- "Do Not Hold Back: Notes from a Gay Congregation" by Rabbi Sharon Kleinbaum, Tikkun, p. 51, Winter 2011.
- "Supporting Our Muslim Neighbors in the New Year" by Rabbi Sharon Kleinbaum, Gay City News, September 15, 2010.
- "Signs of Faith, 'God Hates Hate'" by Rabbi Sharon Kleinbaum, The Advocate.com, June 25, 2009.
- "Overcoming Prejudice" in Conscience 27. (2006).
- "What Now? After the Exodus, the Wilderness" from Women's Passover Companion: Women's Reflections on the Festival of Freedom edited by Rabbi Sharon Cohen Anisfeld, Tara Mohr and Catherine Spector, Jewish Lights Pub; (February 2003).
- Essay in Rabbis: The Many Faces of Judaism: 100 Unexpected Photographs of Rabbis With Essays in Their Own Words (Universe Publishing 2002).
- "There's a Place for Us: Gays and Lesbians in the Jewish Community" by Rabbis Sharon A. Kleinbaum and Rabbi Margaret Moers Wenig, Life Lights (Jewish Lights Publishing, 2002).
- "Gay and Lesbian Synagogue as Spiritual Community" in the anthology Lesbian Rabbis: The First Generation edited by Rebecca R. Alpert, Sue Levi Elwell and Shirley Idelson (Rutgers University Press 2001).
- "Memo to Clinton: Gays and Lesbians", Rabbi Sharon Kleinbaum, Tikkun Magazine, Vol. 8, January 1993.
- "An Eye for an Eye, A Tooth for a Tooth" in Reconstructionist Autumn 1992.
- "Responses to the Destruction: A Look at Some Rabbinic Texts" in Reconstructionist July–August 1990.

== Filmography ==
Films that Rabbi Kleinbaum is featured in

- Everything Relative (1996) written and directed by Sharon Pollock.
- Ruthie and Connie: Every Room in the House (2002) Directed by Deborah Dickson. With Ruthie Berman and Connie Kurtz.
- Jerusalem is Proud to Present (2008) A film by Nitzan Gilady, Producer: Galia Bador.
- Grace Paley: Collected Shorts (2009) A film by Lilly Rivlin.
