= Gender and religion =

Gender and religion is the study of gender within various religious traditions. It is the influence of religion on gender roles, economics, culture, politics and other roles women and men engage within religion and within societies at large.

Religious traditions differ in their beliefs, traditions and practices regarding gender. Deities, spirits and other theological beings may be depicted as either possessing or lacking a gender. In some religious communities, women are allowed to serve in leadership roles, being ordained as priests, rabbis or imams, while other religious communities forbid women from performing in those roles. Religious beliefs and institutions also influence wider societal debates relating to gender, sex and sexuality, including the morality and legality of abortion, divorce, sexuality, and the role of transgender people.

These differences around gender and sex can be classified as either "internal" or "external". Internal religious issues are studied from the perspective of a given religion, and might include religious beliefs and practices about the roles and rights of men and women in government, education and worship; beliefs about the sex or gender of deities and religious figures; and beliefs about the origin and meaning of human gender. External religious issues can be broadly defined as an examination of a given religion from an outsider's perspective, including possible clashes between religious leaders and laity; and the influence of, and differences between, religious perspectives on social issues.

== Gender of deities ==
The earliest documented religions, and some contemporary animist religions, involve the deification of characteristics of the natural world. These spirits are typically, but not always, gendered. It has been proposed, since the 19th century, that polytheism arose out of animism, as religious epic provided personalities to autochthonous animist spirits in various parts of the world, notably in the development of ancient near eastern and Indo-European literature. Polytheistic gods are also typically gendered. The earliest evidence of monotheism is the worship of Aten in Egypt, the teaching of Moses in the Torah and Zoroastrianism in Persia. Aten, Yahweh, and Ahura Mazda are all masculine deities, embodied only in metaphor, so masculine rather than reproductively male.

=== Hinduism ===
Kali, the Hindu goddess of both the life cycle and destructive war, breaks the gender role of women representing love, sex, fertility, and beauty. Saraswati, is another Hindu goddess who breaks this gender role, and is recognized as the goddess of learning, music, and the arts. Saraswati is also respected by many students and artists that are looking to learn more and create more.

=== Christianity ===
In Christianity, Jesus is believed to have become incarnate as a human male. Christians have traditionally believed that God the Father has masculine gender rather than male sex because the Father has never been incarnated. By contrast, there is less historical consensus on the gender of the Holy Spirit.

In Christianity the gender of God is referenced several times throughout the KJV Bible. One point of reference for God being male is found in the Gospel of John when Jesus Christ says to Mary Magdalene, "Touch me not; for I am not yet ascended to my Father: but go to my brethren, and say unto them, I ascend unto my Father, and your Father; and to my God, and your God."

=== Islam ===
In Islam, God is not gendered literally or metaphorically. God is referred to with the masculine pronoun in Arabic [Huwa or 'He'], as there is no neuter in the Arabic language. Ascribing natural gender to God is considered heretical because God is described as incomparable to creation. The Quran says: There is nothing like Him, and He ˹alone˺ is the All-Hearing, All-Seeing.

In contrast to Christian theology, Jesus is viewed as a prophet rather than a human male incarnation of God, and the primary sources of Islam [the Quran and Sunnah] do not refer to God as the 'Father'.

== Creation myths about human gender ==
In many stories, man and woman are created at the same time, with equal standing. One example is the creation story in Genesis 1: "And God created the man in his image. In the image of God he created him. Male and female he created them." Some commentators interpret the parallelism to be deliberately stressing that mankind is, in some sense, a "unity in diversity" from a divine perspective (compare e pluribus unum), and that women as well as men are included in God's image. The first man, Adam, has been viewed as a spiritual being or an ideal who can be distinguished as both male and female; an androgynous being with no sex. Pierre Chaunu argues that Genesis' gender-inclusive conception of humanity contrasts sharply with the views of gender found in older literature from surrounding cultures, and suggests a higher status of women in western society due to Judæo-Christian influence, and based on this verse. Some scholars, such as Philo, argue that the "sexes" were developed through an accidental division of the "true self" which existed prior to being assigned with gender.

In other accounts, man is created first, followed by woman. This is the case in the creation account of Genesis 2, where the first woman (Eve) is created from the rib of the first man (Adam), as a companion and helper. This story about Adam and Eve shows that God created two genders, a woman from a man. God also told the woman that she can only desire the man and that he shall rule over her. This is the earliest idea in catholic religion that says women should only be attracted and loyal to men, therefore supporting the claim that there is only a woman for a man. These two gender creation stories imagine the ideal of the unitary self. However, the unitary self is either androgynous or physically male; both of which are masculine in configuration.

In Plato's Symposium, Aristophanes provides an account to explain gender and romantic attraction. There were originally three sexes: the all-male, the all-female, and the "androgynous", who was half man, half woman. As punishment for attacking the gods, each was split in half. The halves of the androgynous being became heterosexual men and women, while the halves of the all-male and all-female became gays and lesbians, respectively.

== Leadership roles ==
Some religions restrict leadership to males. The ordination of women has been a controversial issue in some religions where either the rite of ordination, or the role that an ordained person fulfills, has traditionally been restricted to men because of cultural or theological prohibitions.

The journey to religious leadership presents distinct challenges for women across various faith traditions. Historically, many religious institutions have been dominated by male leadership, and this has influenced the roles and opportunities available to women. For instance, women are not permitted to become priests in the Catholic Church, and in Orthodox Judaism, the role of a rabbi is traditionally reserved for men. While Islam does permit women to serve as religious leaders, they are typically not allowed to lead mixed-gender prayers. In Hinduism, some sects or regions allow women to become priests, though this remains a rarity.

While many significant religious organizations in the U.S. ordain women and permit them to hold leadership positions, few women have served at the highest levels. For instance, the Episcopal Church had a woman, Katharine Jefferts Schori, serving as presiding bishop from 2006 to 2015. However, many of the largest denominations in the U.S., such as the Roman Catholic Church and the Southern Baptist Convention, do not ordain women or allow them to hold top church leadership roles. Efforts have been made in recent decades to challenge these norms. For example, while roughly six-in-ten American Catholics (59%) in a 2015 Pew Research Center survey expressed support for ordaining women in their church, the official stance remains unchanged.

This underrepresentation underscores the broader societal challenges women face in asserting their leadership in traditionally male-dominated spheres. As the discourse around gender equality continues to evolve, it's crucial to understand and address the systemic barriers that women encounter in religious leadership.

Beginning in the 19th century, some Christian denominations have ordained women. Among those who do not, many believe it is forbidden by 1 Timothy 2. Some of those denominations ordain women to the diaconate, believing this is encouraged by 1 Timothy 3–4.

Some Islamic communities (mainly outside the Middle East) have recently appointed women as imams, normally with ministries restricted to leading women in prayer and other charitable ministries.

=== Indian religions ===
Hinduism, has the strongest presence of the divine feminine among major world religions, from ancient times to the present. Both masculine and feminine deities feature prominently in Hinduism. The identity of the Vedic writers is not known, but the first hymn of the Rigveda is addressed to the masculine deity Agni, and the pantheon of the Vedas is dominated by masculine gods. The most prominent Avatars of Vishnu are men. However, the Devi Sukta hymn of the Rigveda declares feminine energy to be the essence of the universe, the one who creates all matter and consciousness, the eternal and infinite, the metaphysical and empirical reality (Brahman), and the soul (Ātman) of everything.

Mostly, the traditional religious leaders of Jainism are men. The 19th tirthankara (traditional leader) Māllīnātha in this half cycle was female.

Siddhartha Gautama (the Buddha) was a man, but the female Buddha Vajrayogini also plays a role in Buddhism. In some East Asian Buddhist communities, a number of women are ordained as monks as well.

=== Abrahamic religions ===
In Abrahamic religions, Abraham himself, Moses, David and Elijah are among the most significant leaders documented according to the traditions of the Hebrew Bible. John the Baptist, Jesus and his apostles, and Saul of Tarsus again give the New Testament an impression of the founders and key figures of Christianity being male dominated. They were followed by a millennium of theologians known as the Church Fathers. Islam was founded by Muhammad, and his successor Abu Bakr, Umar, Uthman ibn Affan and Ali, for Sunnis and Ali ibn Abi Talib and The Twelve Imams for those of Shia faith, were also men. On the other hand, The Virgin Mary, the mother of Jesus of Nazareth, is not associated with leadership or teaching, but is nonetheless a key figure in Catholicism. Fatimah, daughter of Muhammad, is regarded by Muslims as an exemplar for men and women.

The Baháʼí Faith, a fast growing religion, teaches that men and women are equal. Prominent women celebrated in Baháʼí history include Bahíyyih Khánum, who acted head of the faith for several periods during the ministries of `Abdu'l-Bahá and Shoghi Effendi, and Táhirih, who is also held by Baháʼís as a penultimate leader. Women serve in higher percentages of leadership in appointed and elected national and international institutions of the religion than in the general population. However, only men are allowed to be members of the religion's highest governing body, the Universal House of Justice.

Nakayama Miki was the founder of Tenrikyo, which may be the largest religion to have a woman founder. Ellen G. White was instrumental to the founding of the Seventh-day Adventist Church and is officially considered a prophet by Seventh-day Adventists.

== Segregation ==
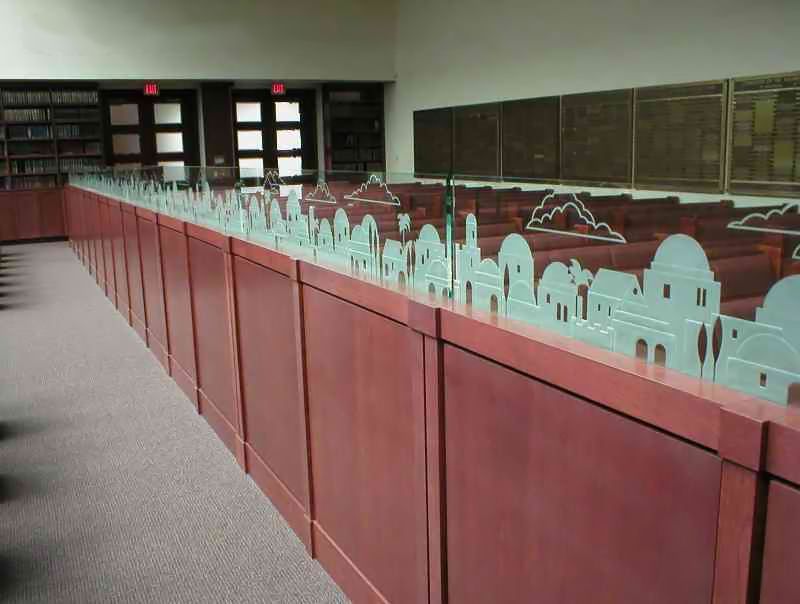
A mechitza in Livingston, New Jersey

Many religions have traditionally practiced sex segregation.

In traditional Jewish synagogues, the women's section is separated from the men's section by a wall or curtain called a mechitza. Men are not permitted to pray in the presence of women, to prevent distraction. The mechitza shown in the picture on the right is one in a synagogue affiliated with the 'left wing' (more modern side) of Modern Orthodox Judaism, which requires the mechitza to be of the height shown in the picture. More traditional or 'right wing' Modern Orthodox Judaism, and all forms of Haredi Judaism, require the mechitza to be of a type which absolutely prevents the men from seeing the women.

Enclosed religious orders are usually segregated by gender.

Sex segregation in Islam includes guidelines on interaction between men and women. Men and women also worship in different areas in most mosques. Both men and women cover their awra when in the presence of members of the opposite sex (who are not close relations).

== Roles in marriage ==
Nearly all religions recognize marriage, and many religions also promote views on appropriate gender roles within marriage.

=== Christianity ===
Within Christianity, the two notable views on gender roles in a marriage are complementarianism and egalitarianism. The complementarian view of marriage is widely accepted in Christianity, where the husband is viewed as the leader and the wife is viewed as the follower. Essentially, the man is given more of a headship role and the woman is viewed as a supporting partner. In Genesis 3, Adam named his wife Eve ("life") because she "was the mother of all living" (Genesis 3:20).

In mainstream Christian tradition, the relationship between a husband and wife is believed to mirror the relationship between Christ and the Church. This can be seen in Ephesians 5:25:

Husbands love their wives, just as Christ loved the Church and gave himself up for her.

Christian traditionalists believe that men are meant to be living martyrs for their wives, "giving himself up for her" daily and through acts of unselfish love. The women, on the other hand, are meant to be their helpers.

While complementarianism has been the norm for years, some Christians have moved toward egalitarian views. As the nature of gender roles within societies changes, religious views on gender roles in marriage change as well.

In complementarianism, the relationship between man and woman is compared to the one between Christ and the Church. In the way Christ loved and cared for the Church, a man is expected to do the same for his wife. Brown says that this is what makes a marriage a holy union, rather than a simple contract between the two.

According to Paul, husbands and wives had rights that they could expect from each other. After the death of their husband, women are expected to not marry again because, on the day of resurrection, no one will 'claim' her as their wife.

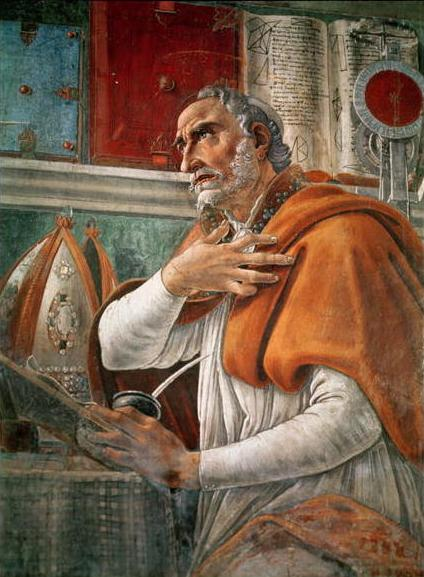
Augustine, a Christian philosopher, shared his beliefs on marriage and the importance of virginity in Christianity.

Marriage, according to Augustine, is a second resort to not being able to remain celibate and a virgin. The role of virginity is one that heavily impacts marriage in general according to Augustine. Virginity and celibacy are extremely important ideals that Christians must carry, but they can marry if they cannot do so. Within a marriage, women were predicted to be more likely to be unfaithful. This left the task of being sure that the wife remained faithful to the husband. Augustine states that although men have dominance over women, they must implement it with compassion and love.

In relation to Augustine's views on marriage and virginity, some women preferred the celibate lifestyle in order to gain freedom from male control. Dennis R. Macdonald estimated that groups of widows and unmarried virgins had an impact on the patriarchal society. Researchers believe that, from a sex and gender view, remaining a virgin was a form of rebellion against male domination. The most direct way for men to dominate women was through marriage, and in remaining celibate, these women did not have that domination over them.

=== Judaism ===
In traditional Judaism, women are for the most part seen as separate but equal. According to traditional Judaism, women are endowed with a greater degree of "binah" (intuition, understanding, intelligence) than men. Eishet Chayil says about an ideal wife, "Piha patcha b’chochma", she opens her mouth in wisdom, and "batach ba lev baala", her husband trusts her judgment. According to the Talmud in Tactate Bava Metzia "A person must always be careful about mistreatment of his wife. Since her tear is easily elicited, punishment for her mistreatment is immediate.". Women have no legal obligations to marry, and have considerably less obligations with regard to Mitzvah in Orthodox Judaism.

=== Islam ===
In Islam, a woman's primary responsibility is usually interpreted as fulfilling her role as a wife and mother, whereas women still have the right and are free to work. A man's role is to work and be able to protect and financially support his wife and family.

In regards to guidelines in marriage, a man is allowed to marry a Muslim, Jewish, Sabaean, or Christian woman whereas a woman is only allowed to marry a Muslim man. Both genders cannot marry nonbelievers or polytheists.

The matter of divorce is discussed in verse 2:228 of the Qu'ran. The Qu'ran instructs women to wait at least three menstrual periods, called Iddah, before committing to a second marriage. The purpose of the Iddah is to ensure that a woman's pregnancy will be linked to the correct biological father. In the case of a Talāq, which is a divorce initiated by the man, the man is supposed to announce the words "I divorce you" aloud three times, each separated by a three-month waiting period. Certain practices of the Talāq divorce allows the "I divorce you" utterance to be completed in one sitting; however, the concept of "Triple Divorce" in one sitting is considered wrong in some branches of Islam such as with the Shia Muslims. During the three-month waiting period, only the man has the right to initiate a marital reunion if both sides desire to reconcile. This yields a gender equality perspective in the sense that women have power over men in regards to finance parallel to how men have power over women in regards to obedience, both of which are only valid to a reasonable extent. While a Ṭalāq can be completed easily, a divorce that is initiated by the woman, called a Khula, is harder to obtain due to a woman's requirement to repay her dowry and give up child custody. More specifically, a woman is to give up custody of her child if the child is over the age of seven. If a woman gains custody of her child who is under the age of seven, she must still forfeit custody upon the child's seventh birthday. Although the Islamic religion requires the woman to repay her dowry, she is also entitled to receive financial support from her former husband if needed. This cycle of financial matters protects the woman's property from being taken advantage of during or after marriage. The Qu'ran gives importance to fairness and patience during divorce and also emphasizes on sorting it out if possible without getting a divorce. It says that even though divorce or khula is permitted it should be the last resort after all the efforts of making peace has been made. “If they both desire reconciliation, Allah will cause it between them” (Qur’an 4:35). Many muslim countries in the modern world have adapted to legal forms to allow the divorce to be more gender-equitable. This allows women to sign up for divorce through the court without losing all financial rights.

== Gender and religious expressions ==
The manner in which individuals express and experience their religious convictions is profoundly shaped by gender. Experts from diverse disciplines such as theology, sociology, anthropology, and gender studies have delved into the effects of gender on religious politics and societal standards. At times, the interplay between gender and religion can confine gender roles, but in other instances, it can empower and uphold them. Such insights shed light on the ways religious doctrines and rituals can simultaneously uphold specific gender expectations and offer avenues for gender expression. Furthermore, gender plays a notable role in patterns of religious conversion. According to the Pew Research Center, an estimated 83.4% of women worldwide identify with a faith group, compared to 79.9% of men. While specific conversion trends, such as women's inclination towards Christianity or men's propensity for conversion in Islam, can vary, it's essential to approach these patterns with an understanding that individual choices are influenced by a myriad of personal, cultural, and societal factors.

== Cultural effects on religious practice ==
Religious worship may vary by individual due to differing cultural experiences of gender.

=== Greco-Roman Paganism ===
Both men and women who practiced paganism in ancient civilizations such as Rome and Greece worshiped male and female deities, but goddesses played a much larger role in women's lives. Roman and Greek goddesses' domains often aligned with culturally specific gender expectations at the time which served to perpetrate them in many cases. One such expectation of women was to marry at a relatively young age. The quadrennial Bear Festival, known as Arkteia, was held on the outskirts of Athens in honor of Artemis and involved girls ages seven to fourteen. The girls would compete in public athletic events as Greek men sat as onlookers, observing potential wives.

Demeter, the goddess of fertility, was a prominent deity due to women's ability to relate to her. The myth surrounding Demeter involves her losing her daughter, Persephone, against her will to Hades and the grief she experiences after the event. Mother-daughter relationships were very important to ancient Greeks. The severance of this relationship by fathers and husbands created much strain in young women who were forced to leave their mothers, submit to their husbands, and yield to the patriarchal society. Demeter was honored through female-exclusive ceremonies in various rituals due to her general disdain for the behaviors of men. Aphrodite, too, was honored by similar means. To women during this time period, the thought of Aphrodite's attitude toward males was comforting as she refused to answer to any mortal man, exhibiting the control that mortal women desired to have in their own lives.

The Phrygian cult of Cybele (known as Magna Mater in Rome) held a unique practice within Roman culture. The cult utilized eunuch priests known as the Galli for ritual and religious cultivation. These priests were described to wear jewelry and clothes of women, texts commonly referred to them as semiviri or half-men. Though the Magna Mater was adopted by Roman society, the practice of the Galli was heavily associated with a foreign eastern tradition. Within the revitalization of moral legislation and familial virtue of the early empire, Roman interpretation of masculinity changed. Within the early empire, Dionysius of Halicarnassus referenced a law which states that no Roman is permitted to walk or participate in processions with the Galli on account of hesitance of foreign customs. The claim of if native Romans could participate in Galli practices is uncertain, however.

== Religious teachings on gender-related issues ==
=== Clothing ===
Within many religions, there are traditional clothing standards unique to each culture. One aspect that every religion might have in common is modesty. However, every religion look up to modesty in a different way which not necessarily mean covering up or having expectations from woman in any way. In some religions, both men and women follow modest dress codes whereas in others they tend to follow culture more than their religion.

The Book of Deuteronomy asserts that "A woman shall not wear a man's garment, nor shall a man put on a woman's cloak, for whoever does these things is an abomination to the Lord your God." The book intends to set a specific idea of what a man and women should, and should not wear based on their gender, or they will disappoint the Lord. In religion, this is a way to clearly show a gender divide through the idea of individuals should only wear their gender specific clothing in order to meet the religions standards. God's response to the idea of his creations cross dressing, influences the negative opinion towards transgender individuals.

=== Abortion ===
Abortion is one of many gender related issues among different religions. In many religions, abortion is considered immoral.

The Catholic Church recognizes conception as the beginning of a human life, thus abortion is prohibited under all circumstances. However, according to the Second Vatican Council, women who have had an abortion but are willing to commit to the right of life are ensured forgiveness. The Catholic Church has thoroughly fought the legalization of abortion and has expressed a pro-life stance on the issue.

Regular church attendance has been shown to correlate with a higher attitude against abortion. This means that more church-goers than non-church-goers are pro-life.

In Hinduism, it is a woman's human duty to produce offspring, thus having an abortion is a violation of that duty. The Vedas, which are age-old sacred Sanskrit texts, suggests that abortion is more sinful than killing a priest or one's own parents. The practice of a woman having an abortion is deemed as unacceptable in the Hindu community, both socially and morally.

On the other hand, some religions recognize that abortion is acceptable only in some circumstances. Mormons believe the act of having an abortion is troublesome and destructive; however, health risks and complications, rape, and closely mating with relatives are the only situations in which abortion is not considered a sin.

=== Homosexuality ===
Homosexuality is expressly forbidden in many religions, but typically in casuistic rather than apodictic laws. As such, the rationale for such proscriptions is not clearly evident, though avoidance of procreation and contribution to society via establishing families are sometimes offered as pragmatic considerations.

In general, homosexuality is perceived as sinful in conservative movements, while fully accepted in liberal movements. For example, the Southern Baptist Christian denomination and Islamic community consider homosexuality a sin, whereas the American Baptist denomination perceives homosexuality on an inclusive scale.

=== Transgender identities ===
Different religions around the world treat transgender individuals differently, and views regarding transgender people and their connection to different religions vary widely among individuals.

==== Paganism and Neo-paganism ====
Many Pagan religions place an emphasis on female divine energy which is manifested as The Goddess. The consensus is unclear on what is considered female and male. During PantheaCon in 2011, a group of Dianic Wiccans performing an all-female ritual turned away trans-women from joining due to their concept of women as capable of experiencing menstruation and childbirth.

Other pagans, however, have embraced a multitude of gender identities by worshiping transgender, intersex, and queer gods from antiquity, such as Greek god, Hermaphroditus.

== Religious support for gender equality ==
Some religions, religious scholars and religious persons have argued that "gender inequality" exists either generally or in certain instances, and have supported a variety of remedies.

Discrimination based on gender and religion is frequently the result of laws and practices that are justified by religious beliefs. Certain religions, for example, forbid women from acting as clergy. The priesthood is reserved for men in the Catholic Church. While men and women pray separately in Islam, women frequently have restricted room in mosques. Such traditions demonstrate the complicated interplay of prejudice at the intersection of gender and religion.

There are many women pastors face issues and encounter the "stained-glass ceiling" due to a strong lack of support within seminary education, and fewer opportunities that are available for them to gain experience within the clergy in order to become ordained.

Sikhs believe in equality of men and women. Gender equality in Sikhism is exemplified by the following quote from Sikh holy scriptures: "From woman, man is born; within woman, man is conceived; to a woman he is engaged and married. Woman becomes his friend; through woman, the future generations come. When his woman dies, he seeks another woman; to woman he is bound. So why call her bad from whom kings are born. From woman, woman is born; without woman, there would be no one at all." – Translated into English from Gurmukhi, Siri Guru Nanak Sahib in Raag Aasaa, Siri Guru Granth Sahib pp 473

Pierre Chaunu has argued that the influence of Christianity promotes equality for women.

Priyamvada Gopal, of Churchill College, Cambridge, argues that increased gender equality is indeed a product of Judeo-Christian doctrine, but not exclusive to it. She expresses concern that gender equality is used by western countries as a rationale for "neocolonialism". Jamaine Abidogun argues that Judeo-Christian influence has indeed shaped gender roles in Nigeria (a strongly Christianised country); however, she does not consider feminism to be a product of Judeo-Christian doctrine, but rather a preferable form of "neocolonialism".

== Gender patterns in religious observance ==
In studies pertaining to gender patterns in religions, it has been widely accepted that females are more likely to be religious than males. In 1997, statistics gathered by Beit-Hallahmi and Argyle theorized this phenomenon into three primary causes. The first explanation is that women feel emotions at greater heights than men do, thus women tend to turn to religion more in times of high emotions such as gratitude or guilt. The second explanation is that female socialization is more likely to align with values that are commonly found in religion such as conflict mediation, tenderness, and humility. In contrast, male socialization is more likely to emphasize rebellion, thus making the guideline aspects of religion less appealing. The third explanation, which is also the most recent theory, is that females are more likely to be able to identify with religion as a natural consequence of societal structures. For example, since a majority of religions emphasize women as caretakers of the home, the societal expectation of women to take greater responsibility than men for the upbringing of a child makes religion an appealing commitment. Another example is that traditionally, men tend to work outside the home whereas women tend to work inside the home, which corresponds to studies that have shown that people are more likely to be religious when working inside of their homes.

The Pew Research Center studied the effects of gender on religiosity throughout the world, finding that women are generally more religious than men, yet the gender gap is greater for Christians than Muslims.

== Specific religions ==
More information on the role of gender in specific religions can be found on the following pages:

- Baháʼí Faith – Baháʼí Faith and gender equality
- Buddhism – Women in Buddhism
- Christianity – Women in Christianity
  - Mormonism – Women and Mormonism
- Hinduism – Women in Hinduism
- Islam – Women in Islam
- Judaism – Gender and Judaism, Women in Judaism
- Sikhism – Women in Sikhism

== See also ==
- Thealogy aka Feminine divine
- Religion and sexuality
- Sex segregation
- Transgender people and religion
- Anti-gender movement
