= B'not Esh =

US-based Jewish feminist collective

B'not Esh ("Daughters of Fire") is a Jewish feminist collective based in the United States that was founded in 1981, the group sought to define a reconstructed feminist view of the Jewish tradition and defines itself as a Jewish Feminist Spirituality Collective. The group's basic position is that the Jewish spirituality of women is a political struggle.

== History ==
According to Judith Plaskow, a founding member of the group, the need for the collective was first identified by American Jewish feminists in 1980, and the planning for the collective first began at the 1980 National Havurah Summer Institute, an event that offered a religious fellowship program for like-minded Jews. As a collective running since the 1980s, B'not Esh inspired many Jewish feminist projects, conferences, books, and other initiatives. The group's first meeting was held on March 30, 1981, and held in Cornwall-on-Hudson, New York. The meeting became the space for the group's essential activities, and the event has taken place annually since 1983, the same year the group adopted its name "B'not Esh".

According to Martha Ackelsberg, a founding member, during the early years of the group's existence, the question of Jewish liturgy was highly contested, with some members enthusiastically participating and enjoying an all women's prayer service for the Jewish Sabbath, while others objected to the use of traditional liturgical text that were male-dominated. The conflict led the group to incorporate new elements into the Jewish prayer service including poetry and meditation, as well as modifications to the traditional liturgical language by feminizing the name of God. By 1985, the group's consensus was that many forms of prayer and spirituality would have to be tried to overcome the limits of their traditional Jewish education and upbringing.
