= Martha Ackelsberg =

American political scientist

- Born: 1946 (age 79–80)
- Education: Radcliffe College; Princeton University
- Awards: Frank Johnson Goodnow Award, APSA
- Scientific career
- Fields: Political science
- Workplaces: Smith College

Martha A. Ackelsberg (born 1946) is an American political scientist, anarchist and women's studies scholar. Her work focuses on the nature of power and its relationship with communities. Cases used in her research include feminist activism in the United States and the Mujeres Libres, an anarcha-feminist women's organization during the Spanish Revolution of 1936.

== Early life and education ==
Ackelsberg was born in 1946. She attended Radcliffe College where she earned a BA in 1968, and Princeton University where she graduated with an MA in 1970 and a Ph.D. in 1976. She was a co-founder of the New York Women's Health Collective in 1970. The following year, while a graduate student, she campaigned for the university to report names to potential employers in a gender-neutral way. She also co-founded Ezrat Nashim in 1972, an organization dedicated to women's equality in Judaism.

== Career ==
Ackelsberg joined the faculty at Smith College in 1972. Ackelsberg was one of the first professors in the Women's studies program at Smith College, which she has been credited with helping to build. Throughout her first several decades as a professor, Ackelsberg was active in Jewish feminist activism with groups like B'not Esh. In 2006, she was appointed the Five College 40th Anniversary Professor at Smith College, and in 2007 she was named the William R. Kenan Jr. Professor. She retired in 2014.

Ackelsberg has written and edited several books. In 1991 she published Free Women of Spain: Anarchism and the Struggle for the Emancipation of Women, which has since been reissued. The book is a history of the Mujeres Libres (Free Women), a women's organization during the Spanish Revolution of 1936 that distinguished itself from other anti-fascist groups by seeking a broad emancipation of women in Spanish society. The Mujeres Libres (Free Women) aimed to empower women, by valuing equality, education, and health.

Ackelsberg also wrote the 2010 book Resisting Citizenship: Feminist Essays on Politics, Community, and Democracy. This collection of essays studies the connection between community and power, using the United States as a case study to investigate this connection in the context of democratic theory. The essays particularly focus on power as obtained and expressed by feminist activists among their larger communities.

Together with Kristen Renwick Monroe and Rogers Smith, Ackelsberg received the 2010 Frank Johnson Goodnow Award from the American Political Science Association, a lifetime award that "honors service to the community of teachers, researchers, and public servants who work in the many fields of politics."

Ackelsberg's work has been covered in media outlets like Nexo Jornal and the Jewish Voice, and she has written for Gotham Gazette. Her partner is Judith Plaskow, professor emerita of religious studies at Manhattan College.

The Jewish Women's Archive has described Ackelsberg as a Jewish lesbian feminist anarchist activist.

== Selected works ==
- Women, Welfare, and Higher Education: Toward Comprehensive Policies, edited, with Randall Bartlett and Robert Buchele (1988)
- Free Women of Spain: Anarchism and the Struggle for the Emancipation of Women (1991)
- Resisting Citizenship: Feminist Essays on Politics, Community, and Democracy (2010)

== Selected awards ==
- Frank Johnson Goodnow Award, American Political Science Association (2010)

== See also ==
- Anarchism in Spain
