= Ruthie Berman and Connie Kurtz =

American LGBT rights activists

Ruthie Berman
- Born: Ruth Berman; March 30, 1934 (age 92); New York City, U.S.
- Known for: American LGBT rights activist Pioneering lesbian activism
- Spouse: Constance Kurtz
- Children: 3

Connie Kurtz
- Born: Constance Kurtz; July 19, 1936; New York City, U.S.
- Died: May 27, 2018 (aged 81); West Palm Beach, Florida, U.S.
- Known for: American LGBT rights activist Pioneering lesbian activism
- Spouse: Ruth Berman
- Children: 2

Ruthie Berman (born March 30, 1934) and Connie Kurtz (July 19, 1936 – May 27, 2018) were American LGBT rights activists. As a couple, they successfully sued the New York City Board of Education for domestic partner benefits, winning such benefits for all New York City employees in 1994.

== Early lives ==
Both women were born in Brooklyn, Berman on March 30, 1934 and Kurtz on July 19, 1936; they met in the late 1950s and became friends. Both were married to men and had children. Kurtz moved to Israel with her family in 1970, and when she returned to visit America in 1974, she and Ruthie fell in love. They divorced their husbands and became a couple.

== As a lesbian couple ==
In 1988, Berman was a health and physical education teacher at a Brooklyn high school. She and Kurtz sued the New York City Board of Education for domestic partner benefits in 1988, eventually winning in 1994. The couple went on the talk shows The Phil Donahue Show and Geraldo to talk about the case, and came out of the closet on Donahue in 1988.

Berman and Kurtz started branches of Parents, Friends and Family of Lesbians and Gays (PFLAG) in Florida and New York, and in 2000, they began serving as co-chairs of the New York State NOW Lesbian Rights Task Force. They also founded The Answer is Loving Counseling Center (they were both certified counselors) and worked there for over twenty years. They were married on July 26, 2011, in New York. Rabbi Sharon Kleinbaum officiated.

They retired to Palm Beach County, Florida, where they were continually active in Democratic, LGBT, feminist, and #BlackLivesMatter politics.

In 2017, Ruthie and Connie LGBT Elder Americans Act of 2017 was introduced. If passed, this bill will amend the Older Americans Act of 1965 to include the specific needs of lesbian, gay, bisexual, and transgender (LGBT) individuals among the "greatest social needs" served under that Act. An LGBT individual shall be considered a "minority" for purposes of services provided under the Act. The bill authorizes the Administration of Aging to designate within it a person with responsibility for addressing issues affecting LGBT older individuals. In addition, the administration shall conduct studies and collect data to determine the services needed by LGBT older individuals. The administration shall establish and operate the National Resource Center on Lesbian, Gay, Bisexual, and Transgender Aging to provide national, state, and local organizations with the information and technical assistance needed by those organizations to effectively serve LGBT older individuals. The Long-Term Care Ombudsman of each state shall, as a condition of receiving certain federal funding under the Act, collect and analyze data related to discrimination against LGBT older individuals in long-term care settings.

== Film and papers ==
In 2002, a documentary titled Ruthie and Connie: Every Room in the House was made about their lives; it was directed by Deborah Dickson. The film premiered at the Berlin Film Festival in February 2002, and won six best documentary awards within a year. The Ruth Berman and Connie Kurtz Papers are held in the Sophia Smith Collection at Smith College.

== Death ==
Kurtz died from liver cancer on May 27, 2018, at the age of 81.

== Legacy ==
Ruthie and Connie have been recognized with awards throughout their activist careers. The acknowledgements continue for Ruthie and Connie (posthumously).
