= Dianic Wicca =

Neopagan female-centered goddess tradition

- Symbol of the Goddess with the pentacle
- Type: Wicca
- Orientation: Feminist Wicca
- Theology: Goddess movement
- Governance: Woman-centered; led by priestesses or led by collective
- Region: United States
- Origin: 1970s United States
- Members: Around 1,000–2,000

Dianic Wicca, also known as Dianic Witchcraft, is a modern pagan goddess tradition focused on female experience and empowerment. Leadership is by women, who may be ordained as priestesses, or in less formal groups that function as collectives. While some adherents identify as Wiccan, it differs from most traditions of Wicca in that only goddesses are honored (whereas most Wiccan traditions honor both female and male deities).

While there is more than one tradition known as Dianic, the most widely known is the female-only variety, with the most prominent tradition thereof founded by Zsuzsanna Budapest in the United States in the 1970s. It is notable for its worship of a single, monotheistic Great Goddess (with all other goddesses—of all cultures worldwide—seen as "aspects" of this goddess) and a focus on egalitarian matriarchy. While the tradition is named after the Roman goddess Diana, Dianics worship goddesses from many cultures, within the Dianic Wiccan ritual framework. Diana (considered correlate to the Greek Artemis) "is seen as representing a central mythic theme of woman-identified cosmology. She is the protector of women and of the wild, untamed spirit of nature."

The Dianic Wiccan belief and ritual structure is an eclectic combination of elements from British Traditional Wicca, Italian folk-magic as recorded by Charles Leland in Aradia, New Age beliefs, and folk magic and healing practices from a variety of different cultures.

== Beliefs and practices ==
Dianic Wiccans of the Budapest lineage worship the Goddess, who they see as containing all goddesses, from all cultures; she is seen as the source of all living things and containing all that is within her.

While Diana does have a triple aspect, it is in Her aspect as Virgin Huntress that She guides Her daughters to wholeness. She is "virgin" in the ancient sense of "She Who Is Whole Unto Herself." The ancient meaning of "virgin" described a woman who was unmarried, autonomous, belonging solely to herself. The original meaning of this word was not attached to a sexual act with a man. Diana/Artemis did not associate herself or consort with men, which is why these Goddesses are often understood to be lesbian.

Dianic covens practice magic in the form of meditation and visualization in addition to spell work. They focus especially on healing themselves from the wounds of the patriarchy while affirming their own womanhood.

Rituals can include reenacting religious and spiritual lore from a female-centered standpoint, celebrating the female body, and mourning society's abuses of women. The practice of magic is rooted in the belief that energy or 'life force' can be directed to enact change. However, rituals are often improvised to suit individual or group needs and vary from coven to coven. Some Dianic Wiccans eschew manipulative spellwork and hexing because it goes against the Wiccan Rede. However, many other Dianic witches (notably Budapest) do not consider hexing or binding of those who attack women to be wrong, and actively encourage the binding of rapists.

=== Differences from mainstream Wicca ===
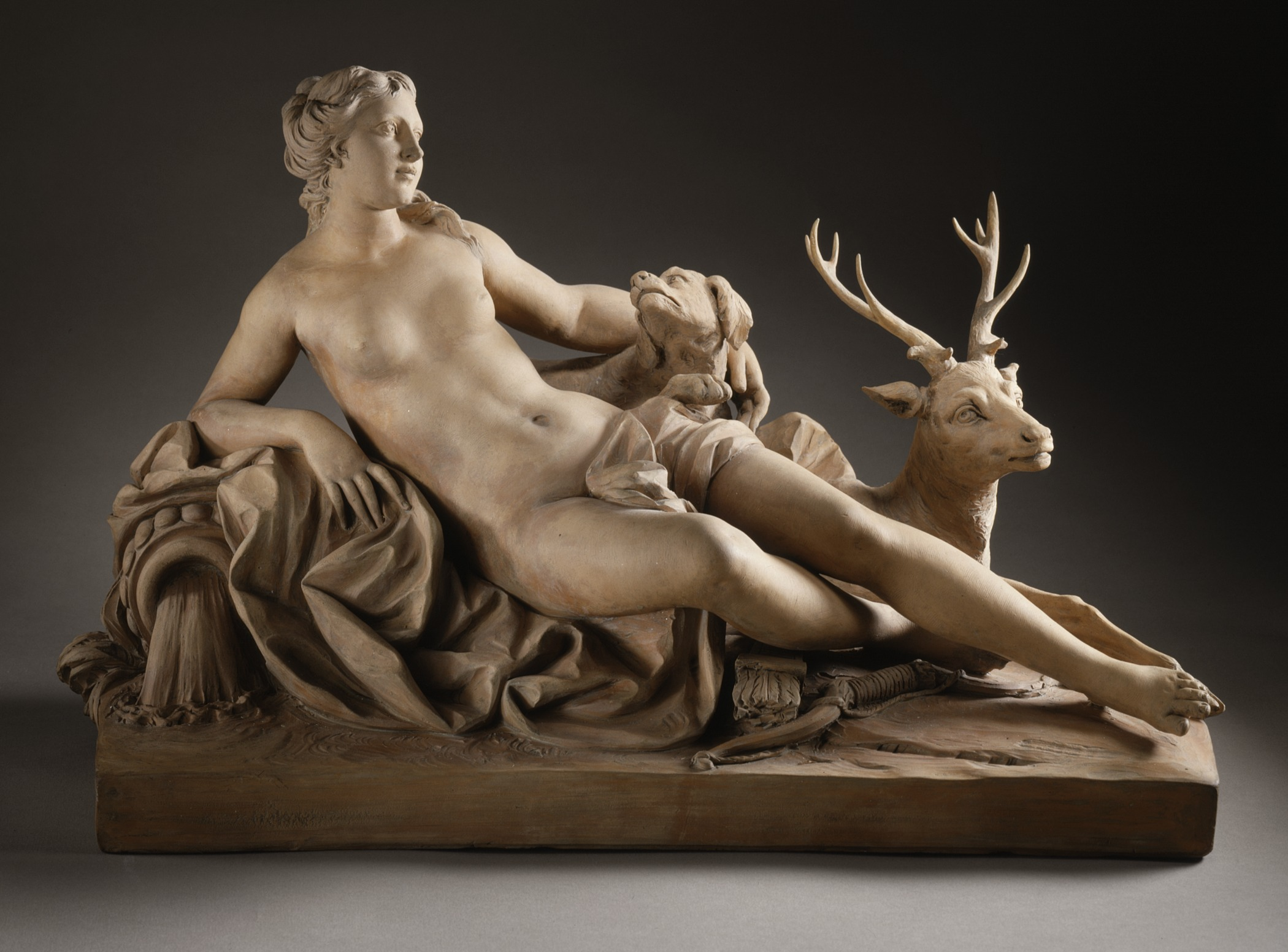
Diana (or Artemis, by her Greek name) as a protector of women and wild nature

Like other Wiccans, Dianics may form covens, attend festivals, celebrate the eight major Wiccan holidays, and gather on Esbats. They use many of the same altar tools, rituals, and vocabulary as other Wiccans. Dianics may also gather in less formal Circles. The most noticeable difference between the two are that Dianic covens of Budapest lineage are composed entirely of women. Central to feminist Dianic focus and practice are embodied Women's Mysteries—the celebrations and honoring of the female life cycle and its correspondences to the Earth's seasonal cycle, healing from internalized oppression, female sovereignty and agency. Another marked difference in cosmology from other Wiccan traditions is rejecting the concept of duality based in gender stereotypes.

When asked why "men and gods" are excluded from her rituals, Budapest stated:

It's the natural law, as women fare so fares the world, their children, and that's everybody. If you lift up the women you have lifted up humanity. Men have to learn to develop their own mysteries. Where is the order of Attis? Pan? Zagreus? Not only research it, but then popularize it as well as I have done. Where are the Dionysian rites? I think men are lazy in this aspect by not working this up for themselves. It's their own task, not ours.

— during a 2007 interview

Sociological studies have shown that there is therapeutic value inherent in Dianic ritual. Healing rituals to overcome personal trauma and raise awareness about violence against women have earned comparisons to the female-centered consciousness-raising groups of the 1960s and 1970s. Some Dianic groups develop rituals specifically to confront gendered personal trauma, such as battery, rape, incest, and partner abuse. In one ethnographic study of such a ritual, women shifted their understanding of power from the hands of their abusers to themselves. It was found that this ritual had improved self-perception in participants in the short-term, and that the results could be sustained with ongoing practice.

Dianic Wicca developed from the Women's Liberation Movement and some covens traditionally compare themselves with radical feminism. Dianics pride themselves on the inclusion of lesbian and bisexual members in their groups and leadership. It is a goal within many covens to explore female sexuality and sensuality outside of male control, and many rituals function to affirm lesbian sexuality, making it a popular tradition for lesbians and bisexuals. Some covens exclusively consist of same-sex oriented women and advocate lesbian separatism. Ruth Barrett writes,

For other lesbian Dianics, as well as heterosexual and bisexual Dianics, excluding males from participation in ritual is not born from a rejection of males but rather an embracing of women’s unique biological rites of passage and how living in female body in a patriarchal world informs and effects our lives. Many women choose Dianic separatist ritual simply because of the joy, fun, pleasure, feeling of safety, and value which they derive from being in a exclusively female space with other like-minded women.

== History ==
Aradia, or the Gospel of the Witches claims that ancient Diana, Aphrodite, Aradia, and Herodias cults linked to the Sacred Mysteries are the origin of the all-female coven and many witch myths as we know them.

Z Budapest's branch of Dianic Wicca began on the Winter Solstice of 1971, when Budapest led a ceremony in Hollywood, California. Self-identifying as a "hereditary witch," and claiming to have learned folk magic from her mother, Budapest is frequently considered the mother of modern Dianic Wiccan tradition. Dianic Wicca itself is named after the Roman goddess of the same name. Ruth Rhiannon Barrett was ordained by Z Budapest in 1980 and inherited Budapest's Los Angeles ministry. This community continues through Circle of Aradia, a grove of Temple of Diana, Inc.

== Denominations and related traditions ==
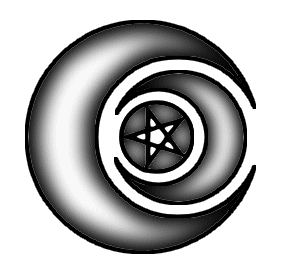
Modified Triple-goddess Wiccan symbol

- Traditions derived from Zsuzsanna Budapest – Female-only covens run by priestesses trained and initiated by Budapest.
- Independent Dianic witches – who may have been inspired by Budapest, her published work (such as The Holy Book of Women's Mysteries) or other woman's spirituality movements, and who emphasize independent study and self-initiation.

=== McFarland Dianic ===
McFarland Dianic is a Neopagan tradition of goddess worship founded by Morgan McFarland and Mark Roberts which, despite the shared name, has a different theology and structure than the women-only groups. In most cases, the McFarland Dianics accept male participants. McFarland largely bases their tradition on the work of Robert Graves and his book The White Goddess. While some McFarland covens will initiate men, the leadership is limited to female priestesses. Like the women-only Dianic traditions, "McFarland Dianic covens espouse feminism as an all-important concept." They consider the decision whether to include or exclude males as "solely the choice of [a member coven's] individual High Priestess."

== Criticism for transphobia ==
Dianic Wicca has been criticised by elements in the Neopagan community for being transphobic. In February 2011, Zsuzsanna Budapest conducted a ritual with the Circle of Cerridwen at PantheaCon for "genetic women only" from which she barred cis men and trans women. This caused a backlash that led many to criticize Dianic Wicca as an inherently transphobic lesbian-separatist movement. The Los Angeles Times wrote that:

Talia Bettcher, a professor of philosophy at Cal State L.A., said this trans exclusionary stance is common—though not universal—among women like Budapest who were grounded in lesbian separatism, a political vision that originated in the '70s. [...] The same defiance that made Budapest a feminist hero in the '70s has made her a divisive figure for many modern witches today.

== See also ==
- Feminist theology
- Goddess movement – Modern revival of divine feminine or female-centered spirituality
- Gynocentrism – Dominant or exclusive focus on women in theory or practice
- New religious movement – Religious community or spiritual group of modern origin
- Pachamama – Andean fertility goddess
- Shaktism – Goddess-centric sect of Hinduism
- Thealogy – Study and reflection upon the feminine divine from a feminist perspective
