= Judith Plaskow =

American theologian

Judith Plaskow (born March 14, 1947) is an American theologian, author, and activist known for being the first Jewish feminist theologian. After earning her doctorate at Yale University, she taught at Manhattan College for 32 years before becoming a professor emerita. She was one of the creators of the Journal for Feminist Studies in Religion and its editor for its first ten years. She also helped to create B'not Esh, a Jewish feminist group that heavily inspired her writing, and a feminist section of the American Academy of Religion, an organization of which she was president in 1998.

Plaskow's work has been critical in developing Jewish feminist theology. Her most significant work, Standing Again at Sinai: Judaism from a Feminist Perspective, argued that the absence of female perspectives in Jewish history has had a negative impact on the religion, and she urged Jewish feminists to reclaim their place in the Torah and in Jewish thought. It is one of the first Jewish feminist theological texts ever written, and some consider it one of the most important Jewish texts of the 20th century.

Her collection of essays titled The Coming of Lilith was critical in reimagining Lilith as a positive figure for women rather than a dangerous demon. Plaskow imagines Lilith as a woman wrongly punished for desiring her rightful equality with Adam. Once Eve seeks Lilith out, they join together in sisterhood to build a better world. Since The Coming of Lilith, Lilith has become an important figure to Jewish feminists and became the namesake of the Jewish feminist magazine Lilith.

From a young age, Plaskow viewed ethics and activism as integral to Judaism, which influenced her contributions to feminist ethics. She came out as a lesbian in the 1980s, and though sexuality was always a focus of hers, her article in Twice Blessed: On Being Lesbian or Gay and Jewish was her most formal and popular discussion of being a Jewish lesbian.

== Early life ==
Judith Plaskow was born in Brooklyn, New York, on March 14, 1947. Her parents were Vivian Cohen Plaskow, a remedial reading teacher, and Jerome Plaskow, a certified public accountant. Her younger sister, Harriet, was born in 1950. The Plaskows moved to West Hempstead, Long Island, and Plaskow attended public school there. She described her neighborhood as diverse in religions, but not in races. As soon as she was able to start going into New York City with her friends, she began to resent her town and was increasingly focused on the city.

Growing up, Plaskow was a part of a classical Reform congregation and completed twelve years of Hebrew school. Her early religious education was universalist, stressing that God calls the Jewish people to be the "light unto the nations," which edified her view that ethics and activism are crucial to Jewish practice. Plaskow thought her congregation was "typical in its treatment of women as second-class citizens." Her rabbi was opposed to allowing women to be ordained and disagreed with both bar and bat mitzvahs, wanting children to continue Hebrew school until "confirmation" in the ninth grade. The rabbi's parents convinced him to hold bar mitzvah ceremonies but insisted on the girls (including Plaskow) having a Hebrew recognition ceremony as a group. Plaskow reports that she always felt that there was something wrong with all the inconsistencies, but was too young to deconstruct what she saw.

As a child, Plaskow had a keen interest in theology and ethics, which was influenced by her Reform congregation and her natural curiosity. She attended the 1963 March on Washington for Jobs and Freedom with members of her congregation and heard Martin Luther King Jr.'s famous "I Have a Dream" speech, which inspired an imagined world transformed by gender equality, the way he had imagined one transformed by racial equality. After learning about the Holocaust in school, Plaskow raised her first theological questions about good and evil. Her interest only grew from this point, and she became the only student in her Hebrew school who actually wanted to be there. She always hoped to learn something valuable, though she says she never did.

Throughout junior high and high school, Plaskow hoped to become a rabbi, even though women rabbis were unheard of and opposed by many, including her own rabbi. However, she had her own reservations. She aimed to be a trailblazer but felt uncertain about her belief in God. A significant turning point occurred during a Ne’ila service on Yom Kippur when she realized the possibility of pursuing a doctorate in theology. Although she recognized that becoming a rabbi would have required less effort and would have made her the country's second female rabbi, she concluded that her path as a theologian aligned with her identity.

== Education ==
Plaskow obtained her B.A. magna cum laude from Clark University in 1968 which included spending her junior year abroad at the University of Edinburgh. Edinburgh was her first experience of being one of very few Jewish people in a mainly Christian setting and showed her how she easily put Christian questions in the Jewish context. It made her more comfortable applying to Protestant theology programs after she graduated, a necessity due to the dearth of Jewish programs and lack of a religion department at Clark University. From there, she was trained in Protestant theology and earned her Ph.D. from Yale Divinity School in 1975. Her dissertation was written at Concordia University while she was an adjunct and it was later published as Sex, Sin, and Grace: Women’s Experience and the Theologies of Reinhold Niebuhr and Paul Tillich. The subject was in line with her Protestant training, but she was mostly inspired by Valerie Saiving's 1960 article, "The Human Situation: a Feminist View" which echoed her concern that the lack of women in theology warped theological study. She sought out to build on Saiving's work by also analyzing Niebuhr and by attempting to reduce the article's gender essentialism, which is where she thought Saiving erred in her argument. She focused on interpreting how the Protestant doctrines of sin and grace related to women's experiences.

== Academic career ==
Plaskow's first professorship was at New York University. Unfortunately, the university's religious studies department shut down halfway through her first year there and she was sent looking for new work. She then found herself teaching at Wichita State University from 1976-79. She relished her time at Wichita because of the institution's robust religious and women's studies departments, but feared ending up stuck in Kansas and began to look elsewhere. She finally found a long term home at Manhattan College, where she ended up teaching for thirty two years and earned the title of professor emerita. The college's religious department was mostly Catholic, but this was no obstacle to Plaskow. She enjoyed learning more about Catholic theology and her position as an outsider allowed her to ask questions others may not have, including questioning her own religion.

After a long period of mainly focusing on Christian theology, Plaskow's sights gradually turned back to Judaism. She attended her first American Academy of Religion (AAR) conference in 1970 and was dismayed by the lack of women present. She didn't attend the conference in 1971, but Carol P. Christ, Elizabeth Schüssler Fiorenza, and other women created a women's caucus, a working group on women and religion, and elected the first woman president of the AAR, Christine Downing. The working group met for the first time in 1972, marking the beginning of women's studies in religion. Mary Daly relayed her first ideas for Beyond God the Father at this meeting and also gave her position as co-chair of the group to Plaskow. A few years later, the group became an official section of the AAR after successfully arguing that they were creating a new field of religious study and needed the space and authority to do so. The section became her home base for the academic study of religion and feminism.

At the first national Jewish feminist conference in February, 1973, Plaskow gave a lecture titled "The Jewish Feminist: Conflict of Identities" and was met with a standing ovation. She gave several lectures through the 1970s questioning if a woman could truly be a Jew, concluding that Judaism is passed down by women, but it's never truly received or owned by them. In 1979, she and her longtime collaborator and friend Carol P. Christ edited Womanspirit Rising: A Feminist Reader in Religion through the Yale Women's Alliance and it became a seminal anthology on feminist spirituality. It was one of the first of its kind and its success would later lead to the pair releasing another anthology, Weaving the Visions: New Patterns in Feminist Spirituality in 1989.

She got her first chance to teach a Jewish feminism and theology class at the first National Havurah Summer Institute in 1980. This opportunity was a personal breakthrough for Plaskow; she finally felt all of the aspects of her identity falling into alignment after feeling so much tension between them. After her first class, she was inspired to write "The Right Question is Theological," partly in response to Cynthia Ozick's article, "Notes Towards Finding the Right Question." Plaskow's article was published in 1982 and it laid down her feminist criticisms of key concepts in Judaism like the Torah, God, and Israel, using feminist midrash to argue that halakhah should be taken as secondary to theology. She considers it one of her quintessential works. Riding off the joy of studying together at the National Havurah Summer Institute, Plaskow and other like-minded women formed B'not Esh ("daughters of fire" in Hebrew) in 1981 as a Jewish feminist spirituality collective which has been meeting for 36 years. This group was indispensable to Plaskow in imagining and creating Jewish feminism; she believes she couldn't have written Standing Again at Sinai without B'not Esh. She created the Journal of Feminist Studies in Religion with Schüssler Fiorenza and they published their first edition in spring, 1985. Plaskow served as editor for ten years and the journal still exists today.

In her influential book Standing Again at Sinai, Plaskow wrote that the Torah, and Jews' conception of their own history, have been written by and in the language of a male patriarchy in a manner that sanctions the marginalization of women, and must be reclaimed by redefining its content to include material on women's experiences. She famously wrote "We must render visible the presence, experience, and deeds of women erased in traditional sources. We must tell the stories of women's encounters with God and capture the texture of their religious experience...To expand Torah, we must reconstruct Jewish history to include the history of women, and in doing so alter the shape of Jewish memory." Making this history visible is essential to developing feminist midrash in her eyes.

"The Coming of Lilith" (1972) continued the Jewish feminist tradition of examining female archetypes in the Bible like Queen Esther and Lilith. Lilith was Adam's original mate and was created as equal to him. Lilith fled Eden when she was denied sexual equality, was replaced by submissive Eve, and became a she-demon who fed on infant boys. Plaskow imagines Lilith as waiting for Eve to come find her outside the walls of Eden and after Eve arrives and they've bonded, they'll rebuild the world together, which Adam and God fear. Plaskow's work helped turn Lilith from the prototypical example of what a woman shouldn't be to an empowered figurehead for women's liberation.

Her most recent book, Goddess and God in the World: Conversations in Embodied Theology, was released in 2016. It's another collaboration with Christ in which they draw on their personal experiences to develop and argue in favor of the embodied theological method. Judith's view of God/Goddess as an "impersonal creative power" contrasts Christ's view of Goddess/God as a personal, loving force but instead of trying to reconcile their views, they argue that this difference shows that theology is deeply personal and embodied and we must consider how our experiences impact our theological discussions.

== Personal life ==
Plaskow married rabbinical scholar Robert Goldenberg in 1967. They worked together at New York University, Concordia University, and Wichita State University. Their son, Alexander Goldenberg, was born in 1977. When she came out as a lesbian in 1984, she separated from Goldenberg. She has a nine year old (as of 2021) granddaughter.

At the second meeting of B'not Esh in 1983, Plaskow realized she had fallen in love with Martha Ackelsberg, a member of B'not Esh and a government and women's studies professor at Smith College. After her separation from Goldenberg, she and Ackelsberg began a long distance relationship for thirty years before moving in together. They are still together today but have decided never to marry, rejecting the idea that rights should be tied to marriage in support of building intimate lives on one's own terms.

Her lesbianism was an open secret in her social circles after she came out, but she didn't explicitly connect herself to lesbianism in academia immediately. Standing Again at Sinai's discussion of sexuality doesn't probe the author's lesbianism but she does use "our" when talking about homosexual identities. It was only when she published "Twice Blessed: On Being Lesbian or Gay and Jewish" that she labeled herself and it was read as a "lesbian treatise," even though much of the writing was taken from Standing Again at Sinai. The years following Standing at Sinai saw her write several essays on sexuality, four of which appear in The Coming of Lilith: Essays on Feminism, Judaism, and Sexual Ethics, 1972–2003, which was published in 2005. She says coming out increased her creativity and underlies her scholarship and views, even if her work isn't explicitly about her lesbianism.

Plaskow credits her friends and colleagues with shaping and progressing her ideas about Jewish feminist theology. She met Carol P. Christ in 1969 when she was the only other woman in the theology program at Yale. Christ became a friend, editor, collaborator, and sounding board for Plaskow, a relationship they still have today. Christ guided Plaskow's dissertation and Plaskow says she couldn't have completed her degree without Christ's help. They've since worked together on many projects. Elizabeth Schüssler Fiorenza was also very influential to Plaskow. They founded the Journal of Feminist Studies in Religion (JFSR) together and she credits Schüssler Fiorenza's 1983 book, In Memory of Her with expanding her perception of Jewish women's history. The women of B'not Esh, including Ackelsberg, Marcia Falk, Drorah Setel, and Sue Levi Elwell also had a life-changing impact on Plaskow's development of a specifically Jewish feminist theology.

== Legacy as a feminist theologian ==
Plaskow is considered to be one of the most significant and well-known feminist theologians of the twentieth century for her foundational contributions to her field. As a trailblazer, her path was not without obstacles. In Womanspirit Rising: A Feminist Reader in Religion, she recalls how her professors discouraged her and Christ from pursuing feminist theology. One professor dismissed Christ's feminist theology essay in favour of discussing her male classmates' essays because he didn't think Christ's topic was important. Their proposal to study historical attitudes towards women in Christianity for their theses was angrily rejected by a professor. This was no surprise to Plaskow because when she entered academia, theology was a heavily male dominated field and little attention had been paid to women in theology.

Her contributions to Jewish feminist theology in particular have proved to be invaluable. She was the first Jewish feminist to call herself a theologian and Standing Again at Sinai: Judaism from a Feminist Perspective (1990) was the first Jewish feminist text dedicated to theology. Her work came at a moment in time where the Jewish Renewal Movement and women gaining secular leadership roles had paved the way for women to become rabbis, prayer leaders, and overall, more visible in their religious communities. Midrash, the act and the product of re-interpreting religious texts to understand changes in society in continuity with Jewish tradition, became very concerned with the feminist movement and how it related to Judaism. Standing Again at Sinai offered a way to conceptualize women in Jewish history while dealing with the patriarchal power and language of Judaism, inspiring an outpouring of Jewish feminist work as Plaskow encouraged the development of feminist midrash. Additionally, her collaboration with Christ in Womanspirit Rising was significant for placing Jewish feminist writing alongside feminist writing from other religions, increasing the visibility of Jewish feminism.

Plaskow acknowledges Standing Again at Sinai as her most influential work, but states that her greatest contribution to Jewish feminist theology is her methodology. She has continuously insisted that it isn't enough to put women in traditionally male roles, rather we must re-imagine and rebuild the system from the ground up. Additionally, her assertion that women's perspectives have been ignored in Jewish history and that Jewish feminists are called to reclaim the female perspective has inspired a wealth of scholarship.

She has long emphasized the value of sisterhood and understanding things through other women, informed by her experiences with Christ, the AAR, Yale Women's Alliance, and B'not Esh. She says her work is founded upon and she derives her authority from her experience of developing a sense of self through community with other women. Plaskow has often spoke about the value of "the yeah, yeah experience," in which women talking about their lives to each other discover how much they have in common. This is similar to the consciousness raising efforts promoted by feminists and Civil Rights activists since the late 1960s. Her understanding of sisterhood is reflected in her interpretation of Lilith, which emphasizes the value of a sisterhood between her and Eve. Despite her feeling that there is a natural and fruitful understanding between all women, she acknowledges that there is no universal experience of womanhood. She realizes the importance of racial and class differences, especially with regard to sexuality and religion.

Due to her belief that social justice and ethics are essential to Judaism and feminism, Plaskow has advocated for many causes in her career. She attended a Black Lives Matter march in 2014 in protest of the decision not to indict Daniel Pantaleo for the death of Eric Garner. She encourages Jewish feminists to engage with other social issues like Black Lives Matter and global warming.

== Criticism ==
Thalia Gur Klein criticized Plaskow's The Coming of Lilith for replicating interpretations of the Hebrew Bible, which Klein noted aligned with anti-Judaism. Klein disagreed with Plaskow that males are dominant in the Bible; instead, they are as dominant as women, citing examples in which women exercised their dominance. In Plaskow's reading of Leviticus 18, she argues that rules about sexuality were created to protect men's social status, not to protect women and children, which is why scripture allows for a man to sexually abuse his daughter or granddaughter. Klein says this is a misinterpretation and is not permitted, insisting that the laws were made to protect women and children. Klein criticized Plaskow's relation of Israeli violence to the story of Esther because it perpetuated the idea that Jewish people have a "tradition of genocide" enacted against the Persians and now against Palestinians. Klein argues that the Israeli link is unnecessary and partially inaccurate, in both cases arguing that Jews were resisting aggression, not carrying out genocides. She says it is important that Plaskow and other feminists be careful not to fall back on anti-Jewish readings of Hebrew texts in trying to analyze their patriarchal nature.

== Publications ==
- J. Plaskow, Sex, Sin, and Grace. University Press of America, 1979. ISBN 0-8191-0882-0
- J. Plaskow, Weaving the Visions : New Patterns in Feminist Spirituality. HarperSanFrancosco, 1980. ISBN 0-06-061383-1
- J. Plaskow, Standing Again at Sinai: Judaism from a Feminist Perspective, HarperSanFrancisco, 1991. ISBN 0-06-066684-6
- J. Plaskow, The Coming of Lilith : Essays on Feminism, Judaism, and Sexual Ethics, 1972-2003. Beacon Press, 2005 ISBN 0-8070-3623-4
- J. Plaskow; C.P. Christ, Goddess and God in the World: Conversations in Embodied Theology. Fortress Press, 2016. ISBN 150640118X
