= Temma Kaplan =

American historian

Temma Kaplan is an American writer and distinguished professor emeritus of history at Rutgers University. She wrote Crazy for Democracy, Anarchists of Andalusia 1868-1903, Red City, Blue Period and Democracy: A World History. She won a Guggenheim Fellowship in 1996.
