= Margaret Wenig =

American rabbi (born 1957)

Margaret Moers Wenig (born 1957) is an American rabbi and writer.

== Career ==
In 1976, Wenig co-wrote with Naomi Janowitz Siddur Nashim, the first Jewish prayer book to refer to God using female pronouns and imagery.

Wenig graduated from Brown University in 1978 and was ordained in 1984. Wenig served as a rabbi at Beth Am, The People's Temple, located in New York City, from 1984 to 2000.

In 1990, Wenig wrote the widely published sermon "God is a Woman and She is Growing Older."

In 2015, Wenig became the first Jewish president of the Academy of Homiletics.

Wenig is a senior lecturer in liturgy and homiletics at the Hebrew Union College-Jewish Institute of Religion.

== Personal life ==
Wenig married Sharon Kleinbaum in 2008; they later divorced.
