= Carol P. Christ =

American scholar (1945–2021)

Carol Patrice Christ
- Born: December 20, 1945
- Died: July 14, 2021 (aged 75)
- Education: Ph.D., Yale University
- Notable work: Weaving the Visions: New Patterns in Feminist Spirituality (1989); Womanspirit Rising (1979/1989)
- Theological work
- Tradition or movement: thealogy, goddess movement

Carol Patrice Christ (December 20, 1945 – July 14, 2021) was a feminist historian, thealogian, author, and foremother of the Goddess movement. She obtained her PhD from Yale University and served as a professor at universities such as Columbia University and Harvard Divinity School. Her best-known publication is "Why Women Need The Goddess". It was initially a keynote presentation at the "Great Goddess Re-emerging" conference" at the University of Santa Cruz in 1978. This essay helped to launch the Goddess movement in the U.S. and other countries. It discusses the importance of religious symbols in general, and the effects of male symbolism of God on women in particular. Christ called herself a "thealogian" and as such, made important contributions to the discipline of theology, significantly helping to create a space for it to be far more inclusive of women than has historically been the case. The term "thealogy" is derived from Ancient Greek θεά (theá, "goddess") + -logy.

Christ wrote five influential books on women's spirituality and feminist theology and was a co-editor of two classic anthologies: "Weaving the Visions: New Patterns in Feminist Spirituality" (1989); and "Womanspirit Rising" (1979/1989). The latter included her essay Why Women Need the Goddess. Both anthologies included feminist religious writing from writers from a very diverse range of religious backgrounds. She held a PhD from Yale University. Carol P. Christ taught at major universities in the United States, including Columbia University, Harvard Divinity School, Pomona College, San Jose State, and the California Institute of Integral Studies. As director of the Ariadne Institute, she conducted pilgrimages to sacred sites in Greece containing artifacts of matriarchal religion. For many years she had been a resident of the Greek island of Lesbos, the home of the poet Sappho.

== Feminist theology ==
The first conference of Women Theologians took place in 1971 at Alverno College in the U.S. state of Wisconsin. According to Christ, the meaning of thealogy to her is the idea of religious symbols having influence on human beings but also the understanding of ethical decision making. It is having the consciousness rising process where women fit together. She has taken her approach imagining the Goddess in a patriarchal tradition. She defined her own religious views as "immanental inclusive monotheism and panentheism". She distinguished herself from her collaborator Judith Plaskow in that she did not view the Goddess as all-powerful.

== "Why Women Need the Goddess" ==
Since her essay has been influential to many women in terms of opening the possibilities to understanding how religion has a great impact on our lives. Christ also talks about how Religion that is focused solely on the male dominance representation of God impacts how the political and psychological aspects of human being work. Religion that created a male representation of God aids the societal power of a man as well as in the political side as they are automatically given the privilege. Christ specifically mentioned in her essay that "religion centered on the worship of a male God create "moods" and "motivations" that keep women in the state of psychological dependence on men and male authority," which gives a solidified explanation as to how influential a Male given God's representation affects the moods as well as motivation of why women and their privileges are the way they are. There are many restrictions a woman has to follow and go through in Christianity, Judaism, and other religions because of the way these religions have structured the hierarchy (with men in control of everything and women being under them). Because of how religion is controlled by men, feminists did not want to leave it as it is and make amendments so that women are valued as well.

The essay also talks about other important figures in history to support the idea of needing a female representation of Goddesses like Philosopher Simone de Beauvoir, as she said "Man enjoys the great advantage of having a god endorse the code he write; and since man exercises a sovereign authority over women it is especially fortunate that this authority has been vested in him by the supreme being."

Carol discussed four aspects of Goddess symbolism that are important to discuss in order to understand her step towards needing a Goddess in Women's lives to minimise the male representation of God. She talked about

- the Goddess as affirmation of female power
- the female body
- the female will
- women's bond and heritage

According to Christ, the simplest and basic idea behind woman Goddess "is the acknowledgement of the legitimacy of female power as a beneficent and independent power" meaning that female power should be invested in a way that they are superior to themselves and have independent power to themselves as well and sustaining the power by themselves so that she will no longer be dependent on men or male figures as saviors to situations. Feminist Priestess Starhawk also says that the symbol of goddess to her means it depends on how a woman feels and more so "When I feel weak, she is someone who can help and protect me. When I feel strong, she is the symbol of my own power". Another aspect related to the female body is that Christ portrays women as a unique creature. Women are menstruants, birthgivers and women's connection to their bodies is related to the nature and the world around us. Menstruating women have been viewed differently for a long period of time and the taboo with this issue is also quite generalized. It was often seen as an issue with a woman's bodily functions and many women were also forbidden to enter holy sacred places of different religions due to seeing menstruation as a negative means of a woman's body. Christ has also spoken of how a Goddess is also a representation to a birthgiver which is where women are privileged and it's a life-giving power that women carry. Since Goddess is seen as a creator of the universe and of life, Carol's idea of women as birth-giver automatically aids the idea of women's capacity of creating a new life and bringing into life as an act of Goddess. Then, the female will is also important to acknowledge and value, even being in patriarchal society. A woman needs to understand that her opinions are valid and that she does not need to devalue herself while trying to please others due to being in a patriarchal society as well. Lastly, the importance of women's bond and heritage because that is also often controlled by the men as the dominant source. Christ says that "The celebration of women's bonds to each other, as mother and daughters, as colleagues and co-worker, as sisters, friends, and lovers, is beginning to occur in the new literature and culture created by women in the women's movement" meaning that women empowering each other and making a move for better living standards is only possible when one woman starts supporting another. A mother-daughter bond is known to be a special bond because the mother being the creator of her child, already symbolized herself as a Goddess of birth-giving. Simone de Beauvoir has also mentioned that "The mother daughter relation is distorted in patriarchy because the mother must give her daughter over to men in a male-defined culture which women are viewed as inferior".

== Significance ==
According to scholarly source, Carol believed that "it is necessary to take the risk of writing personally because in that way we remain true to what we know at the deepest levels of our being and to the insights with which we create feminist theology". Christ's ideology is not neglecting or questioning religion, it is solely based on the authoritarian justice and worship of male figures which is demeaning to women. Christ has written another follow up of "Why Women Need a Goddess" to "Why Women, Men, and Other Living Things Still Need the Goddess". It argues that even still today, everyone needs a Goddess figure to control the power of hierarchy and patriarchy. Christ has written six books in her areas of Feminism study and the following are mentioned.

- She Who Changes (Palgrave Macmillan, 2003)
- Rebirth of the Goddess (Routledge, 1998)
- Odyssey with the Goddess (Continuum, 1995)
- Weaving the Visions (coeditor with Judith Plaskow, 1989)
- Laughter of Aphrodite (Harper, 1987)
- Diving Deep and Surfacing (Beacon, 1980/1986/1995)
- Womanspirit Rising (coeditor with Judith Plaskow) (Harper & Row, 1979, 1989)

== Essays ==
- Christ, Carol P. (Spring 1978). "Why Women Need the Goddess" (PDF). Heresies: A Feminist Publication on Art and Politics. 2 (1). Heresies Collective: 8–13.
- —— (2008). "Ecofeminism: Women, Nature, Dualism and Process-Relational Philosophy.". In Weber, Michel; Desmond, Will (eds.). Handbook of Whiteheadian Process Thought. Vol. 1. Heusenstamm, Germany: Ontos Verlag. pp. 87–98. ISBN 9783938793923.
- —— (2004). "Carol P. Christ". In Braude, Ann (ed.). Transforming the Faiths of Our Fathers: Women Who Changed American Religion. St. Martin's Press. pp. 97–113. ISBN 978-1403964601.

== Death ==
Christ's death from cancer was announced by the Association for Study of Women and Mythology on July 14, 2021. An obituary honouring her contributions to Feminist Thealogy may be found on "The Girl God" blog. She was remembered by the American Academy of Religion for her service to the organization, and her elevation of the Goddess movement.

== See also ==
- Dianic Wicca
- Feminist theology
- Marija Gimbutas
