= Women in the Confederación Nacional del Trabajo =

Women in the Confederación Nacional del Trabajo faced many specific challenges owing to a long history of sex-based discrimination in the Spanish anarcho-syndicalist movement and in the Confederación Nacional del Trabajo (CNT). From early in its history, there was a belief that a woman's primary role was to reproduce and that only men should be in the workforce. Few women were involved in the early efforts inside Spain, and internationally there were active attempts to keep women out. The formal creation of the CNT in 1910 did little to change this. Anarchist men inside the CNT actively tried to keep women out to avoid diminishing their own importance.

The creation of the Second Republic did little to change this dynamic. Women were largely locked out of the CNT and events in this period, even when the groups claimed to be in favor of gender equity and their articles of federation claimed to support women's rights. Mujeres Libres was created in this period, and served as the largest and most important women's organization of its kind. Founded by women who were locked out of the CNT, it was doubly discriminated against due to its affiliation with the CNT and deliberate efforts by the CNT to deny the group recognition as an affiliate. The CNT ignored working-class women, and made the hunger situation worse in cities like Barcelona where the leadership blamed women for bread and food riots.

The conclusion of the Civil War was another repressive period for anarchist women and women affiliated in any way with the CNT. Many wives, daughters and mothers of CNT militia people, former milicianas and CNT members were executed by Francoist forces, while others found themselves being given life sentences in prisons. Women continued to support the CNT clandestinely, although in the absence of CNT records, their history remains incomplete.

== Prelude to the Second Republic (1800–1922) ==
=== Early Spanish anarcho-syndicalism ===
The early Spanish anarcho-syndicalist movement drew part of its philosophy regarding women from the first congress of the International Workingmen's Association (Spanish: Asociación Internacional de Trabajadores) (AIT) in 1866. The congress created a resolution that said, "Without the family, the human species is only a conglomerate of beings, without certain functions, without reason, without law and without purposes. Without the family, men are a huge confused, immense community, where the only enemy is man. Without the family, women do not have on the earth, have no reason for being, since without the family woman is only a wandering being, condemned by her physical constitution to premature exhaustion, to incessant and impotent efforts, which transform her organism in a radical way and amount to the negation of the species and the disappearance of the species." The international Congress then went on to defend distinct sex roles based on biology where femaleness is defined by procreation. The belief carried on in the movement that women should remain out of the workforce as an appendage to man because of man's need to produce, whole women reproduced.

Views in Spain changed little in the next ten years. While the 1872 Congreso de la Regional de España in Zaragoza published a declaration espousing equal rights between the sexes, this period otherwise saw little material, especially material aimed at a male audience, to support these utopian positions. More broadly, this mid-19th century in Spain saw no women represented among Spain's unions and trade associations.

A few women were involved in the movement, but little is known about them. The two most well known ranking women before the 1900 and the birth of the CNT in 1910 were Manuela Díaz and Vicenta Dura. They served as secretaries in 1883 in Federación Regional Española de la Internacional. Beyond this fact, little is known about them, other than their opposition to the Franco-Prussian War, which they signed a petition by Ateneo Catalán in Barcelona in 1869, and that they participated in the Federación Regional Española de la Internacional Congress in 1872 in Zaragoza.

=== Formation of the Confederación Nacional del Trabajo ===
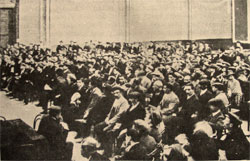
The 1910 CNT Congress.

The Confederación Nacional del Trabajo was formed in 1910 as an anarcho-syndicalism organization. The framework of gender being part of the labor and anarchist union movement entered Confederación Nacional del Trabajo's platform between 1910 and 1913. At this time, when women internationally wanted to be involved in their own national organizations, they were locked out. This included leading feminists of the day like Clara Zetken, Rosa Luxemburg and Alexandra Kollantai who espoused the belief that the personal is political. They were forced into women's only organizations that had little power in the broader movement. The only opportunities for them to full integrate was through youth organizations or the formation of women only trade unions.

The 1918 Congress of CNT demonstrated the gender based tensions among anarchists in Spain. Men tried to use the Congress to assert their own power over women in both the public and private sphere. This was in large part because male anarchists did not want to see a power dynamic change which would result in a diminishment of their own status.

Much of the early history of this period is only known because of Teresa Claramunt, Soledad Gustavo, Maria Caro, Angela Graupera, key women in CNT in terms of creating a history of women's voices and documenting their activities in the pre-Republic and Republic periods. It was during this period from 1910 to 1920 that anarchist women eschewed CNT. A consequence of their rejection of CNT was the creation women's only organizations in Spain including Acción Femenina in 1921. Another consequence of male rejection of female involvement was that some women sympathetic to their cause were rejected from participating, even on the margins. Maria Dolores Rodríguez sympathized greatly with the movement, but her embrace of Catholicism and its organizational structure resulted in her being excluded from it.

Women both inside and outside CNT continued to make and refine arguments about the role of women and sex in anarchist philosophy, with most of the women who would later create Mujeres Libres writing about these issues during the end of the 19th century and early 20th century. Their arguments would be further refined as a result of World War I, where they saw the impact of the need for women across Europe to work outside their homes.

== Dictatorship of Primo de Rivera (1923–1930) ==
During this period, CNT members in many places were required to meet clandestinely. Women continued to refine their positions during the Dictatorship of Primo de Reivera. In the 1920s, anarchist viewed women having fewer children, increased sex education and the elimination of prostitution as position that would provide resistance to institutions and ideologies they opposed, including capitalism, religion and the military. These changes would also emancipate women, by defining them around a task other than reproduction.

== Second Spanish Republic (1931–1937) ==
CNT was one of the two major anarchist organizations active during the Second Republic. By July 1936, their membership ranks were over 850,000, and were organized by region and sector of employment. CNT ignored specific needs of women, including maternity leave, childcare provisions and equal pay; they instead focused on general needs or needs of men in the workforces they represented. The CNT also perpetuated gender inequality, by paying its female employees less than men in comparable positions. CNT helped bring a right wing government to power after the 1933 elections by refusing to support the Popular Front alliance, and largely chose to abstain from the elections. They changed their positions for the 1936 elections, which assisted in bring the left back into power in the Second Republic.

The Second Republic did not result in immediate improvements for women inside the anarcho-syndicalist movement supported by CNT. Women were largely locked out of organized political groups and events in this period, even when said groups claimed to be for gender equity. Major trade unions at the time like UGT and CNT ignored specific needs of women, including maternity leave, childcare provisions and equal pay; they instead focused on general needs or needs of men in the workforces they represented. The CNT also perpetuated gender inequality, by paying its female employees less than men in comparable positions. Only 4% of UGT's membership was female by 1932.

While CNT offered a utopian view of women, the period of the Second Republic saw the realization of a massive contradiction in ideology with practice. Ideology promised liberation for women, but in practice in the CNT it meant subjugation of women. One of the biggest challenges faced by leftist women was Marxism prioritized the issue of class struggle over gender issues. For anarchists, syndicalists, communist and socialist women, this often resulted in male leadership deprioritizing women's needs and locking women out of participation and governance as their needs did not directly relate to the class struggle. Some leftist men, both in political and labor organizations, also resented women entering the workforce, viewing their lower wages as contributing to employers lowering wages among male workers. On the whole, the anarchist movement's male leadership engaged in deliberate exclusion of women and discouragement from seeking leadership positions in these organizations. Women were effectively locked out of the two largest anarchist organizations, CNT and the Federación Anarquista Ibérica (FAI).

Continued exclusion from CNT lead women in Barcelona to form Agrupación Cultural Femenina in 1935. Its members included Pilar Grangel, Áurea Cuadrado, Nicolasa Gutiérrez, Maruja Boadas, Rita Prunes and Conchita Liaño. Two years later, with will still not feeling represented by CNT, Mujeres Libres would be created in April 1936, and eventually see membership of over 20,000 women. They would also start publishing a magazine of the same name. The last issue would be published in Barcelona in December 1938, right before the city fell to fascist forces. No issues of it exist. Lucía Sánchez Satornil had been writing for newspapers and working in Madrid as a secretary for the local CNT branch during the Second Republic. From this position, she became one of CNT's more prominent women, and often collaborated with other labor organization media outfits. In one article, she wrote, "The problems of the proletarian woman requires solutions specific to the margin of class conflict resolutions." She would soon team up with other women inside CNT including Mercedes Comaposada, Amparo Poch, Carmen Conde, Suceso Portales and Joaquina Colomer to address these issues. Meanwhile, Libertad Rodenas, Pura Pérez and Olimpia Gómez worked with CNT youth group Juventudes Libertarias to further their goals for women.

Women, both inside CNT's structure and in organizations like Mujeres Libres, continued to try to push CNT to change its position on women to little success. CNT Congress in Zaragoza in May 1936 saw the Fabric and Textile Union of Barcelona publish a position that said of women's sexual freedom, "Sexual problems must have a moral regulator ... Sexual freedom, even though there should be no penalty of any kind for investment cases (read homosexuality) must be regulated by a higher moral concept tending to consider the sexual act as a derivative of the reproductive function of the species." Despite this, Mujeres Libres, the leading women's anarcho-syndicalist organization, tried to no avail to get recognition from CNT from May to July 1936, while also trying to bring more women into the movement. The CNT did not listen, and the Civil War then forced upon leadership an accelerated, radical change in its position.

== Spanish Civil War (1936–1939) ==
At the start of the Civil War, there were two primary anarchist organizations: CNT and the Federación Anarquista Ibérica. Representing working-class people, they set out to prevent the Nationalists from seizing control while also serving as reforming influences inside Spain. Most of the militias that were created during the immediate outbreak of the Civil War came from civil society groups like trade unions and political parties. CNT, UGT and other unions stepped in to provide logistical support for many of these militias. The number of women mobilized was never high. Most joined in order to further support political ideologies they supported. Most came from militant libertarian organizations like CNT, FAI and FIJL. These militias often lacked the typical military structure in order to better represent their ideologies and better mobilize local populations. There are conflicting accounts by historians as to when the decision was made to remove women from the front on the Republican side. One side dates the decision to late fall of 1936 as the date when Prime Minister Francisco Largo Caballero gave the order. Others date the order to March 1937. What is most likely is that various political and military leaders made their own decisions based on their own beliefs that led to different groups of female combatants gradually being withdrawn from the front. When Juan Negrín became the head of the Republican armed forces in May 1937, women's time in combat ended as he continued efforts to regularize Republican forces into the Republican Army. While the war broke down gender norms, it did not create an equitable employment change or remove the domestic tasks as the primary role of women. Behind the scene, away from the front, women serving in personal family and Republican opposition support roles were still expected to cook for soldiers, launder their uniforms, look after children and tend to dwellings. Women supporting CNT militants found themselves at once liberated from these gender roles, but still expected to serve male fighters in traditional roles.

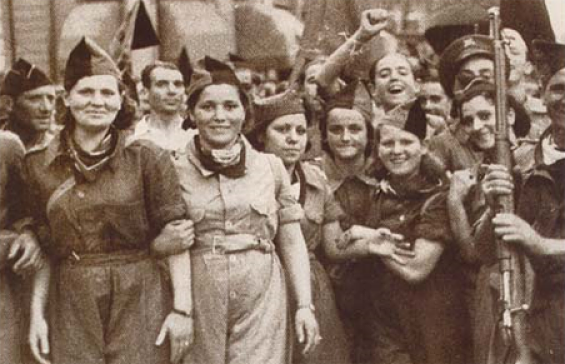
An Anarcha-feminist militia during the Spanish Social Revolution.

Federación Nacional de Mujeres Libres was founded in the early months of the war, and quickly gained support by many inside CNT. Despite representing a small slice of CNT membership, these women were able to quickly integrate many unions into rearguard militias. They also formalized their governance structure, including committees and subcommittees. Despite efforts of women in Mujeres Libres, CNT still refuses to recognize Mujeres Libres as a CNT affiliate. CNT leadership continues to maintain a position that women should not have their own separate branch inside the broader movement. This position contradicted their utopian ideals expressed in the organization's articles. This lack of recognition in 1938 was demoralizing, not just to women who supported CNT but inside the broader liberterian movement in Spain. Despite this, Mujeres Libres and other women militants in the CNT continued to go to fight for their ideals, including sex education, education for children, and the preparation of women for their role in society. They also continued to write, and to use the media to try to advance their cause. In February 1939, as a result of many of its members being in exiled internally and externally, being killed, or having disappeared during the Civil War, the organization dissolved.

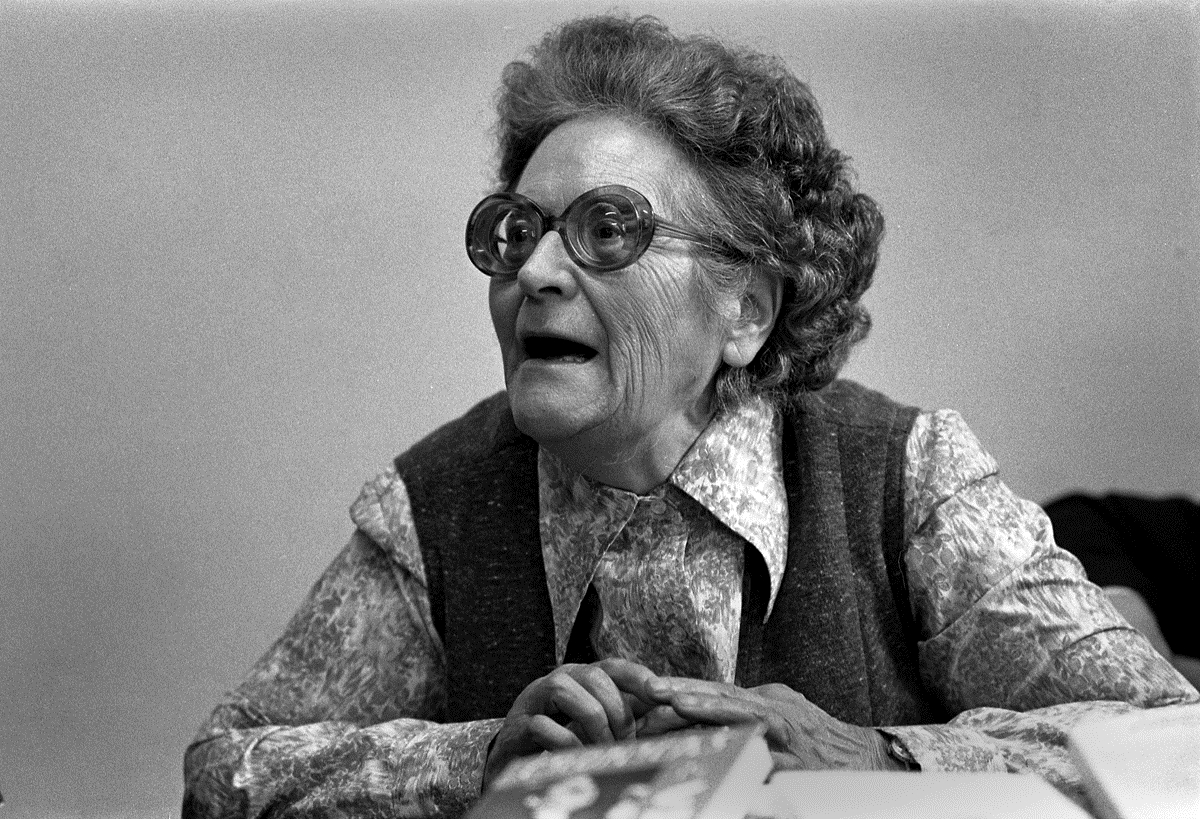
Federica Montseny in Barcelona on 1977, in her first visit from exile since 1939.

Women sometimes managed to gain leadership roles despite the many barriers present to them. Federica Montseny served as the Minister to Health, where she continued her support of anarchist organizations, only leaving this position in May 1937. She was the first woman in Spain to serve as a Minister. Her appointment represented an important inclusion of both anarchist factions into the government of the Second Republic. From her position as a CNT-FAI representative, Montseny enacted policies that allowed for the legalization of abortion in parts of Spain still controlled by Republican forces, sex education and the distribution of contraceptives.

=== Mujeres Libres ===
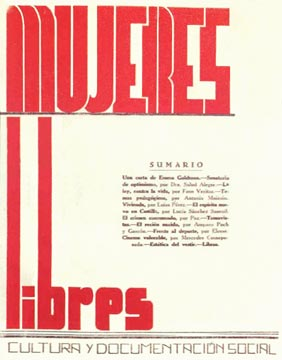
The first edition of Mujeres Libres, a magazine published by the organization of the same name.

Mujeres Libres became one of the most important women's anarchist organizations during the Civil War. Their Civil War ranks were aided by women moving over from CNT to participation in their organization. The organization's importance was a result of the activities they were carrying out. They included running educational programming, and trying to increase the literacy rate among women. They were also organizing collective kitchens, parent controlled daycare centers, and providing prenatal and infant health information to expecting parents. One of their biggest struggles during the Civil War was around fighting prostitution. Education was viewed a key aspect of this, as they believed educated women would be less likely to turn to prostitution. They had over 20,000 members by 1938. Mujeres Libres also published a journal of the same name. Writings found in it focused on personal autonomy, the creation of female identities, and self-esteem. It also often addressed the conflicts in identity between being a woman and being a mother, and how women should navigate their identities as maternal figures.

Mujeres Libres were one of the few organizations in this period that challenged mainstream Western feminist thinking. While deliberately rejecting the label of feminism, the group's version of feminism was about creating leadership structures that incorporated everyone, instead of having a feminist leadership model that paralleled patriarchal ones. Many feminists disliked the organization though, as it was an aligned with CNT, where women were often locked out of leadership positions and instead encouraged into their women's auxiliary organization.

During the Civil War, there were often tensions Mujeres Libres and other anarchist groups. The Economic Council of the Socialized Woodwork Industry and Solidaridad Internacional Antifascista both had women in high level leadership positions, and in leadership spots further down. In contrast, Mujeres Libres was a CNT auxiliary, and the women were often denied a specific spot at the table as there was a view among anarchist leaders that the adults, not women, should be the ones making decisions. Other anarchist organizations often were unwilling to give solidarity to women combating gender based problems at this time. There were always questions of if women should be fully integrated or should work in women's only groups to achieve specific aims. This resulted in making the movement less effective in accomplishing goals related to women.

The October 1938 CNT congress in Barcelona saw Mujeres Libres locked out, with the fifteen women strong delegation barred from entering. Women had previously been allowed to attend, but only as representatives of other, mixed gendered anarchist organizations. A women's only organization was not tolerated. The women protested this, and would not get an answer until an extraordinary meeting of CNT on 11 February 1939. When their answer came, it was that "an independent women's organization would undermine the overall strength of the libertarian movement and inject and element of disunity that would have negative consequences for the development of working-class interests and the libertarian movement on the whole."

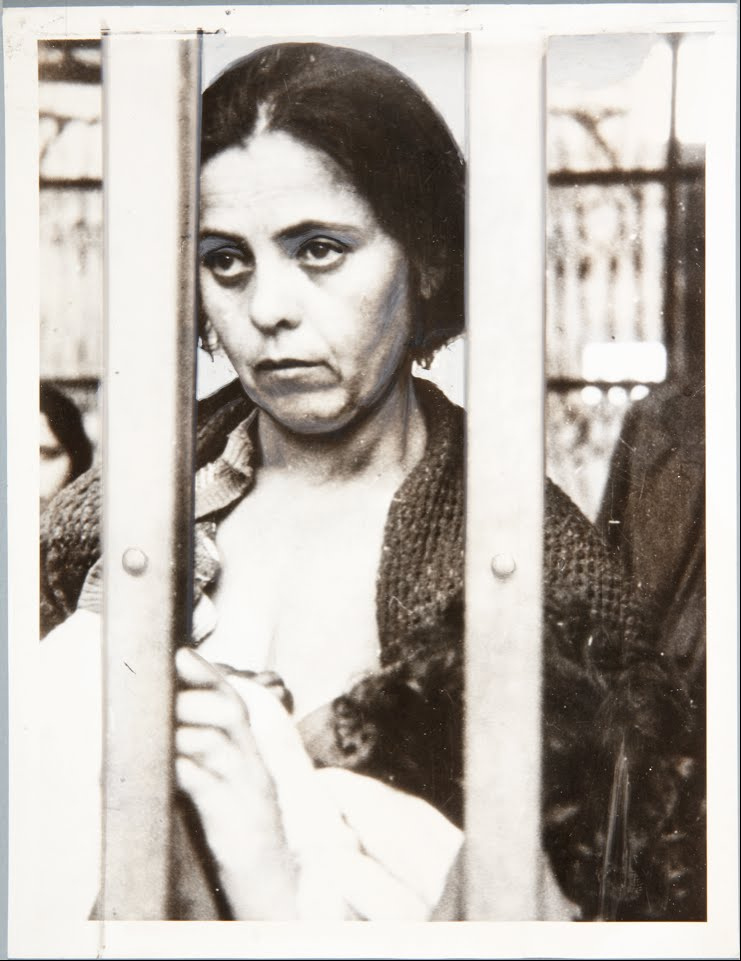
A woman in Barcelona waits during the Spanish Civil War.

Working-class women in Barcelona would often queue for hours for bread in 1937, only to find none was available. This sometimes would lead to rioting, which CNT leadership then worked hard to fault each other over in an attempt to avoid responsibility for the bread shortage. The problem was compounded by the fact that middle and upper-class people in Barcelona were readily buying bread on the black market. One riot occurred on 6 May 1937, when women looted vans full of oranges at the Barcelona port. When this aspect was brought to attention, CNT offered sexist excuses as to why working-class women were unable to buy bread. The result was that ordinary working-class women in the city often turned on anarchist women, and blaming them despite the anarchist women not being involved in CNT leadership. Mujeres Libres, CNT's women's arm, addressed this problem by taking action into their own hands, and staging assaults on markets to provide food for other women. Food riots would become a common feature in Barcelona during the Civil War.

The end of the Civil War in February 1939 led to the organization's dissolution as a result of many of its members being in exiled internally and externally, being killed, or having disappeared during the Civil War.

== Francoist Spain (1938–1973) ==
Following the end of the Civil War, there was a major crackdown on women affiliated in any way with the CNT. This included wives, daughters and mothers of CNT militia people. Many were executed in the final days of the Civil War. Others had death sentences commuted, and were locked up in prisons for years where many were also tortured.

Despite the risks, many women continued to be involved in the CNT in clandestine roles. These included Lola Iturbe, Sara Berenguer, Benigna Calve, Casilda Méndez, Maria Bruguera, Julia Mirabe, Gracia Ventura, Juaquina Dorado, Montserrat Elías, Pepita Subirats, Esperanza Moreno, Maria Tomas and Paquita Manso. Most of these were already well known having served as milicianas during the war. More women were involved, but because of the clandestine nature of the CNT in the early Francoist period, their names have not been recorded in existing CNT papers.
