= Lucía Sánchez Saornil =

Spanish poet, anarchist, feminist (1895–1970)

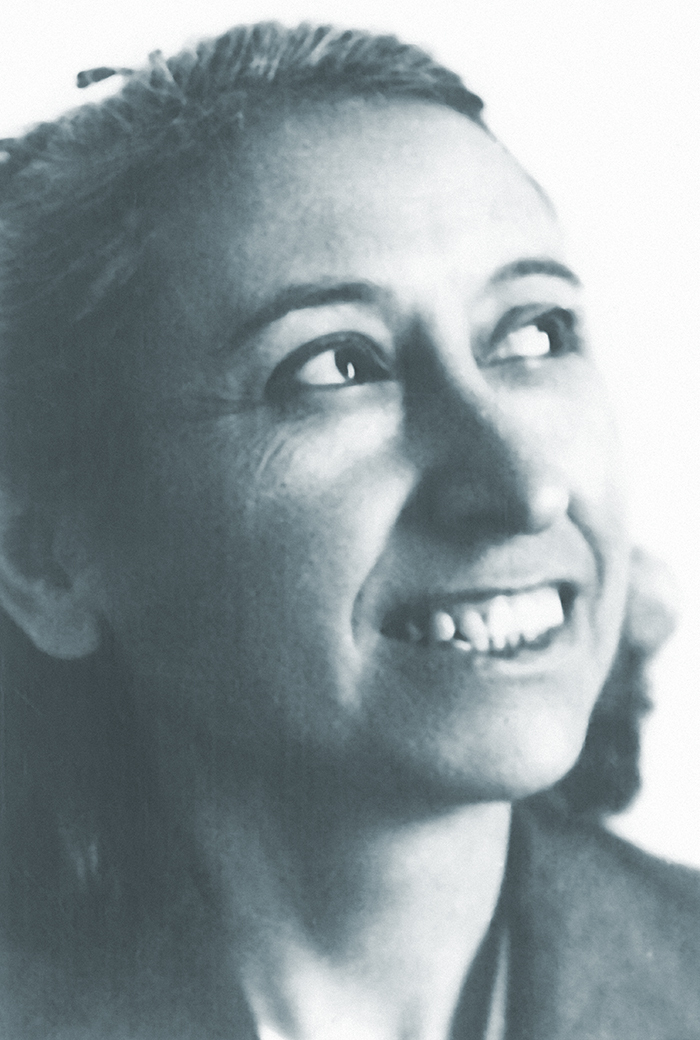
- Lucía Sánchez Saornil (1939)
- Born: 13 December 1895; Madrid, Spain
- Died: 2 June 1970 (aged 74); Valencia, Francoist Spain
- Occupations: Journalist, trade unionist, writer
- Partner: América Barroso
- Writing career
- Pen name: Luciano de San Saor
- Language: Spanish
- Period: 20th century
- Genre: Poetry
- Literary movement: Ultraism, anarcha-feminism

Lucía Sánchez Saornil (13 December 1895 – 2 June 1970), was a Spanish poet and anarcha-feminist activist, best known for co-founding the Mujeres Libres organisation together with Mercedes Comaposada and Amparo Poch y Gascón. Born into a working-class Madrilenian family, she taught herself from an early age and began writing poems for the burgeoning Futurist and Ultraist movements.

After the proclamation of the Second Spanish Republic in 1931, she joined the Confederación Nacional del Trabajo (CNT) and became involved in the Spanish anarchist movement. She quickly became discouraged by the sexist attitude of men within the movement, deciding it necessary to form specific women's libertarian groups in order to organise for women's empowerment. She developed a program for such an organisation and, together with Comaposada and Poch y Gascón, established the Mujeres Libres, a nationwide organisation of anarchist feminists.

During the Spanish Civil War, she continued her work with the Mujeres Libres and also served as secretary of Solidaridad Internacional Antifascista (SIA), making frequent trips to the frontline and campaigning for international support for the Republicans. After the fall of Catalonia, she briefly fled into exile, before clandestinely returning to Francoist Spain and living out the rest of her life in hiding in Valencia.

== Biography ==
Lucía Sánchez Saornil was born in Madrid, into a poor working-class family. She was self-taught and from a young age developed her talents as a poet, writing for journals of the Futurist movement. In 1916, she started work as a switchboard operator, at a time when women were beginning to become the sector's main work force.

=== Early activism ===
Following the proclamation of the Second Spanish Republic in 1931, Sánchez Saornil participated in a strike action against Telefónica, which first brought her into the Confederación Nacional del Trabajo (CNT). She quickly came to consider that women's rights, theoretically achieved by the new republic, were still largely inaccessible to women, and started to advocate for women's empowerment through education. As an activist within the libertarian women's movement of Barcelona, Sánchez Saornil floated the idea of establishing a women's education organization to a number of trade unions, but she was rebuffed by each of them and decided to return to Madrid.

There she met Mercedes Comaposada, a law student at the University of Madrid. In 1933, the pair attended a meeting of the CNT. They had been invited there to act as "women teachers", but instead found themselves being silenced by their male comrades, who still viewed women negatively. Frustrated by the experience, they left the meeting early and began to discuss alternatives at the Retiro Park. At the time, Sánchez Saornil was working for a railway union and procured a list of anarcho-syndicalist women's groups. They wrote to these groups, inviting them to discuss their experiences and issues they were having, and ended up receiving responses from throughout Spain. By 1935, the ensuing exchange of letters between these groups had set the groundwork for a national network of libertarian women's organisations.

As the activity of these anarchist women's groups increased, Sánchez Saornil also began to contribute a number of articles about women's issues in the pages of the FAI's magazine Tierra y Libertad and the CNT's newspaper Solidaridad Obrera. In the latter, the CNT's general secretary Mariano R. Vázquez published two articles regarding women in the CNT. While he expressed his sympathies with women's struggles, he ended up insisting that women's liberation ought to be put aside until workers had won the class conflict. Sánchez Saornil responded with her own series of five articles titled "La cuestión femenina", which lay the groundwork for the establishment of a libertarian women's organization. She called for the creation of a women's liberation organisation ran by and for women. Her program suggested classes to raise women's literacy and education, apprenticeships in different sectors of industry, and groups for developing women's empowerment through consciousness raising.

These discussions set the groundwork for the establishment of the Mujeres Libres organisation, which Sánchez Saornil and Comaposada co-founded with the anarchist physician Amparo Poch y Gascón. This new anarchist feminist organisation set itself the goal of achieving women's liberation from their "triple enslavement" by ignorance, sexism and exploitation.

Within the organisation and as a writer for its homonymous magazine, Sánchez Saornil developed a reputation as a firebrand, a keen organiser and a powerful orator, reminding many libertarian women of the Parisian anarchist heroine Louise Michel. Sánchez Saornil wrote a number of articles for the Mujeres Libres journal, including an article on Castilian agricultural workers, intended to educate its readership in the big cities on rural life.

=== Civil War ===
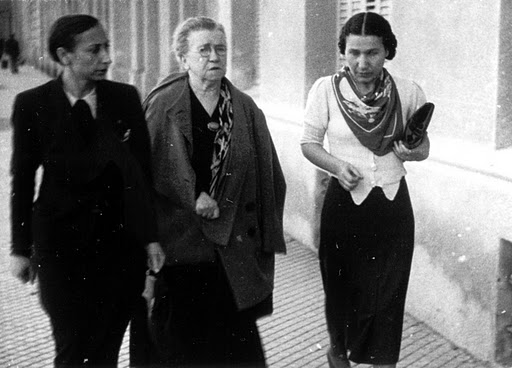
Lucía Sánchez Saornil (left) with Emma Goldman (center) in 1938

Following the outbreak of the Spanish Civil War, Sánchez Saornil joined in the defense of Madrid, working as a front line journalist and propagandist for the anarchists. She began to utilise her poetry as a form of agitprop, writing a series of poems that played an important role in Republican cultural production. Her writing attracted the attention of the anarchist Emma Goldman, who corresponded frequently with Sánchez Saornil, inspiring her to coordinate an international campaign to support the Spanish revolution.

Sánchez Saornil moved to the Republican capital of Valencia, where she became an editor in the anarchist press. As the Republicans faced a worsening subsistence crisis, exacerbated by refugees from the Nationalist zone and an embargo by Britain and France, she publicised the situation and fundraised for the republican cause. She became the general secretary of Solidaridad Internacional Antifascista (SIA) and made regular supply trips to the front-line, along with other Mujeres Libres and women of the CNT. Part of the goal in the Mujeres Libres visiting the front was for them to educate the militiamen and to create a "conscientious and responsible female force". Sánchez Saornil herself said:

"This feminine force that we wish to create and that we are creating has, of course, a purpose and a political destiny much greater than sewing uniforms for militiamen or visiting the sick [...] These are immediate needs, required by the circumstances [...] Our organization has other more far-reaching goals that inform its principles and that must, at all times, guide its actions."

Sánchez Saornil and Comaposada also requested the recognition of the Mujeres Libres by the government of Francisco Largo Caballero. But the government refused, stating that as the Mujeres Libres was not a formal organisation with committees and officials, they couldn't recognise it. In response, in August 1937, the Mujeres Libres held its first national conference and reorganised itself into a national federation, based on the model of the CNT. But even after reorganising, the Mujeres Libres still lacked broader support from the anarchist movement. In December 1938, the Casal de la Dona Treballadora was evicted by police and repossessed by the Ministry of the Interior, who turned it over to the Bank of Spain. Although the Iberian Anarchist Federation (FAI) responded to their requests for assistance, the CNT showed the Mujeres Libres little support. In a letter to the CNT's national committee, Sánchez Saornil wrote:

"It is a pity that you compañeros have always had so little time to acquaint yourselves with the valuable work of Mujeres Libres and that the consequence of this is the little interest you have shown in responding to our plea."

Sánchez Saornil also dismissed calls by the Communist-led Association of Antifascist Women to unite under their banner, as she believed the organisation was more than capable of continuing its direct action and consciousness raising without requiring standardisation within a state structure. She upheld the principle of unity in diversity, as she believed each women's organisation should maintain its own individual character, while each working towards women's emancipation. She declared:

"Mujeres Libres is not interested in 'feminine unity,' because that does not represent anything. We have called a thousand times for political and syndical unity, the only kind of unity that truly contributes to the cause [...] As long as differences [of politics and strategy] among the tendencies exist, a fusion of groups is impossible, because it is incompatible with human variety."

=== Later life ===
In February 1939, Catalonia fell to the Nationalists, forcing Sánchez Saornil to flee into exile in France, where she was briefly held in the Argelers concentration camp. After her release, she engaged in support work for Spanish republican refugees, which made her a target following the fall of France to Nazi Germany.

She was arrested but managed to escape before she could be taken to a Nazi concentration camp. At the height of the Francoist repression, she decided to return clandestinely to Spain. She lived there precariously but ultimately stayed under the radar, as she hadn't been publicly photographed during the civil war and most of her publications had been made anonymously. She was sheltered by a friend, who she had herself sheltered during the war, in Valencia, where she earned a living through contingent work. She accepted the defeat of the republic, but kept her own utopian hope alive through her writing.

Sánchez Saornil spent much of the rest of her life caring for her sister Conchita, who had a chronic condition, and lived for 30 years with her partner América Barroso. Months after the death of her sister, on 2 June 1970, Lucía Sánchez Saornil died. Barroso inscribed a line from one of her poems on her gravestone: "But can it be true that hope has died?"

== Writing ==
Sánchez Saornil wrote under the male pen name Luciano de San Saor. She wrote essays like "The Question of Feminism" and "The Women Question in our Media," followed by "A Summary on the Woman Question: For Compañero Vázquez," wherein she first developed her rationale for co-creating Mujeres Libres, both the journal and the organization. One of her more scathing essays, "The Marriage Ceremony or Spiritual Cowardice," delineates her critiques of marriage as a contract of sale.

== See also ==
- Anarcha-feminism
- Anarchism and issues related to love and sex § Mujeres Libres
- Anarchism in Spain

== Bibliography ==
- Ackelsberg, Martha A. (2005) [1991]. Free Women of Spain: Anarchism and the Struggle for the Emancipation of Women. Oakland, California: AK Press. ISBN 1-902593-96-0. LCCN 2003113040. OCLC 63382446.
- Graham, Helen (2009). "Sánchez Saornil, Lucía (1895–1970)". In Ness, Immanuel (ed.). The International Encyclopedia of Revolution and Protest. pp. 1–3. doi:10.1002/9781405198073.wbierp1301. ISBN 9781405198073.
- Kowal, Donna M. (2019). "Anarcha-Feminism". In Adams, Matthew S.; Levy, Carl (eds.). The Palgrave Handbook of Anarchism. London: Palgrave Macmillan. pp. 265–280. doi:10.1007/978-3-319-75620-2_15. ISBN 978-3319756196. S2CID 242073896.
- Linhard, Alexa Tabea (2005). Fearless Women in the Mexican Revolution and the Spanish Civil War. Columbia Missouri: University of Missouri Press. ISBN 0-8262-1611-0. LCCN 2005016913.
- Ludington, Zachary Rockwell (June 2017). "Where is Spain? The rappel à l'ordre and The Poetry of Lucía Sánchez Saornil". Hispanófila. 180 (1). University of North Carolina: 91–107. doi:10.1353/hsf.2017.0032. ISSN 2165-6185. S2CID 148726995.
- Nash, Mary (1995). Defying Male Civilization: Women in the Spanish Civil War. Denver: Arden Press. ISBN 0-912869-15-1. LCCN 95-18301.
- Nash, Mary (1999). "Un/Contested Identities: Motherhood, Sex Reform and the Modernization of Gender Identity in Early Twentieth-Century Spain". In Enders, Victoria Loree; Radcliff, Pamela Beth (eds.). Constructing Spanish Womanhood: Female Identity in Modern Spain. SUNY Press. pp. 25–50. ISBN 0-7914-4029-X. LCCN 98-6190.
