= Women's suffrage in Venezuela =

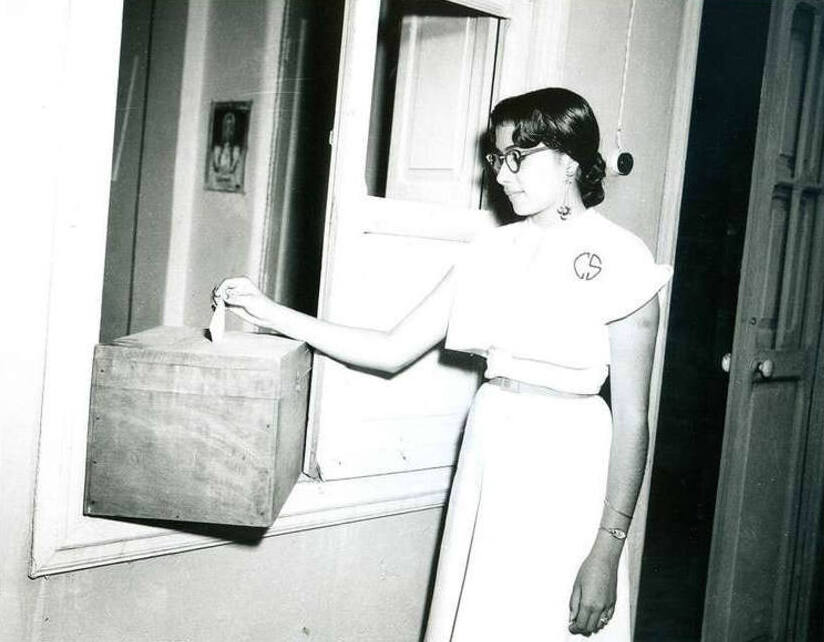
Venezuelan woman voting in the 1946 Venezuelan Constituent Assembly election, the first in which women participated

Women's suffrage in Venezuela was implemented in March 1946. After President Isaías Medina Angarita introduced municipal voting reforms in 1945, the Right to Universal Suffrage was established on March 15, 1946, and was constitutionalized on July 5, 1947, by President Rómulo Betancourt.

The women's movement in Venezuela started late compared to other countries, and did not fully organize until the 1930s. After the death of dictator Juan Vicente Gómez in 1935, Venezuela's first notable women's rights organization, the Asociacón Cultural Feminina (ACF), was founded and swiftly followed by others such as the Asociación Venezolana de Mujeres (AVM). The ACF was a leading organization in support of women's suffrage. Suffrage was supported by President Rómulo Betancourt, in his effort to appeal to women and minorities.

== History ==
Nationwide protests in 1928 catalyzed mobilization for women's suffrage. In 1935, women organized to author and publish formal demands to Venezuela's new President Eleazar López Contreras in “Mensaje de las Mujeres Venezolanas al General Eleazar López Contreras". Though the Constitution of 1811 abstractly granted citizenship rights to Venezuelans, subsequent iterations and suffrage laws limited women's eligibility to vote, with 1942 recognized as the year when Venezuelan women were first granted citizenship.

On May 5, 1945, reforms by President Medina Angarita allowed women to vote in municipal elections. Medina was succeeded by President Betancourt, who extended women's suffrage in his first 1945 - 1948 term.

On March 15, 1946, the Right to Universal Suffrage granted Venezuelans over the age of 18 the right to vote, without discrimination based on gender, literacy, or social status. This allowed women to vote and be elected in the October 27, 1946 National Constituent Assembly, with the first six women members of Parliament elected that year.

The July 5, 1947 Constitution established universal women's suffrage as a constitutional right.

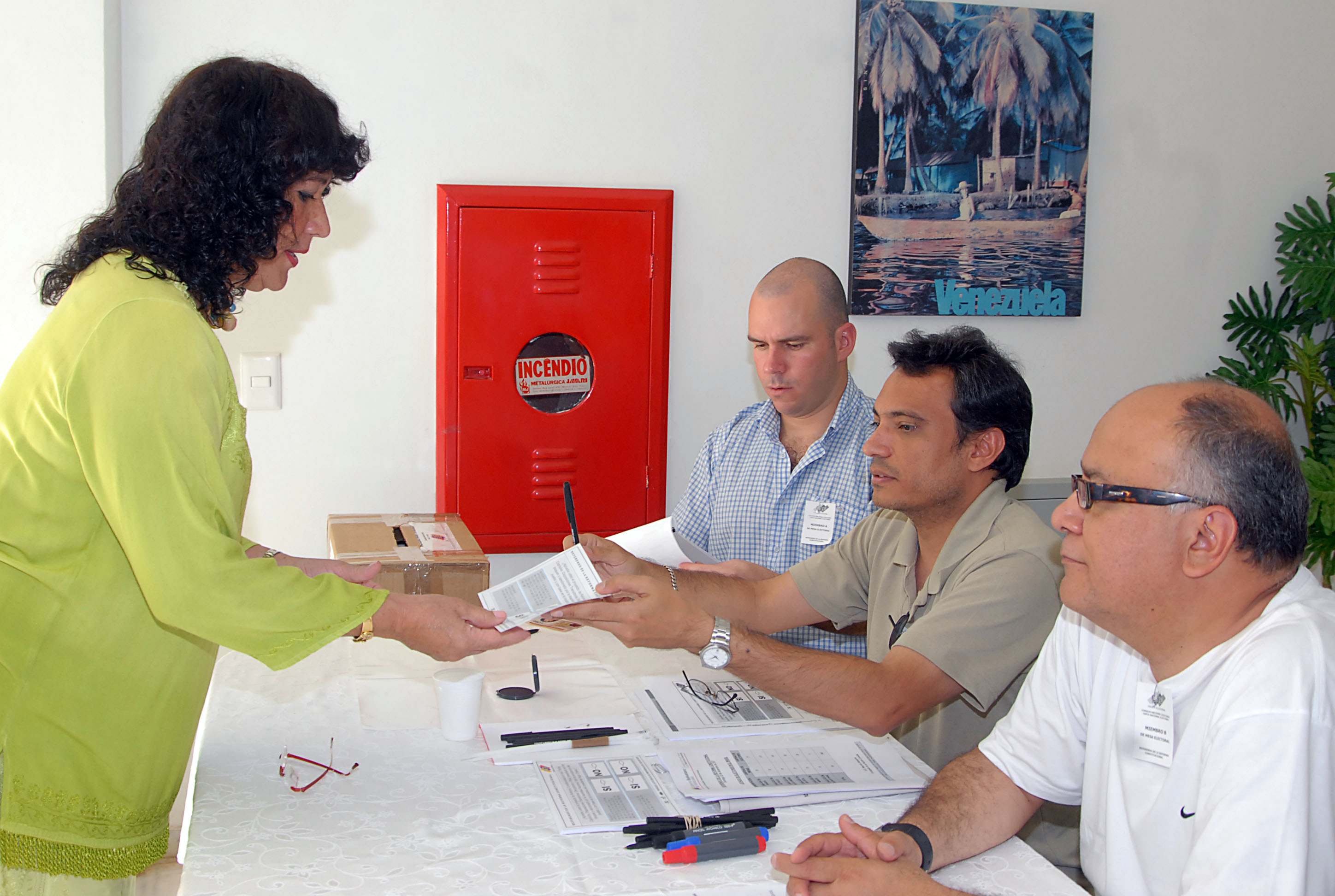
A Venezuelan living in Brazil participates in 2007 Constitutional Referendum voting at the Venezuelan Embassy

Women's suffrage, and electoral processes in general, regressed during the 1948 - 1958 period influenced by dictator Marcos Pérez Jiménez.

Free, general elections were reinstated in December 1958, resulting in Betancourt's return to the presidency. The Constitution of 1961 reaffirmed voting rights.

== See also ==
- Generation of 1928
- Mercedes Carvajal de Arocha
- Asociacón Cultural Feminina
- Aura Celina Casanova

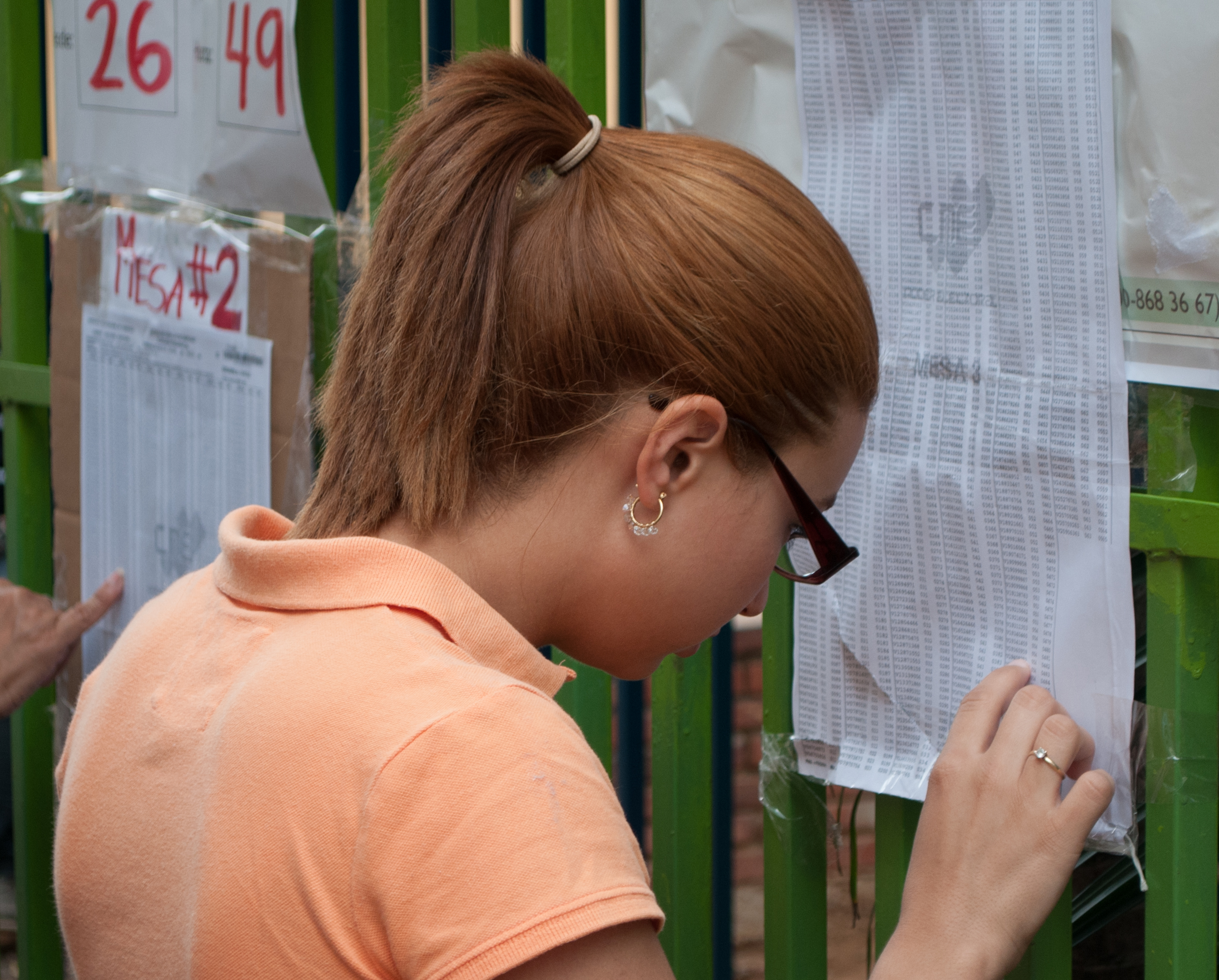
A voter looks for her ID card to identify her polling station in Maracaibo, Venezuela for the 2012 election
