= Mercedes Comaposada =

Mercè Comaposada i Guillén
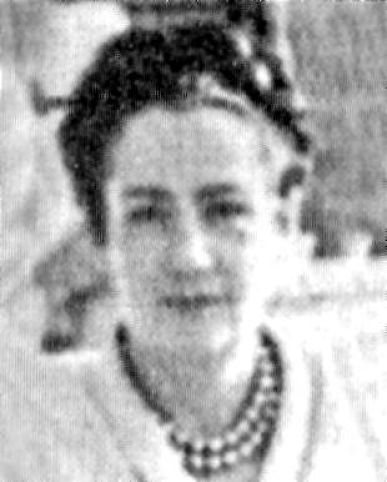
- Born: 14 August 1901; Barcelona, Spain
- Died: 11 February 1994 (aged 92); Paris, France
- Occupations: Lawyer, teacher
- Organization: Mujeres Libres
- Other political affiliations: Republican faction Confederación Nacional del Trabajo
- Movement: Anarcha-feminism
- Opponent: Nationalist faction
- Partner: Baltasar Lobo

Mercè Comaposada i Guillén (known in Spanish as Mercedes Comaposada Guillén; 1901–1994) was a Catalan pedagogue, lawyer, and anarcho-feminist. With Lucía Sánchez Saornil and Amparo Poch y Gascón, she was the co-founder of the libertarian women's organization, Mujeres Libres.

== Biography ==
Mercè Comaposada i Guillén, was born in Barcelona on 14 August 1901. The daughter of Josep Comaposada, a socialist shoemaker, she grew up in a militant and cultivated environment, learning to type at the age of twelve.

She left school at a very young age to start working as a film editor in a film production company. She later became a member of the Sindicato de Espectáculos Públicos de Barcelona, which belonged to the Confederación Nacional del Trabajo (CNT). Shortly afterwards she went to Madrid to continue her studies in law, taught by Antonio Machado and José Castillejo. At this stage in her life, during which she also trained as a pedagogue in order to teach other women, she met Lucía Sánchez Saornil, with whom she had the idea of setting up a libertarian women's group. During the 1930s, Sánchez and Comaposada taught male and female workers, in elementary instruction courses promoted by the CNT in Madrid. But they considered it necessary to make these courses specifically for women, in order to combat existing attitudes of misogyny.

In April 1936, together with Lucía Sánchez Saornil and Amparo Poch y Gascón, she founded the feminist organisation Mujeres Libres. That same month, Comaposada travelled to Barcelona and met with the Agrupación Cultural Femenina, which she convinced to join the new organisation. The Mujeres Libres grew rapidly, reaching a membership of more than 20,000 workers and peasants by 1938.

A month later, in May 1936, the first issue of the organisation's journal Mujeres Libres was published. The publication put out 12 issues and was active until 1938. Other women, such as Federica Montseny, Emma Goldman and Carmen Conde, collaborated in the development of the journal. Comaposada's partner, the sculptor Baltasar Lobo, worked on the journal as an illustrator.

Following the outbreak of the Spanish Civil War, Comaposada continued her work as an educator and her collaboration with the libertarian press. She wrote mainly for Tierra y Libertad (published by the FAI), Mujeres Libres (of which she was editor-in-chief) and Tiempos Nuevos, where she had a section dealing with subjects ranging from medicine to sexuality.

After the defeat of the Republicans, she was forced to go into exile in Paris with her partner, under the protection of Pablo Picasso, for whom she worked as a secretary. She also worked as a translator of Spanish authors, especially Lope de Vega, and as a representative of her partner's artistic work. During the 1960s and 1970s, she continued to collaborate on the publication of Mujeres Libres, Tierra y Libertad and Tiempos Nuevos, and joined other magazines such as Ruta y Umbral. After the death of Francisco Franco in 1975, she considered writing a book and asked veteran women for letters in which they wrote their own experiences. She wrote a manuscript which, after her death, disappeared along with the documentation.

== Selected works ==
- Esquemas (1937)
- Las mujeres en nuestra revolución (1937)
- La ciencia en la mochila (1938)
- Conversaciones cono los artistas españoles de la Escuela de París (1960, as Mercedes Guillén)
- Picasso (1973, as Mercedes Guillén)

== Bibliography ==
- Ackelsberg, Martha A. (2005) [1991]. Free Women of Spain: Anarchism and the Struggle for the Emancipation of Women. Oakland, California: AK Press. ISBN 1-902593-96-0. LCCN 2003113040. OCLC 63382446.
- Kaplan, Gisela (2012). Contemporary Western European Feminism. Routledge. ISBN 978-0-415-63681-0.
- Nash, Mary (1995). Defying Male Civilization: Women in the Spanish Civil War. Denver: Arden Press. ISBN 0-912869-15-1. LCCN 95-18301.
