= Solidaridad Internacional Antifascista =

Spanish humanitarian organization

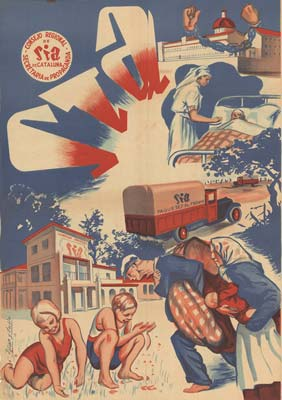
Poster by the SIA Catalonia Council (1937-1938).

Solidaridad Internacional Antifascista (SIA; "International Antifascist Solidarity") was a humanitarian organisation that existed in the Second Spanish Republic. It was politically aligned with the anarcho-syndicalist movement composed of the CNT, FAI and other groups. One of its general secretaries was Lucía Sánchez Saornil, an anarcha-feminist activist.

It engaged in publicity and fundraising in an attempt to assist the refugee-packed Spanish Republic during the Spanish Civil War. It collaborated with the Mujeres Libres organisation to provide assistance to refugees and wounded soldiers.

== Foundation ==
The decision to create the SIA was made in Valencia on 15 April 1937, but it did not effectively begin until June of that year, after the May Days in Barcelona pit anarchists and anti-Stalinist communists against the Spanish Republic, the Executive Council of Catalonia, and statist communists. It was originally conceived as a humanitarian organization that would support the Spanish Libertarian Movement and the Spanish Revolution. It served to spread anarchist ideas during the Spanish Civil War and allowed the CNT to gain material support from abroad.

== International Solidarity ==
Between its initial creation in June 1937 and the first months of 1939, several foreign sections were created. The first, created before the end of 1937, were the French, Swedish, British, Portuguese, and North African sections.

The Belgian section was founded on 18 May 1946 and brought together anti-Stalinist anti-fascists. The association organized the defence of asylum seekers and was a meeting place for immigrants, including Spanish CNT members in exile.

== See also ==
- Sara Berenguer, a member of the SIA
- Lucia Sanchez Saornil, press and propaganda secretary of the SIA
