= Asociación de Mujeres Antifascistas =

Spanish anti-fascist and feminist organization

The Association of Anti-Fascist Women (AMA) (Spanish: Asociación de Mujeres Antifascistas (AMA)) was an anti-fascist and a feminist political organization established during Spain's Second Republic by the Communist Party of Spain (Spanish: Partido Comunista de España (PCE)) in 1933.

Second Spanish Republic Coat of Arms in 1931-1939

AMA began to rise with the establishment of the Second Republic in Spain in 1931 and before the Spanish Civil War in 1936. With numerous institutional reforms throughout this Republic, the Association of Antifascist Women, after its 1933 creation, sought to expand women's political mobility and engagement. The Spanish Civil War in 1936 deepened the AMA's involvement within politics and society, extending the duties of this organization to take on wartime responsibilities. The Association of Anti-Fascist Women sought out political freedom and gender equality by notably aiding the military.

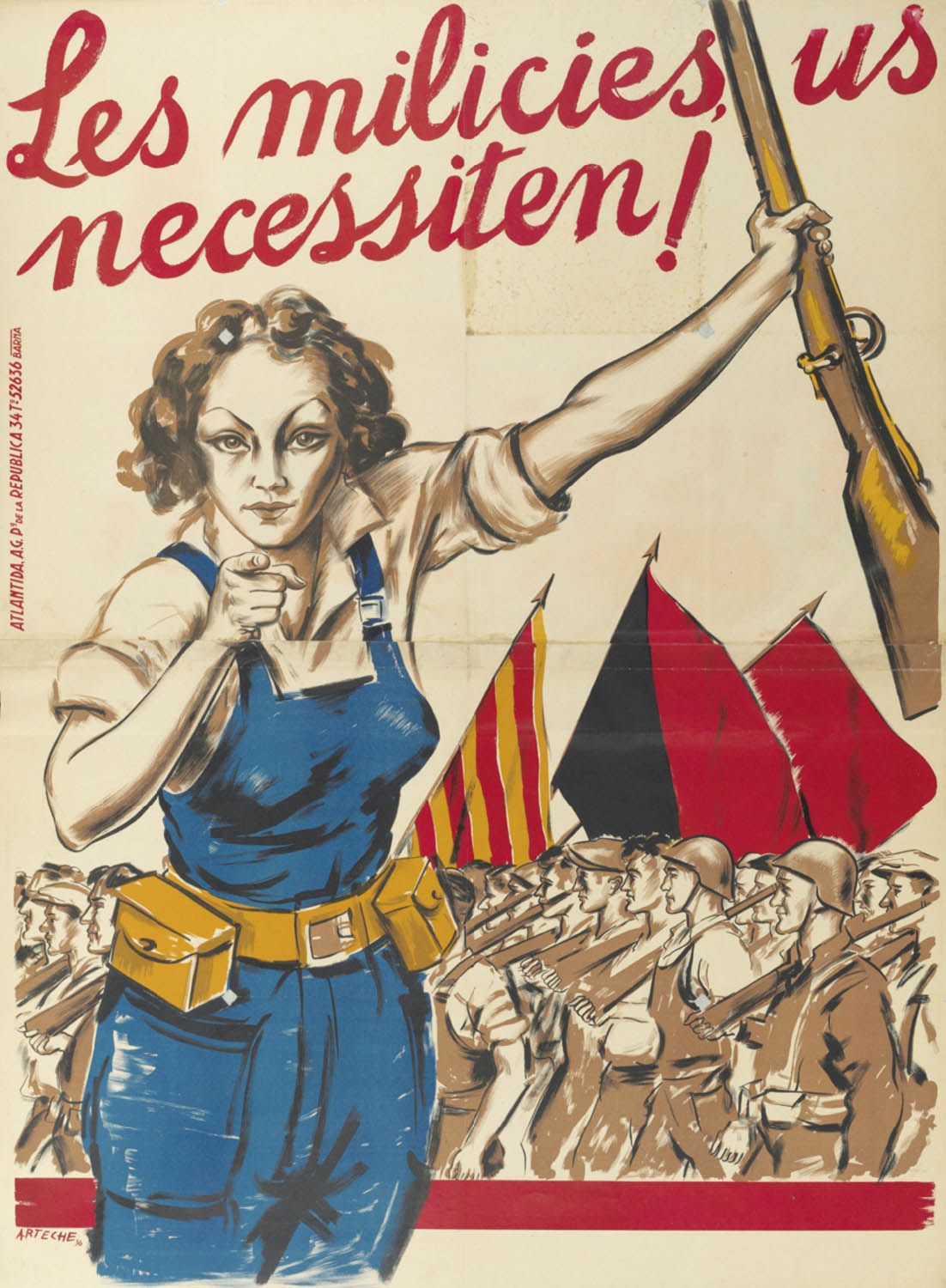
Propaganda utilized to recruit women to the Republican front, 1936.

In 1937, the Association of Anti-Fascist Women accumulated, at its peak, 50,000 members and various organizations in support of their efforts. AMA was not the only political or social organization in Spain during this time period interacting with women's rights and the Republic. Its interactions with other organizations such as the Mujeres Libres reveal the varied intentions and initiatives put forth for and by Spanish women during this time. AMA focused more on the economic capital women could produce, their entrance into the labor force, and their efforts to support the Spanish Republic during the Civil War. Mujeres Libres distrusted the Association of Anti-fascist Women due to the latter's inability to focus on women's liberation while their war time initiatives took place.

== Foundation of AMA and its role in the Spanish Civil War ==
The Second Spanish Republic lasted from 1931 to 1939 and was marked by deep political polarization between the left and the right. The Republic ushered progressive reforms such as separating Church and State and giving women the right to vote in 1931 which caused much backlash among conservative factions of Spanish society. The extension of women's suffrage (Article 36 of the new Constitution) empowered more women to engage politically and join organized movements. In the 1930s, as Europe experienced a rise in fascism, most notably Hitler in Germany and Mussolini in Italy, many left-wing parties around the world created Popular Front alliances. Women widely participated, forming Women Against War and Fascism, a movement launched in France and backed by the Communist International (Comintern) to unify women against fascism.

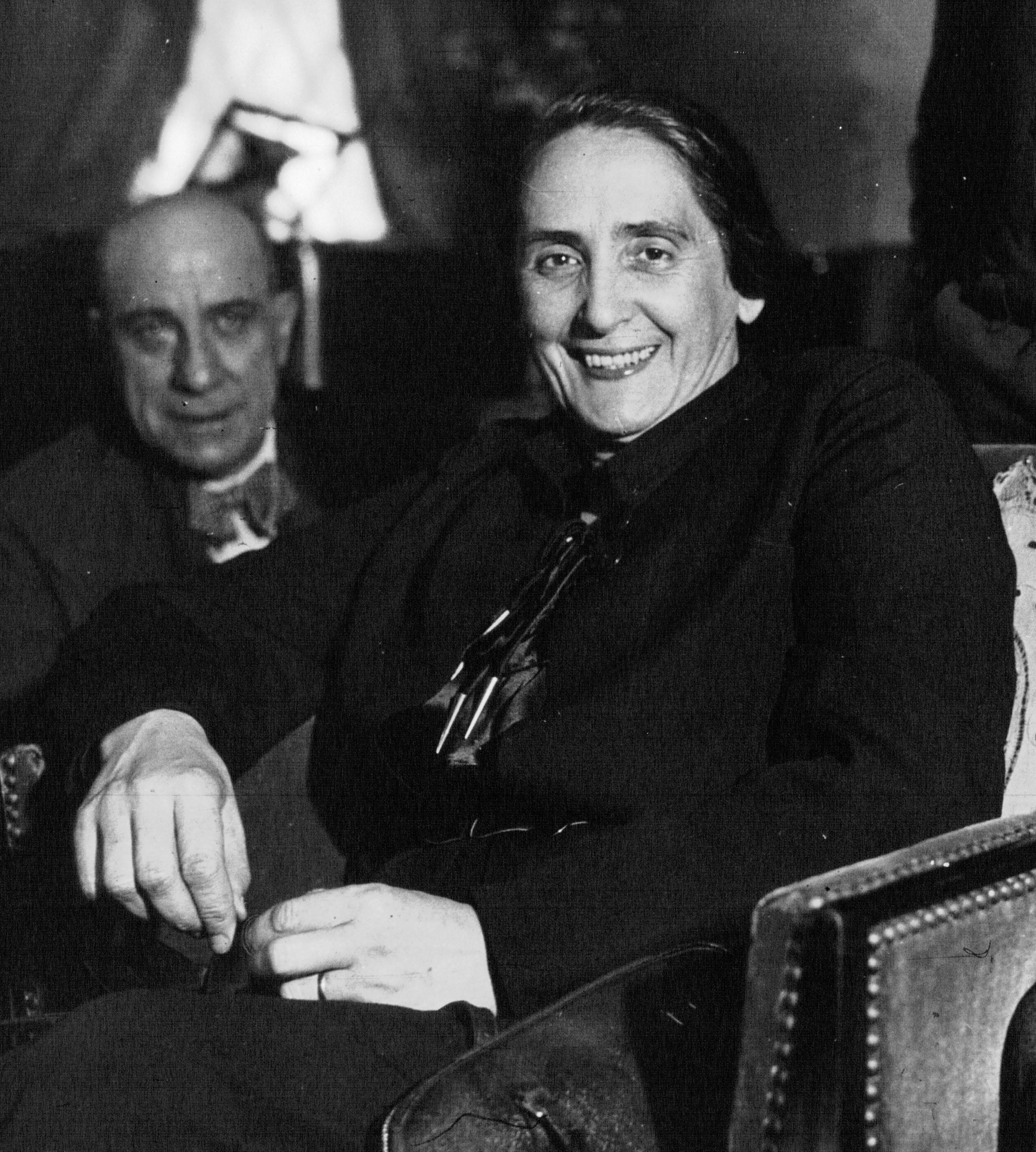
Spanish political leader Dolores Ibárruri known as La Pasionaria

In Spain, the Communist Party (Partido Comunista de España, PCE) founded the Association of Anti-Fascist Women (Asociación de Mujeres Antifascistas, AMA) in 1933, which originally began as the Spanish branch of Women Against War and Fascism and switched its name to Association of Anti-Fascist Women in 1936. The political organization was formally constituted in Madrid as a unitarian, feminist, and antifascist organization. The driving force behind the founding of AMA was Dolores Ibárruri, widely known as La Pasionaria. She was one of the most prominent figures of the Spanish-left at the time.

The Association of Anti-Fascist Women's early objectives included denouncing fascist militarism, organizing working-class women, and promoting solidarity with antifascist movements abroad. By 1934, regional committees were formed in Barcelona, Valencia, Bilbao, and Seville. Local gatherings brought together women from various backgrounds including regular workers, intellectual elites, as well as party militants. After the Asturian miners' uprising (1934), AMA activists intensified their organizing to help imprisoned workers' families.

As the Spanish Civil War broke out in July 1936, the organization held its first congress and its members increasingly adopted a militant stance against Francisco Franco's Nationalists. Once the war began, AMA became one of the most active women's groups in Spain, comparable only to Mujeres Libres (linked to the anarcho-syndicalist CNT) and Unión de Muchachas (affiliated with the Unified Socialist Youth, JSU). During the Civil War (1936-1939), AMA united with other organizations such as the Unión de Muchachas, the Unió de Dones de Catalunya, and the Aliança Nacional de Dones Joves. AMA also coordinated with the Partido Comunista de España and the Republican government to form Women's Relief Committees (Spanish: Comités de Auxilio Femenino). Many women in the organization were tasked with providing medical support, food, and childcare for displaced families. On the military side, women in AMA volunteered as nurses as well as frontline combatants and factory workers. During the organization's height (1937-1938), the organization claimed over 50,000 members and more than 225 local groups across Spain.

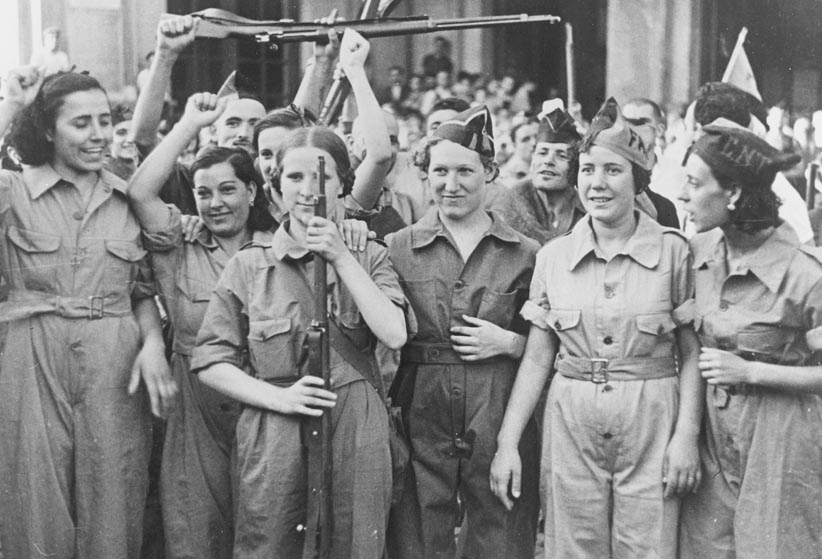
Women soldiers of the Republic front in 1937 during the Civil War

Despite being rooted in the Communist Party, the Association of Anti-Fascist Women attracted individuals from a wide range of progressive and feminist backgrounds, some of whom maintained ties with other leftist movements. Notable figures in AMA included: Margarita Nelken, Matilde Cantos, and Pilar Soler, while Lina Ódena, Encarnación Fuyola, and Emilia Elías were important leaders that succeeded the founder, Ibárruri.

AMA's creation reflected a global movement of antifascist women's organizing, and it was linked to many other antifascist groups in France, Britain, Mexico, and elsewhere in Latin America. The Republican front lost the Civil War in 1939, leading to Franco's dictatorship which banned the association. In the following years, many members were imprisoned, executed, or went into exile (exilio republicano). Exiled members found each other in France, forming the Unión de Mujeres Antifascistas Españolas (UMAE) in 1946, which continued AMA's transnational legacy.

== Mobilization and campaigns ==
On April 14, 1931, the Second Spanish Republic implemented a revised constitution that ensured women's labor rights, marriage rights, maternity assistance, right to vote, and potential to serve in public office. Despite these republican reforms, the 1933 general election secured key victories for right-wing parties, practically reversing the measures towards gender equality. When the Spanish Civil War broke out in 1936, the Association of Anti-Fascist Women (Asociación de Mujeres Antifascistas, AMA) priorities shifted towards winning the war, with the hope that the pursuit for social equality could be resumed after the Republican forces' victory. These goals included: fighting against fascism and for peace, defending women's culture and children's access to education, demonstrate self-determination and equal justice, and finally to incorporate women into the political and social life of Spain.

Within this context, AMA initiated multiple campaigns to recruit women to the frontlines of the Republican war effort. AMA worked closely with the Ministries of War and Industry, forming the Women's Aid Commission (Spanish: Comisión de Auxilio Femenino) through a decree issued on August 29, 1936. Per this decree, AMA members organized sewing workshops to fashion uniforms for Republican soldiers, orphanages to house children affected by the war, brigades to replace men who left their jobs in urban sectors to serve the Republican army, and went into rural areas to teach women how to farm in order to avoid food shortages.

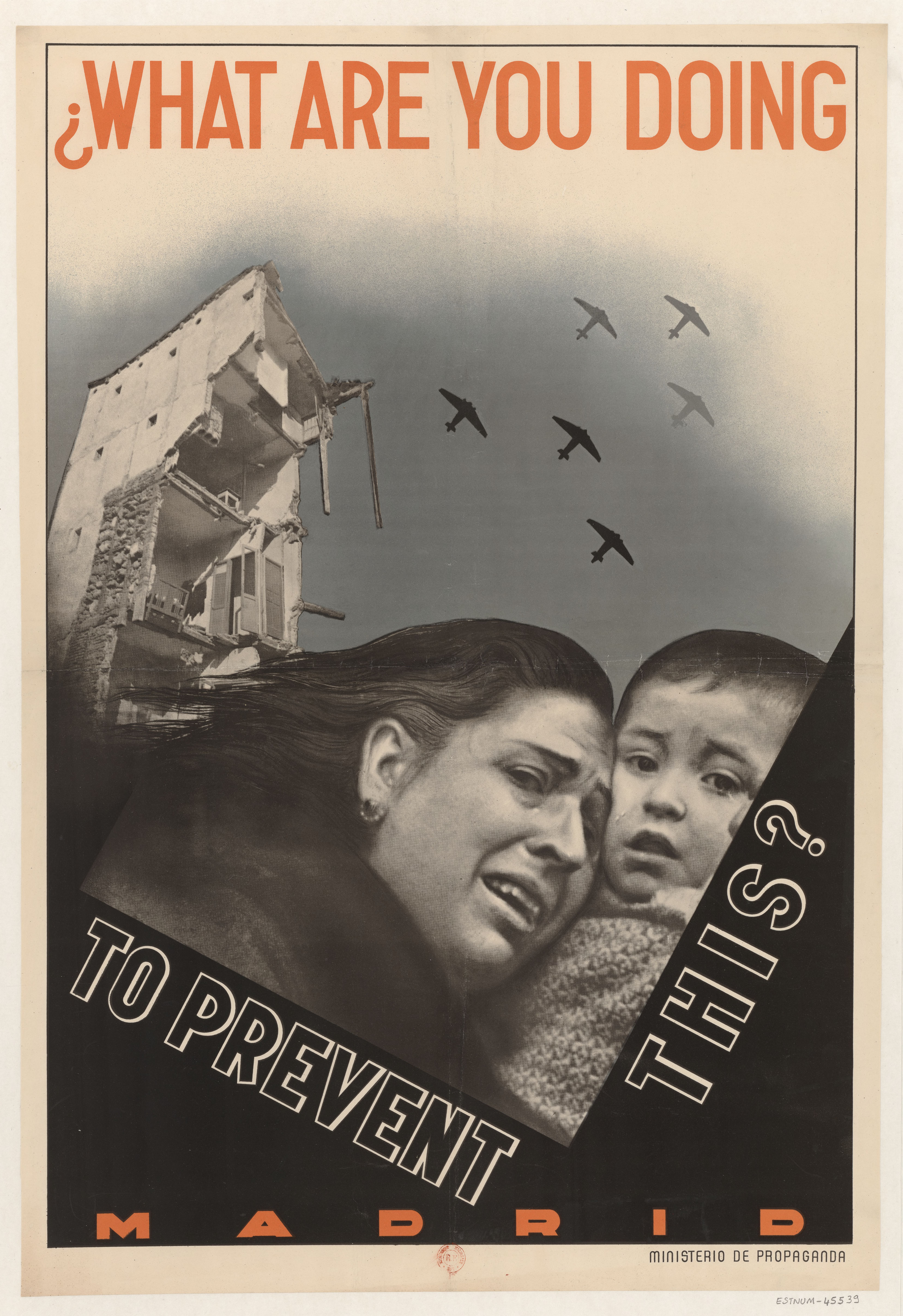
Translated propaganda utilized during the Spanish Civil War

Outside of these state-sanctioned efforts, AMA sought new ways to share their propaganda with Spanish women of all political backgrounds. Throughout the 1930s, the organization distributed posters, spreading the message that fascism was the enemy of all women, relegating them to the bottom rungs in society under a patriarchal system. The images on these posters depicted women dressed 'masculine' with texts that portrayed women to be equal in strength with men, and encouraging women to participate on the front line of the Civil War. As the war unfolded, political organizations such as AMA were not as needed on the frontlines, and instead shifted their focus on women returning to more traditional roles in the workforce and political society. The organization relied on magazine publications like Mujeres Antifascistas Españolas, also known as Mujeres, to disseminate information about their war-time efforts aiming to appeal to all women and unite them against fascism. They promoted legislation including equal pay, state-funded nurseries, equal treatment in the job-hiring process, and a quota system in which one-third of political representatives would be women. Their monthly publications gave rise to other regional editions in Bilbao and Valencia titled Pasionaria, in reference to AMA's founder. Part of AMA's effort to create local committees for the cause, these disseminated texts were a vital instrument of propaganda and organizing the actions of members across the nation.

As the president and symbol of AMA, Ibárruri, initiated various propaganda campaigns from the Civil War's inception. Her famous slogans, "They shall not pass!" and "It is better to die on your feet than to live on your knees," served as words of resistance against the Fascist takeover. She was appointed Honorary Commander of the Fifth Regiment of Republican Troops for her strength and persistent opposition to fascism.

== In conflict with Mujeres Libres ==
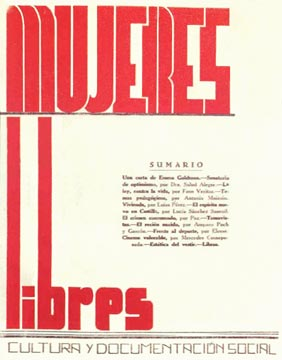
The first issue of the Mujeres Libres magazine from 1936.

The Association of Antifascist Women was not alone in their effort to mobilize women and campaign against Franco's regime in the 1930s. For various feminist organizations, the role that women would play after the war was of great concern. To answer this question, Mujeres Libres was founded in 1936 around an anarchist ideology that came in conflict with AMA's communist associations. In contrast with Mujeres Libres, who saw the civil war as an opportunity to completely dismantle the patriarchy, AMA focused on political reform campaigns, and rallying women in support of the Republican effort to oust fascism. Mujeres Libres was not satisfied with the fight for women's rights within the present political system, and vehemently opposed AMA for their focus on mobilizing women to work for the Republican goals, rather than addressing the subordination of women directly. Stemming from its anarcho-syndicalist foundations, Mujeres Libres was in direct competition with the Association of Antifascist Women, each striving to recruit Spanish working women to their separate causes.

The Association of Antifascist Women faced criticism for marketing themselves as a non-partisan group. Despite attracting members across party lines, AMA defined their goals in alignment with the Communist war effort and working within their political framework for women's rights. Furthermore, AMA's call for unity among different ideological and political feminisms was opposed by Mujeres Libres who distrusted AMA's motives and saw their campaign efforts as simply rallying support for the Communist cause under the guise of winning the war. Conflicts can be traced to various meetings, such as the Conference of Anti-Fascist Women of 1937, held in Valencia, in which AMA prioritized women's role in the labor sector as well as their militaristic efforts, rather than a clear plan to improve women's social conditions. In retrospect, scholars highlight that AMA's war efforts overshadowed their gender-specific campaigns, leading to conflict with other feminist organizations.

== Impact and legacy ==
After the Spanish Civil War, obstacles under Franco's rule made organizing more difficult, leading many AMA women exiles to funnel into the Union of Antifascist Spanish Women (Spanish: Unión de Mujeres Antifascistas Españolas (UMAE)) in France. Ibárruri served as the President of UMAE, while in exile from Spain and attempting to maintain spirits of the resistance. UMAE utilized their magazine Mujeres Antifascistas to deliver messages regarding clandestine activities taking place and publish slogans in the section titled "News From Within" (Spanish: Noticias del Interior). With restrictions on AMA's activities and mobilization in Franco's Spain, UMAE attempted to mobilize their members in exile, through the medium of slogans. In 1944, the UMAE employed the slogan "Operation Reconquest of Spain" (Spanish: Operación Reconquista de España) or "Help our heroic guerillas!" (Spanish: Ayudad a nuestros heroicos guerrilleros) to recenter motivations against the Franco regime.

At the national level, the AMA publication, Mujeres, spread knowledge about politics to educate women on their political mobility, creating a ripple effect internationally influencing Spanish women, who had been exiled, to organize abroad. Publications such as Mujeres Antifascistas Españolas in Mexico started as a result of these global pockets of anti-fascist women. These international publications assisted in constructing a feminist identity for women abroad and pushed them to rebuild connections that were broken due to the civil war and exile.

Through various campaigns, AMA built educational networks that trained women for needed roles during the civil war. For example, in collaboration with the Ministerio de Sanidad y Asistencia Social (Ministry of Health and Social Assistance), AMA developed a course that offered women, who did not know how to read and write, the opportunity to become nurses. These educational courses worked towards alleviating the shortage of nurses by providing specific support to women who previously weren't able to be involved.
