= Mary Nash (historian) =

Irish historian living in Catalonia (born 1947)

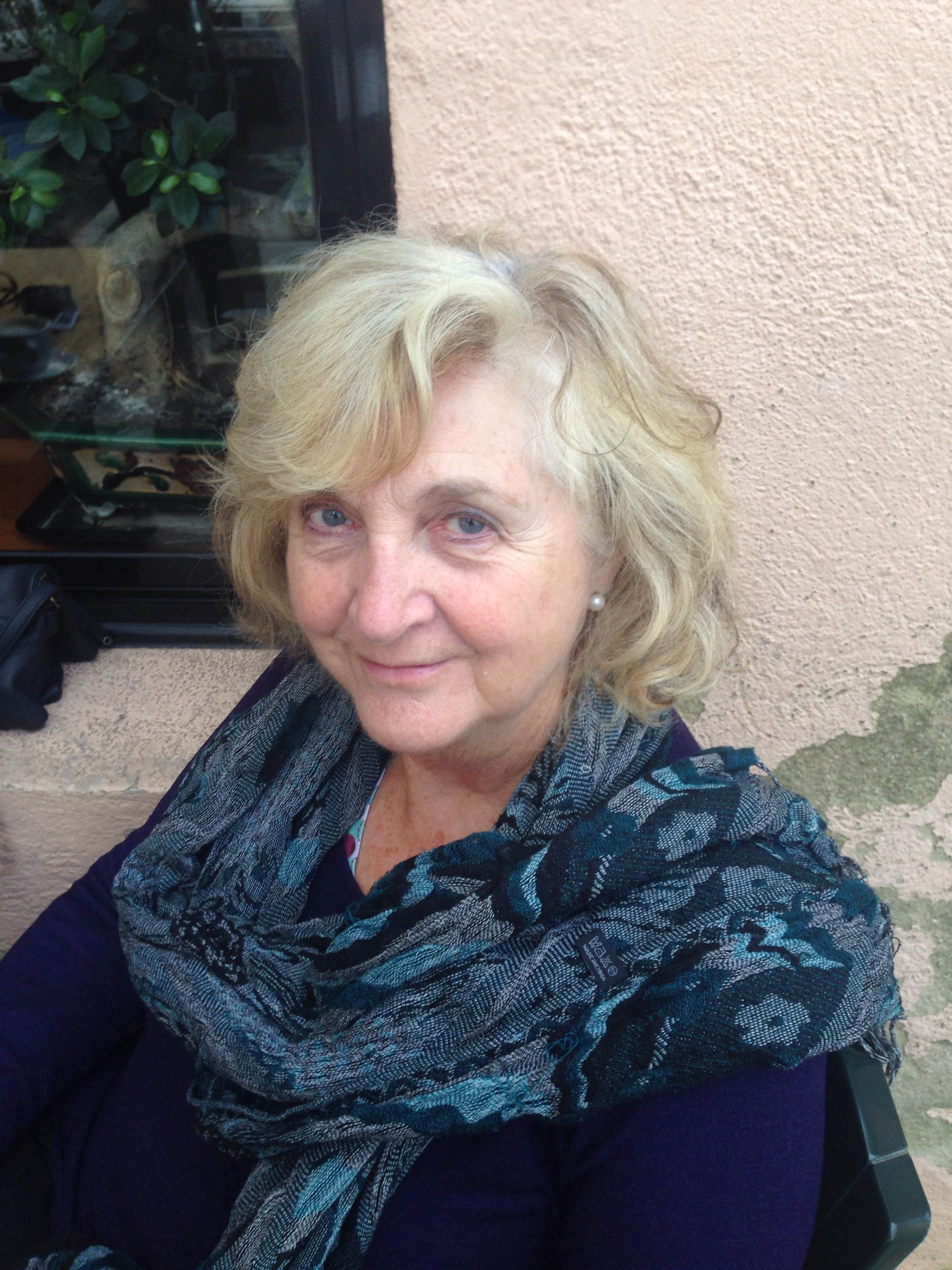
- Nash in 2014
- Born: Mary Josephine Nash Baldwin; 1947 (age 78–79); Limerick, Ireland
- Education: University of Barcelona
- Occupations: Academic, writer
- Employer: University of Barcelona
- Awards: Creu de Sant Jordi (1995)

Mary Josephine Nash Baldwin (born 1947) is an Irish historian, professor and author living in Barcelona, Catalonia (Spain). She has specialized in the study of the history of women and feminism in Spain.

She has been a Spanish citizen since 1970 and currently resides between Barcelona and Caldas de Malavella, Spain. She was a pioneer in the introduction of the study of women's history and gender in Spanish universities. She is a specialist in women's history, gender history, cultural and gender representations, social movements, political cultures and cultural diversity in the twentieth century. Her pioneering research focused on women, citizenship and anti-fascist resistance during the Second Spanish Republic and the Spanish Civil War. She has published on feminism, gender and citizenship, political cultures and the changing boundaries between public and private. Her research has been dedicated to the history of women under the Franco dictatorship and she has also published on feminism during the Spanish Transition to democracy. Another area of research focuses on the intersection between discourses of otherness, cultural diversity, gender, and mass tourism as transformative scenarios of social and gender practices in Catalan and Spanish society.

== Biography ==
In 1967 she graduated in History and French civilization at the National University of Ireland in Cork. On completing a postgraduate degree in history at the University Institute of European Studies in Turin, Italy, in 1968, she then moved to Barcelona. In 1974, still under the Franco dictatorship, she inaugurated the first academic course on the history of feminism and women at the University of Barcelona, where she obtained her Ph.D. in 1977 with a thesis on Women in left-wing political organizations in Spain, 1931-1939. In 1982 she founded and directed the Center for Historical Research on Women (CIHD), University of Barcelona, the first university center in Spain dedicated to the history of women. In 1991 she directed the first university postgraduate degree in gender studies on non-sexist coeducation.

Since 1988 she is a founding member of the editorial board of the history journal Historia Social. [1] She participated in the first meeting of the national committee of the International Federation for Research in Women's History (IFRWH) in 1989 in Bellagio, Italy. In 1990 she promoted the creation of the Interuniversity Commission that led to the foundation of the Spanish Association for Women's Historical Research (AEIHM) in 1991. She was the founding president of the AEIHM in its first stage (1991-1997). [2] In 1994 she co-founded Arenal, revista de historia de las mujeres, of which she continued as co-director until 2025. In 1997 she founded the Consolidated Research Group Multiculturalism and Gender at the University of Barcelona dedicated to a gender perspective on otherness.

In 1984 she won the Emilia Pardo Bazán prize for her book Presencia y protagonismo. Aspects of women's history. In 1995 the Generalitat of Catalonia awarded him the Saint George Cross. In 2008 she received the President Macià Medal of Work, a distinction awarded to initiative in scientific research. In 2010 she was awarded an Honorary Doctorate by the University of Granada[3] and in 2018 an honorary doctorate by the Rovira i Virgili University, Tarragona. She has also received the Territories of Memory Award (2020) in recognition of her dedication to the recovery of the historical memory of women. She was President of the Humanities Commission of the Agency for University Excellence of the Generalitat de Catalunya. In 2022, the University of Barcelona promoted her candidacy for the Princess of Asturias Award for Social Sciences. In 2024 she was awarded the Sapiens Honor Award for her pioneering career in the history of women.

She collaborated with the European Network of Women's Studies of the Council of Europe in relation to democratic transitions and women's equality and rights. She has collaborated with UNESCO and the European Commission. She is a member of the Advisory Board of several academic journals and is the author of numerous books and academic articles translated to different languages. She was Professor of Contemporary History since 1991 at the University of Barcelona. She is currently Professor Emeritus at the University of Barcelona.

== Books ==
- Mujer y movimiento obrero en España. Barcelona: Fontamara, 1981.
- Experiencias desiguales: conflictos sociales y respuestas colectivas: siglo XIX. Susanna Tavera, Mary Nash. Madrid: Síntesis, 1994.
- Defying Male Civilization: Women in the Spanish Civil War. Denver: Arden Press, 1995.
- Rojas: las mujeres republicanas en la Guerra Civil española. Madrid: Taurus, 1999 (Spanish version of Defying Male Civilization: Women in the Spanish Civil War (1995); translated by Irene Cifuentes, as the basis of her doctoral thesis.
- Mujeres en el Mundo. Historia, retos y movimientos. Madrid: Alianza, 2004.
- Inmigrantes en nuestro espejo: inmigración y discurso periodístico en la prensa española. Barcelona: Icaria/Antrzyt, 2005.
- Dones en transició: de la resistència política a la legitimitat feminista: les dones en la Barcelona de la Transició. Barcelona: Ajuntament de Barcelona, 2007.
- Trabajadoras: un siglo de trabajo femenino en Cataluña [1900-2000]. Barcelona: Generalitat de Catalunya, 2010.
