= Mujeres Libres =

Anarchist women's organization in Spain

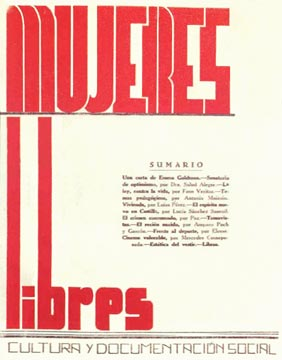
- Founders: Lucía Sánchez Saornil; Amparo Poch y Gascón; Mercedes Comaposada
- Founded: April 1936 (Note: Various groups that would become part of Mujeres Libres were formed as early as 1934. April 1936 is the date given by the National Library of France here.)
- Dissolved: February 1939
- Membership (1938): 30,000
- Ideology: Anarcha-feminism
- Political position: Far-left
- National affiliation: CNT (Note: While Mujeres Libres was strongly associated with the CNT due to overlapping membership, it remained fully autonomous throughout its existence. See Autonomy.)

Mujeres Libres (English: Free Women) was an anarchist women's organisation that existed in Spain from 1936 to 1939. Founded by Lucía Sánchez Saornil, Mercedes Comaposada, and Amparo Poch y Gascón as a small women's group in Madrid, it rapidly grew to a national federation of 30,000 members at its height in the summer of 1938.

It emerged from the Spanish anarcho-syndicalist movement, composed of three main organisations: the CNT union; the FAI federation; and the FIJL youth wing. Many women who participated in these groups felt that their issues were being ignored by the predominantly male anarchists. As a result, the autonomous Mujeres Libres groups were created, pursuing both women's liberation and the anarchist social revolution. They argued that the two objectives were equally important and should be pursued in parallel. Aiming towards the empowerment of working class women, they organised activities ranging from education programs and technical classes to childcare centres and maternity care.

While Mujeres Libres sought recognition as the fourth main organisation within the anarchist movement, they never formally achieved equal status to the other branches. Founded in the Second Spanish Republic, the group followed the anarchists in supporting the Republican faction when the Spanish Civil War began. Upon victory by the opposing Nationalist forces in 1939, Mujeres Libres collapsed, and the anarchist movement as a whole was outlawed.

== Context ==
Women in Spain in the years before 1936 were markedly unequal to men. In employment, they dealt with poor working conditions, ranging from unhygienic workplaces to a consistently lower pay than men for the same work. The literacy rate across Spain in this period was low for both men and women, but consistently lower for the latter. The female illiteracy rate in 1930 reached as high as 60% in the southern parts of Spain, and as high as 30% in the Basque region. This limited the political involvement and social mobility of working class women.

Women were also largely confined to the domestic sphere. Typically, women had the primary responsibility for raising children, restricting them in ways men did not experience. Where women were employed, they usually worked in the home, doing either domestic work or working in their own house, doing piecework in industries such as textiles.

=== Women in the anarchist movement ===
The anarchist movement was nominally committed to equality, declaring that "the two sexes will be equal, both in rights and in obligation." In practice, however, there were numerous shortcomings with respect to this goal. The unequal nature of Spanish society meant that women constituted a minority in most workplaces, stifling the capacity of women to participate in the CNT in particular. Even where women represented a majority, the anarchist trade unions made little effort to organise women, perceiving them as potential strike-breakers.

One reason that sexist beliefs remained so prominent was that Pierre-Joseph Proudhon, often referred to as 'the father of anarchism', had openly believed that women were inferior, and advocated in his writings that women should remain in domestic roles even following the anarchist revolution.

Even for the most egalitarian-minded men, it has been commented that "the anarchist utopia stopped at the front door". Sara Berenguer and Pepita Carpeña, who later became members of Mujeres Libres, reported witnessing sexism in FIJL youth groups, which were notable hotbeds of such behaviour.

== Founding ==
Other anarchist women, notably Lucía Sánchez Saornil and Mercedes Comaposada, had similar experiences with sexism. Following their realisation of the extent of sexism within the CNT in 1933, the two began discussing the issue. By 1935, they had begun to form the first Mujeres Libres group in Madrid. Together with Dr Amparo Poch y Gascón, the three women are considered the 'initiators' of the Mujeres Libres movement, an effort to empower Spanish women.

In 1934, a similar but separate group was founded in Barcelona by CNT members, including Soledad Estorach, in an effort to involve women in the anarchist movement. The Grupo Cultural Feminino or 'Feminine Culture Group' was thus formed, growing into a Catalan regional organisation entirely independently of Mujeres Libres.

When the two groups discovered each other in late 1936, the latter decided to affiliate itself with the Madrid group, and renamed itself Agrupación Mujeres Libres. As time went on, numerous other Mujeres Libres branches formed across the country. They remained essentially independent of each other in all but name until, in August 1937, 90 local Mujeres Libres groups formally established a national federation. As the movement grew, it reached a height of 30,000 members in the summer of 1938.

=== Magazine ===
From September to November 1935, Lucía Sánchez Saornil and CNT National Secretary Mariano Rodríguez Vázquez corresponded publicly through the pages of the anarchist newspaper Solidaridad Obrera regarding the position of women within the anarchist movement. Rodríguez Vázquez was generally sympathetic towards the position of women, recognising that many men held a position of power over their partners at home, and even offering that Solidaridad Obrera dedicate one page each week to women. However, Sánchez Saornil was sharply critical of the way in which anarchist women were encouraged into the movement, arguing with reference to men's sexist attitudes that "The vast majority of male comrades... have minds infected with the most typical bourgeois prejudices."

Combined with her dissatisfaction with Vázquez's assertion that men were not to blame for holding onto their privilege by neglecting the cause of women, this led her to announce in one article her intention to create of a full journal devoted entirely to the cause of women, rather than just one page. The announcement in April of the following year that this project would go ahead generated widespread support among anarchists and marked the full emergence of the Mujeres Libres organisation into the public eye. The first issue of the Mujeres Libres magazine was published on May 20, 1936, and ran for 14 issues.

== Philosophy ==
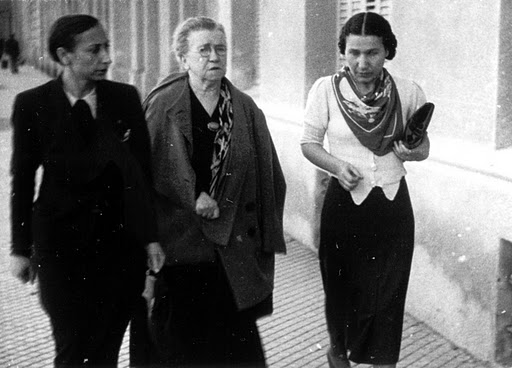
Lucía Sánchez Saornil (left), with influential American anarchist Emma Goldman (middle)

As participants in the anarcho-syndicalist movement, Mujeres Libres believed in the abolition of the state and of capitalism. Many anarchists at the time presumed that gender inequality was a product of these economic hierarchies, and that it would disappear once the social revolution had been achieved. However, following their negative experiences within male-dominated anarchist groups, the anarchist women who founded Mujeres Libres began to reject the idea that the struggle for gender equality was subordinate to the wider class struggle for economic equality.

This was reflected in their statement of purpose, which argued that women should be emancipated from their "triple enslavement"—to their own ignorance, to gender inequality, and to capitalism. The reference to 'ignorance' stemmed from a belief that women had an additional 'internal' struggle to overcome—women had to respect themselves in order to gain respect from and achieve equality with men.

=== Views on feminism ===
While Mujeres Libres believed that men and women were equal, they rejected the label of feminism. Instead, they typically referred to their ideology as 'humanism'. This was because they believed that gender inequality could not be solved separately from economic inequality. For example, they believed that prostitution was a form of exploitation of women that arose partially due to the desperate circumstances of poverty; as a result, their attempts to eradicate the practice focused on creating women's shelters rather than banning the practice.

=== Autonomy ===
Compared to other leftist women's organizations in Spain at the time, Mujeres Libres was unique in that it insisted on remaining autonomous from its sister organisations, the male-dominated CNT, FAI, and FIJL. They did so in order to fully address women's issues, arguing that autonomy and separation would allow them to act independently towards organising and empowering women (goals which they saw other anarchist groups as having neglected). It insisted it was an integral part of the libertarian movement, but it still chose not to request voting delegates at meetings of the three other organisations. It did so to preserve its autonomy—Mujeres Libres wished to participate in the movement, but it did not wish be bound by its resolutions and thus lose independence.

=== Mujeres Libres Anthem ===
The Mujeres Libres Anthem, written by Lucía Sánchez Saornil in 1937, reads as follows:

Spanish

Puño en alto mujeres de Iberia
hacia horizontes preñados de luz
por rutas ardientes,
los pies en la tierra
la frente en lo azul.

Afirmando promesas de vida
desafiemos la tradición
modelemos la arcilla caliente
de un mundo que nace del dolor.

¡Qué el pasado se hunda en la nada!
¡qué nos importa el ayer!
Queremos escribir de nuevo
la palabra MUJER.

Puño en alto mujeres del mundo
hacia horizontes preñados de luz,
por rutas ardientes,
adelante, adelante,
de cara a la luz.

English Translation

Fists upraised, women of Iberia
towards horizons pregnant with light
on paths afire
feet on the ground
face to the blue sky.

Affirming the promise of life
let's defy tradition
we mold the warm clay
of a new world born of pain.

Let the past vanish into nothingness!
What do we care for yesterday!
We want to write anew
the word WOMAN.

Fists upraised, women of the world
towards horizons pregnant with light
on paths afire
onward, onward
toward the light.

== Actions and achievements ==
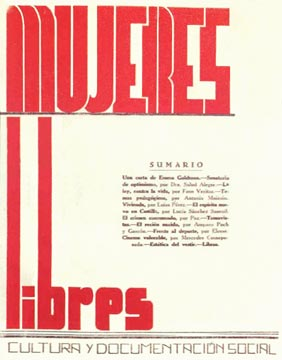
The first edition of Mujeres Libres, the magazine published by the organisation

The chief aims of Mujeres Libres were the incorporation of more women into the anarchist movement, and the empowerment of women within it. To this end, the groups' first actions were the creation of networks of women through the creation of women-only social groups. The existence of these groups increased the visibility of anarchist women and bolstered their cause, particularly by providing a space to discuss strategies for combating sexism on both individual and collective levels.

The organization produced propaganda through radio, travelling libraries, and propaganda tours, in order to promote their cause. Organizers and activists travelled through rural parts of Spain to set up rural collectives and support women in the country, encouraging women to become anarchist and participate in both Mujeres Libres and the CNT. Mujeres Libres also produced their women-run magazine, alongside various pamphlets and other publications, to keep its members informed. The magazine addressed working class women and focused on "awakening the female conscience toward libertarian ideas."

Mujeres Libres often collaborated with the anarchist humanitarian organisation Solidaridad Internacional Antifascista, of which Lucía Sánchez Saornil was general secretary. They provided assistance to refugees and wounded soldiers during the Civil War.

=== Workplace and employment ===
One of the core areas in which Mujeres Libres sought to empower women was in the workplace. Viewing women's participation in economic activity as a core part of their emancipation, they formed 'labour sections' to help to encourage women into work. This objective was bolstered by the fact that many working men had become soldiers, and so unions were more comfortable to employ women as a necessity, extending even to apprenticeship programmes.

Women involved in Mujeres Libres filled gaps in the economy in a huge variety of areas. They formed divisions dedicated to transport, sanitation, manufacturing, metallurgy, and public service, alongside 'mobile brigades' which completed any unfinished work. They supplied food both to militias and to urban communities, including the creation of communal kitchens; and they helped to unionize the 15,000 women working in food services and public transport in the two main cities of Madrid and Barcelona.

==== In the military ====
Even at the battlefront, women mainly filled auxiliary roles. In reaction to this, Mujeres Libres organised support for the inclusion and training of women soldiers (such as Mika Feldman de Etchebéhère), setting up shooting ranges and target practice classes and promoting their stories through the magazine.

=== Health and social care ===
Mujeres Libres also supported the war effort by setting up a school to train nurses, and creating an emergency medical clinic to support those who were injured in the war. One of the initiators, Dr Amparo Poch y Gascón, was a doctor herself, and used her expertise to teach advanced first aid and trained women as midwives.

==== Women's health ====
In Barcelona, they ran a lying-in hospital, which provided birth and post-natal care for mothers, and offered education for all women regarding child and maternal health, sexuality, and eugenics, even running a campaign to encourage breastfeeding. This was later bolstered by their February 1938 founding of the Louise Michel Institute of Maternal and Child Care, named after the French anarchist, and offering extensive medical services and counselling for mothers and children. During the war, Mujeres Libres was supported by the anarchist government minister Federica Montseny in their efforts to disseminate information regarding birth control, and they supported her legalisation of abortion.

==== Childcare ====
Mujeres Libres supported group childcare, and set up childcare centres in both industrial and agricultural workplaces. As women were the primary carers of children, this service allowed women to more freely participate in the workforce and union activities. Therefore, their efforts to improve the health and education of children also supported both the war effort and their aims of female emancipation.

=== Education ===
Another core focus of Mujeres Libres was on education. Intent on dealing with illiteracy, they set up a school to teach working-class women to read and transition into the workforce. Their objectives with their education programmes ranged from simple literacy and elementary education to technical and professional schools, even offering training in highly specialised topics such as advanced viticulture.

They also encouraged 'social formation' through education, teaching women methods of union organisation, sociology, economics, and cultural studies. This was supported by general courses in other areas that Mujeres Libres focused on, such as nursing and childcare. Direct educational programs such as these reached thousands of women throughout the civil war, and between 600 and 800 women were attending classes every day at one school in Barcelona.

== Opposition ==
=== Within the anarchist movement ===
Following Proudhon's patriarchal views, some anarchist opponents of the movement towards women's rights in Spain argued that a woman's proper role was to be a mother and to offer support to their activist husbands in the home, rather than to participate directly in the movement themselves. For instance, anarchist woman Matilde Piller wrote in 1934 that "one cannot be a good mother—in the strict sense of the term—and a good lawyer or chemist at the same time... Perhaps one can be an intellectual and a woman at the same time. But a mother? No." The women of Mujeres Libres were also often disrespectfully referred to as 'Mujeres Liebres'. This term, literally translated as 'women hares', implied that they 'hopped' from bed to bed—a clear attempt to sexually degrade members of the movement.

As the anarchist organisations were strong advocates of decentralization, policies on cooperation with Mujeres Libres varied between the local, regional, and national levels. Local groups tended to be more amenable towards collaboration, enabling Mujeres Libres to undertake many of its projects jointly with local unions. In contrast, at the regional and national levels, they found much more resistance. While they were granted funding to continue their operation, it was often much less than what was requested. The FIJL even set up a Women's Bureau within its own organisation, which competed with Mujeres Libres, despite their common position that women simply did not need a separate organisation.

One key reason for this hostility—and the eventual denial of equal status at the October 1938 national movement congress—was the insistence of Mujeres Libres on autonomy. Their independent goals (of empowering women, rather than just incorporating them into the movement) were seen as calling into question the capability of existing organisations. Mujeres Libres formed to address what they argued was the failure of the existing organisations to address the specific and unique situation of women. As continued autonomy would imply that the anarchist movement remained incapable of solving the issue, the accusation of separatism was commonly levied at Mujeres Libres—despite their constant affirmation that they sought no such end, and their belief that women's emancipation and anarchist revolution were intrinsically linked.

=== From other women's organisations ===
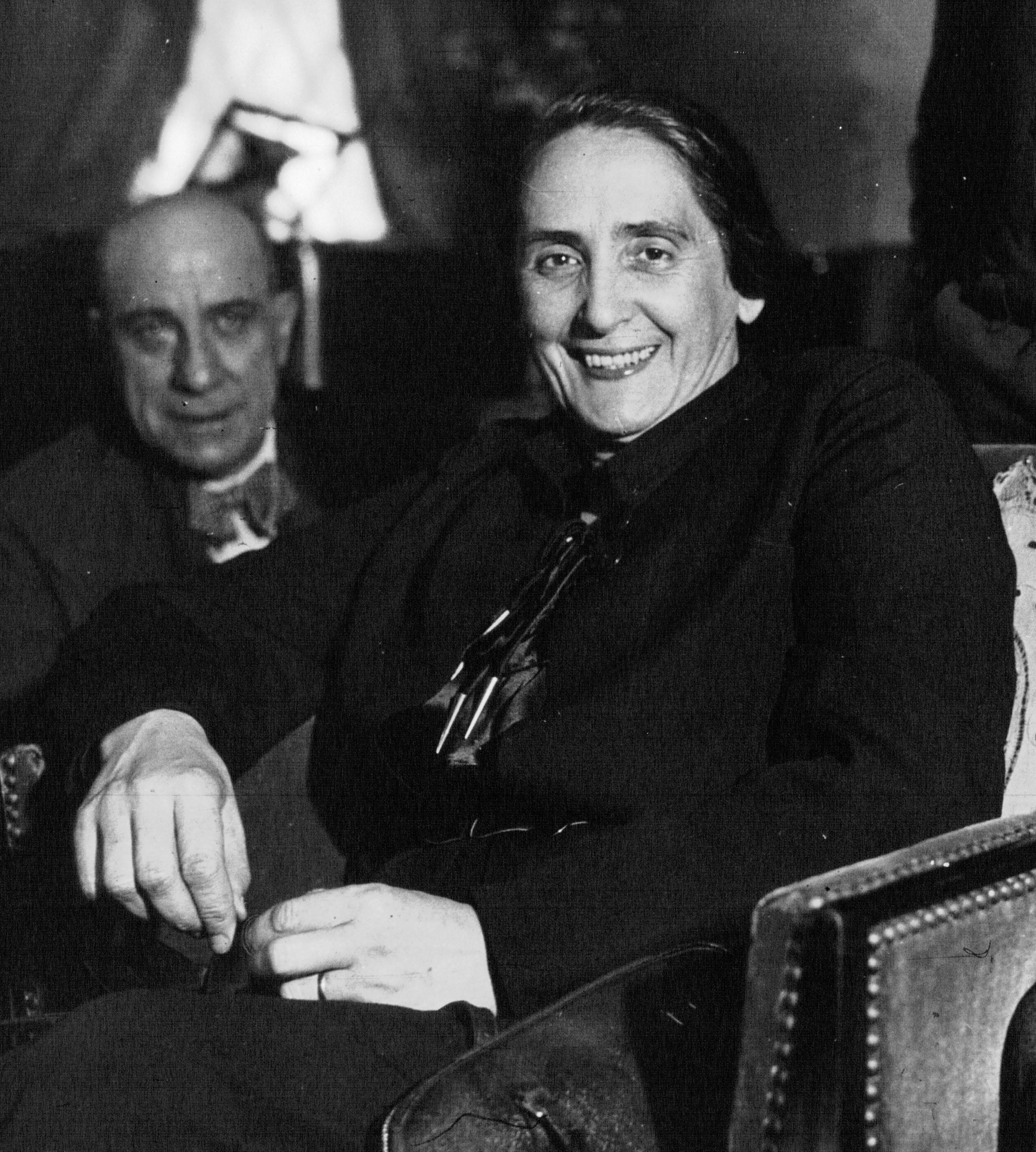
Dolores Ibárruri, female Communist figure and leader of the AMA, in 1936

Relations between Mujeres Libres and other women's groups were often tense. One reason for this was their rejection of feminism, due to their belief that women's activism should only take place alongside anarchist organising. This belief was of particularly great significance due to the political nature of many women's organisations. Several other political parties had set up women's organisations, particularly socialist and communist groups; even the fascist Falange had a Sección Femenina. Mujeres Libres effectively filled this role for the anarchist movement.

During the Civil War, within the Republic, ideological tensions between various factions were extremely prominent. As anarchists made strides towards revolution in the Spanish Revolution of 1936, Communist groups such as the PCE and PSUC moved to suppress the movement, arguing that defeating Franco was more immediately important than revolution. As this ideological tension grew, the competition between the respective women's groups developed a new dimension, with Mujeres Libres particularly competing for membership with the PCE-led Association of Antifascist Women (in Spanish, Asociación de Mujeres Antifascistas, AMA).

In the name of anti-fascist unity, the AMA called for the unification of women's groups into one organisation dedicated to mobilising women for the war effort. Dolores Ibárruri, a prominent female Communist figure and leader of the AMA, contested that women should be organised and encouraged into the workforce, but focused on the war effort rather than women's emancipation. Mujeres Libres rejected this call, not only due to their ideological opposition to the PCE, but also because they viewed wartime contribution as only one part of a broader programme of women's emancipation. In this way, Mujeres Libres was unique among contemporary women's organisations in that it considered women's emancipation an end in itself.

== End of the movement and legacy ==
Following the fall of Catalonia in February 1939, many Republican figures including Lucía Sánchez Saornil fled to France, and Mujeres Libres collapsed. The fourteenth issue of the Mujeres Libres magazine was still being printed when Barcelona fell, and no copies survived. Just two months later, the Spanish Republic fell to Franco's Nationalist forces, and the resultant Francoist dictatorship suppressed the anarchist movement.

Nevertheless, participation in the movement had an effect on its members. Historian Martha Ackelsberg noted that their experiences of "energy, enthusiasm, and sense of personal and collective empowerment" had a "dramatic and long-lasting impact" on women who had been members, even half a century after the Civil War.

=== In popular culture ===
The 1996 historical drama film Libertarias, directed by Vicente Aranda, is centred on members of Mujeres Libres.

== See also ==
- List of uprisings led by women

== Bibliography ==
- Martha Ackelsberg Mujeres Libres: El anarquismo y la lucha por la emancipación de las mujeres. VIRUS editorial. Barcelona, 2006. ISBN 84-88455-66-6. ISBN 978-84-88455-66-6
- Mujeres Libres: España 1936-1939. Selección y prólogo de Mary Nash. Tusquets. Barcelona, 1976. ISBN 84-7223-704-4
- Jornadas 80 aniversario de la Federación Nacional de Mujeres Libres Madrid, 2018 ISBN 9788409040339
- Giner, Elisenda; Ruiz, Laura; Serrano, Mª Ángeles; Valls, Rosa (April 2016). "Free Women's Contributions to Working-Class Women's Sexual Education During the Spanish Civil War (1936–1939) and Beyond". Teachers College Record. 118 (4): 1–38. doi:10.1177/016146811611800401. S2CID 148385990.
- Free Women (Mujeres Libres). Voices and Memories for a Libertarian Future. Laura Ruiz. Sense Publishers. Rotterdam/Boston/Taipei, 2011. ISBN Paperback: 9789460910876 ISBN Hardcover: 9789460910883 ISBN E-Book: 9789460915192.
