= Agrupación Cultural Femenina =

Venezuelan women's rights organization

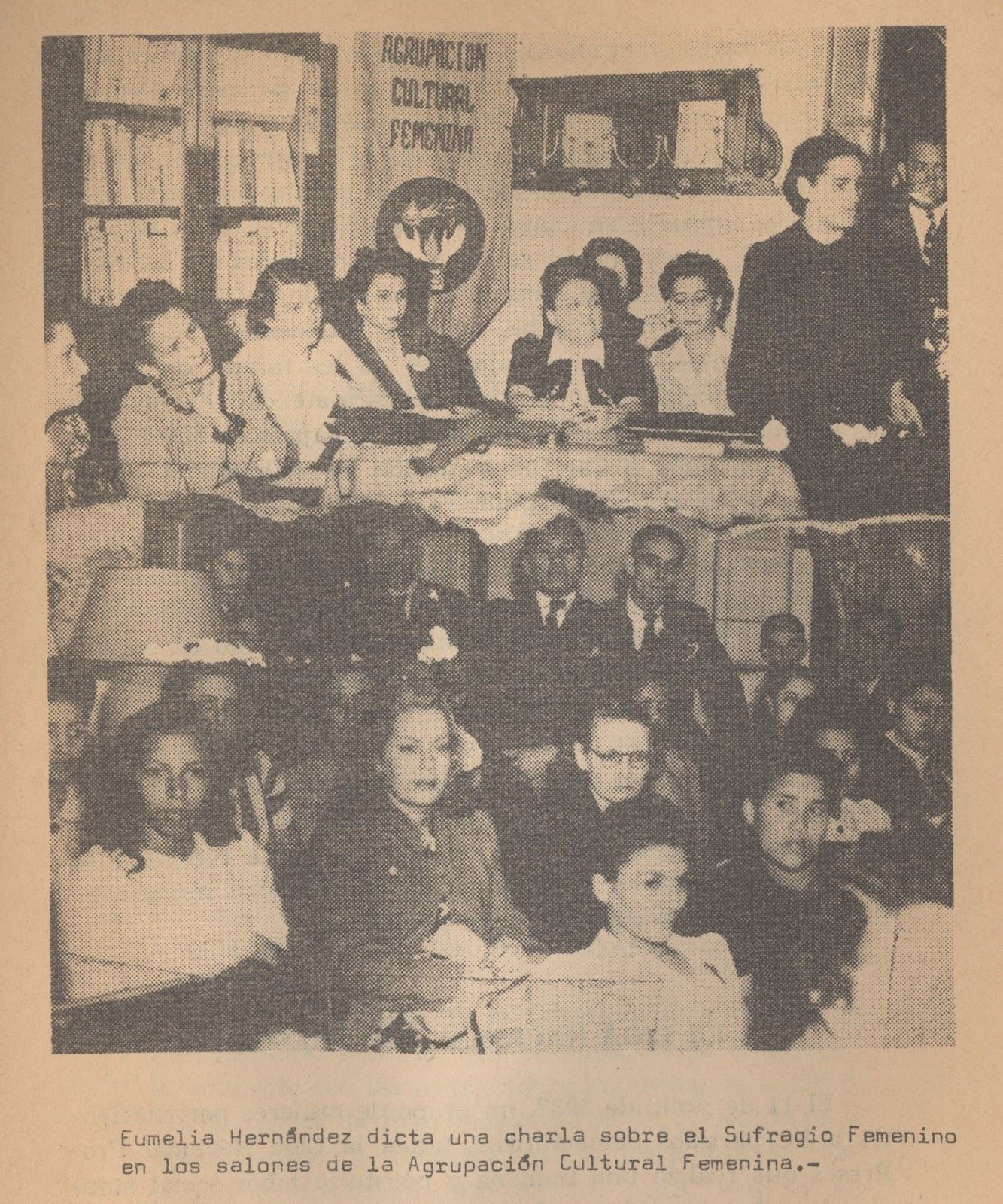
Agrupación Cultural Femenina

Agrupación Cultural Femenina (ACF) was a Venezuelan women's rights organization founded in 1935. It was the first and the most influential women's organization in Venezuela.

== Life ==
The Venezuelan women's movement developed late and did not organize until the ACF was formed. The ACF was founded on 15 October 1935 by Cecilia Nuñez Sucre, a member of the student movement of 1928. Its members, called acefistas, consisted largely of educated women middle class teachers.

The ACF focused partially on general women's issues, and partially on social work toward women workers. It lobbied the congress and spoke for reforms in women's rights to education, health care, right to work and maternal care. It lobbied the congress to enforce the 1936 Labor Law, to reform the Civil Code, and to introduce women's suffrage. In 1940, the ACF hosted the national women's congress.

It published the women's magazine Cultura de la Mujer (Women's Culture).

Women's suffrage was introduced in 1946. The reform was introduced in 1945 and implemented in 1947 by the government of Rómulo Betancourt.

The ACF, being the first women's organisation in Venezuela, came to be regarded as a model for later women's organisations.
