= Peggy Kornegger =

American writer

- Born: Illinois, United States
- Education: University of Massachusetts Boston
- Occupation: Editor ⋅ Author ⋅ Writer
- Years active: 1970s-present
- Website: https://spirit-flower.com/

Peggy Kornegger is an American writer and editor born in rural Illinois. In the 1970s she identified herself as an anarcha-feminist, and was an editor of the American feminist magazine The Second Wave. Her article "Anarchism: The Feminist Connection" (1975) was reprinted as a booklet in New York City and London in 1977, translated into Italian for a journal in Italy, and included in the book Reinventing Anarchy in 1979. Her book Living with Spirit, Journey of a Flower Child was published in 2009.

== Personal life ==
Kornegger grew up in rural Illinois before moving to California.

Kornegger attended San Diego State University and attained a Bachelor of Arts in Psychology. She would attain a Master of Arts in Women's literature in the Goddard-Cambridge Graduate School at the University of Massachusetts Boston, and attend Kalamazoo College.

She edited textbooks at The Ligature, Houghton Mifflin Harcourt and Baseline from 1992 to 2009.

Later in life, she began writing about her struggles with overcoming breast cancer, her spiritual journey and personal growth. She is currently based out of Boston. Kornegger has written biweekly articles on her blog Spiritflower since 2012.

== Work ==
Before writing her books, Kornegger submitted poems and at least one essay to feminist magazine Off Our Backs as early as 1975 and as late as 1997.

All four of Kornegger's books include artwork from Anne Katzeff, a Boston-based artist and graphic designer.

Kornegger has been interviewed on Vivid Life Radio, The Spiritual Help Desk and Lasting Conversations. She frequently shares her work in Spirit of Change, a New England based holistic magazine.

== Bibliography ==
- Anarchism: The Feminist Connection (1975) ISBN 9780968950388
- Living with Spirit, Journey of a Flower Child (2009) ISBN 9781608440580
- Lose Your Mind, Open Your Heart (2014) ISBN 9781457533495
- Inside The Rainbow (2021) ISBN 979-8494398529
- Breast Cancer and Beyond: An Unexpected Soul Path (2024) ISBN 979-8325177811
