= Francesco Tava =

Italian philosopher

Education
- Education: San Raffaele University (BA, MA), SUM Italian Institute of Human Sciences (PhD)

Philosophical work
- Era: 21st-century philosophy
- Region: Western philosophy
- Institutions: University of the West of England, KU Leuven
- Main interests: phenomenology

Francesco Tava is an Italian philosopher and associate professor of philosophy at the University of the West of England. He is a Co-Editor-in-Chief of Future Humanities. Tava is known for his works on phenomenology.

== Books ==
- The Risk of Freedom: Ethics, Phenomenology, and Politics in Jan Patočka, Rowman & Littlefield International, 2015
- Thinking after Europe (ed.), Rowman & Littlefield International 2016
- Phenomenology and the Idea of Europe (ed.), Routledge 2017
- European Solidarity: Interdisciplinary Perspectives (ed.), (forthcoming 2023)
