= Chiara Bottici =

Italian feminist philosopher

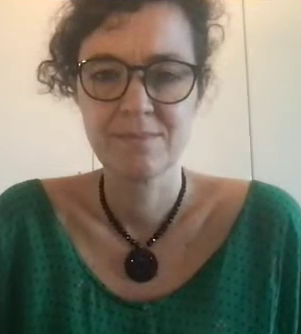
- Chiara Bottici
- Born: January 24, 1975 (age 51)

Philosophical work
- Institutions: The New School
- Main interests: Political philosophy, aesthetics, gender studies, psychoanalysis

Chiara Bottici (born 24 January 1975) is an Italian philosopher, critical theorist and historian of philosophy.

== Biography ==
Bottici is Professor of Philosophy and Director of Gender Studies at The New School for Social Research and Eugene Lang College, New York. Bottici studied philosophy at the University of Florence, then obtained a PhD from the European University Institute in 2004. After a post-doctorate at the SUM (Istituto Italiano di Science Umane) under the guidance of Roberto Esposito, she taught at the University of Frankfurt, subsequently joining the faculty of The New School for Social Research, where she taught from 2010 to 2025.

Bottici is known for her work on how images and imagination affect politics and her feminist experimental writings. Her work has explored the role that images and imagination play in politics. She is the author of a variety of texts, most recently A Feminist Mythology (Bloomsbury Academic 2022) and Anarchafeminism (Bloomsbury Academic 2021). With Jacob Blumenfeld and Simon Critchley, she also edited The Anarchist Turn (Pluto Press, 2013).

== Major works ==
Bottici's philosophical work is devoted to exploring the politics of imagination in its different aspects, from a general theory about the role of images in politics to more specific inquiries into sexism, heteronormativity, ethnonationalism, Eurocentrism, Islamophobia, racism, and the coloniality of power.

=== Political analogies and metaphors ===
Bottici's work examined the history and function of the metaphor of the state as a person within modern European political philosophy and reflected on its fate in the contemporary epoch, a time in which challenges to the traditional notion of state sovereignty question the idea of clear-cut boundaries, and therefore the possibility of drawing any analogy between states and individuals. Bottici's first book, Men and States: Rethinking the Domestic Analogy in the Global Age (Italian edition ETS 2004, Eng. trans. Palgrave 2009) offered a systematic reconstruction of the role that the analogy between states and individuals has played in European modern political philosophy and in contemporary theories of globalization, where the modern sovereign state is often taken as the culminating point of political life and where the gendered dimension of political thinking is emphasized.

=== Political myth ===
One of Bottici's specific contributions to social philosophy and critical theory is her philosophy of political myth developed in her work A Philosophy of Political Myth. By offering a critique in the form of a genealogy, following Nietzsche's Genealogy of Morals, Bottici provides a critical philosophical framework for the concept of political myth, explaining why political myths are a crucial ingredient of modern politics. Drawing from Hans Blumenberg's concept of Work on Myth (Arbeit am Mythos), Bottici shows myths are not objects given once and for all, but rather processes, in which their reception is an integral part of their elaboration.

Duncan Kelly states that Bottici's philosophy of political myth provides a framework within which the study of myth can be usefully deployed "and in this she has performed a useful work of Lockean philosophical underlaboring."

In 2006, Bottici started to apply her philosophy of political myth to specific case studies, collaborating with sociologist Benoît Challand. The Myth of the Clash of Civilizations follows the interdisciplinary spirit of the early Frankfurt school by combining philosophy, psychoanalysis, and empirical research to examine the roots of Islamophobia in contemporary societies, particularly in the post 9/11 Western world. Bottici and Challand argue that the image of a clash between Islam and the West is a political myth because it is a self-fulfilling prophecy nourished by centuries of Orientalism, Occidentalism, and identity politics as rooted in the history of European colonialism.

In Imagining Europe: Myth, Memory and Identity, Bottici and Challand applied their critique of ethnocentrism to Europe itself. For Bottici and Challand, the concept of Europe relies on a specific politics of imagination where mythical and historical narratives are most often intermingled. Examples include the idea that Europe was born out of the Greek Civilization, the belief in an intrinsically Christian Europe, and finally, the concept of Europe as the cradle of modernity. They argue that among Europe's founding myths, the most powerful ones are those that rely on geopolitical maps and other artefacts of the imagination, such as the division between Eastern and Western Europe or the idea of a fortress Europe.

=== Imaginal politics ===
Bottici's early work––as well as her multidisciplinary engagement with art and psychoanalysis––culminated in Imaginal Politics, a genealogical reconstruction of the concept of imagination in European history and a systematic reflection on the link between politics and our capacity to imagine. Whereas most philosophical theories focus on imagination understood as an individual faculty that we possess or on the social imaginary understood as the social background in which we live, Bottici proposes the concept of the imaginal as an "in-between" third alternative. The imaginal, defined as the space made of images, of representations that are also presences in themselves, acts both as the result of an individual faculty as well as the product of the social context. In contrast to the term "imaginary," which maintains its connotation of unreality or alienation, as in Jacques Lacan's psychoanalytic theory, the "imaginal" does not make any ontological assumption as to the status of images, and is therefore a more malleable tool for thinking about images in an age of virtuality.

Political theorist John Grant compared Bottici's approach to the social imaginary to that of Charles Taylor and Michael Warner, arguing that, although her work is an improvement on Taylor's understanding of the social imaginary as a mere "background," Bottici fails through her dismissal of ideology in its negative form, resulting in "an abandonment of the very dialectical mode that could have reinvigorated her work." However, writer and media scholar McKenzie Wark emphasized that Bottici's philosophy of the imaginal opens the space for thinking about what precedes the division between real and unreal as well as that between the individual and the social, and, as such, it is a welcome contribution to thinking about the destiny of images in a time when the technological transformations of capitalism have tightened the link between politics and the images to such a degree that "they are no longer what mediates our doing politics but rather what risks doing politics in our stead."

Bottici's account on imaginal politics is critically examined in the collection, Debating Imaginal Politics: Dialogues with Chiara Bottici (Rowman & Littlefield Publishers 2021).

=== Transindividuality ===
Bottici's work on the imaginal, as this third alternative between the individual and the social reflects her efforts to move towards a new social ontology. In a 2017 interview, Bottici states that "to understand the present, we have to understand how we actually got here, which other roads we missed on the way, and thus, also, possibly whether we can get off this path," explaining her work as animated by the question, "where is the new coming from?" Drawing from her work on Baruch Spinoza and on Etienne Balibar's reading of Spinoza's Ethics, Bottici embraced the concept of the transindividual, contributing to the development of a philosophy of transindividuality. In a 2017 seminar on mass psychology and Trumpism with Judith Butler, Bottici emphasized the ongoing production and receipt of the political image as a mode of the ongoing production and receipt of the political self.

=== Anarcha-feminism ===
The philosophy of transindividuality, according to which individuals must be understood not as objects, but as continuous and contingent processes of association that happen at the inter-, infra-, and supra-individual level, is central to Bottici's feminist writings. Her recent work in this area elaborates a contemporary theory of anarcha-feminism, which argues against a one single principle (or arché) that explains gender oppression, and emphasizes ongoing interrogations of specific intersections of class, race, empire, sexuality, hetero- and cis- normativity. Bottici connects intersectional feminism and the anarcho-feminism of the past to argue that "another woman is possible." As Bottici argues, "bodies are plural and plural is their oppression," therefore anarcha-feminism is a philosophic methodology for going beyond gendered racial and social division and "thus also, in a way, beyond feminism itself."

Bottici's editorial work and writing for The New School's Public Seminar, an online forum dedicated to creating a global intellectual commons, and her multiple performances in the global Night of Philosophy project, founded by philosopher and curator Mériam Korichi, reflect Bottici's engagement with philosophy as a critical practice as well as a practice of critique.

=== Feminist experimental writings ===
Along with her academic and philosophical work, Bottici is also known for her creative writing, particularly her feminist experimental writings. Whereas Bottici's academic work provides a philosophy of the imaginal, her experimental writings put forward an imaginal philosophy, that is, a form of polystylism where literary images convey philosophical ideas.

An important part of her work in this area was devoted to retelling the myths of femininity from the point of view of contemporary time, transforming figures of the old patriarchal mythology, such as Sheherazade, Ariadne, and Europa, into feminist symbols. Bottici's retelling of the myth of the "city of women" recalls Monique Wittig's Les guerrilieres, as well as other works in the écriture féminine tradition. Writer and critic Gabriele Pedulla described Bottici's reappropriation of the myths of femininity as a "magic that breaks the order," a magic that reminds us of the work of Massimo Bontempelli, the Italian theorist of magic realism and inspirer of Italo Calvino, but also the "euphoric rupture" of surrealist literature.

Bottici's creative practice has extended to Anglophone poetry and the art of the libretto, including her collaboration with composer and multimedia artist Jean-Baptiste Barriere. A preview of the opera, titled "The Art of Change," was performed in 2019 at The Festival of the New.
