= Anarcha-feminism =

Branch of anarchism that puts a particular emphasis on feminism

Anarcha-feminism, also known as anarchist feminism or anarcho-feminism, is a system of analysis which combines the principles and power analysis of anarchist theory with feminism. It closely resembles intersectional feminism. Anarcha-feminism generally posits that patriarchy and traditional gender roles as manifestations of involuntary coercive hierarchy should be replaced by decentralized free association. Anarcha-feminists believe that the struggle against patriarchy is an essential part of class conflict and the anarchist struggle against the state and capitalism. In essence, the philosophy sees anarchist struggle as a necessary component of feminist struggle and vice versa. Canadian anarcha-feminist writer L. Susan Brown claims that "as anarchism is a political philosophy that opposes all relationships of power, it is inherently feminist".

== History ==
=== Background ===
Anarchism first emerged as a political current at a time when gender inequality was systematically enforced and women were excluded from public life. Their existence was confined to the traditional gender roles of mothers and wives, within the construct of the nuclear family. In particular, working-class women were both politically and economically disenfranchised, which drove them closer to socialism and political militancy. They began to agitate for reproductive rights and free love, which formed the basis for an anarchist feminism.

The earliest proponents of anarchism were initially reluctant to approach the subject of feminism: Pierre-Joseph Proudhon was openly hostile to feminist demands of gender equality and upheld traditional family values; Peter Kropotkin thought that feminist goals should be subordinated to the class struggle; and Benjamin Tucker opposed the demand of "equal pay for equal work". It was only after Mikhail Bakunin made the abolition of gender inequality one of the aims of the International Alliance of Socialist Democracy that women's rights became a primary concern for the anarchist movement. Anarcho-communists adopted Friedrich Engels' critique of the family, which held it to be the origin of both gender inequality and economic inequality. This anti-authoritarian critique of power within the institutions of marriage and the nuclear family began to attract many feminists towards anarchism. The subsequent synthesis of anarchism and feminism, although not explicitly labelled as such at the time, later came to be known as anarcha-feminism.

=== First wave (1880s–1940s) ===
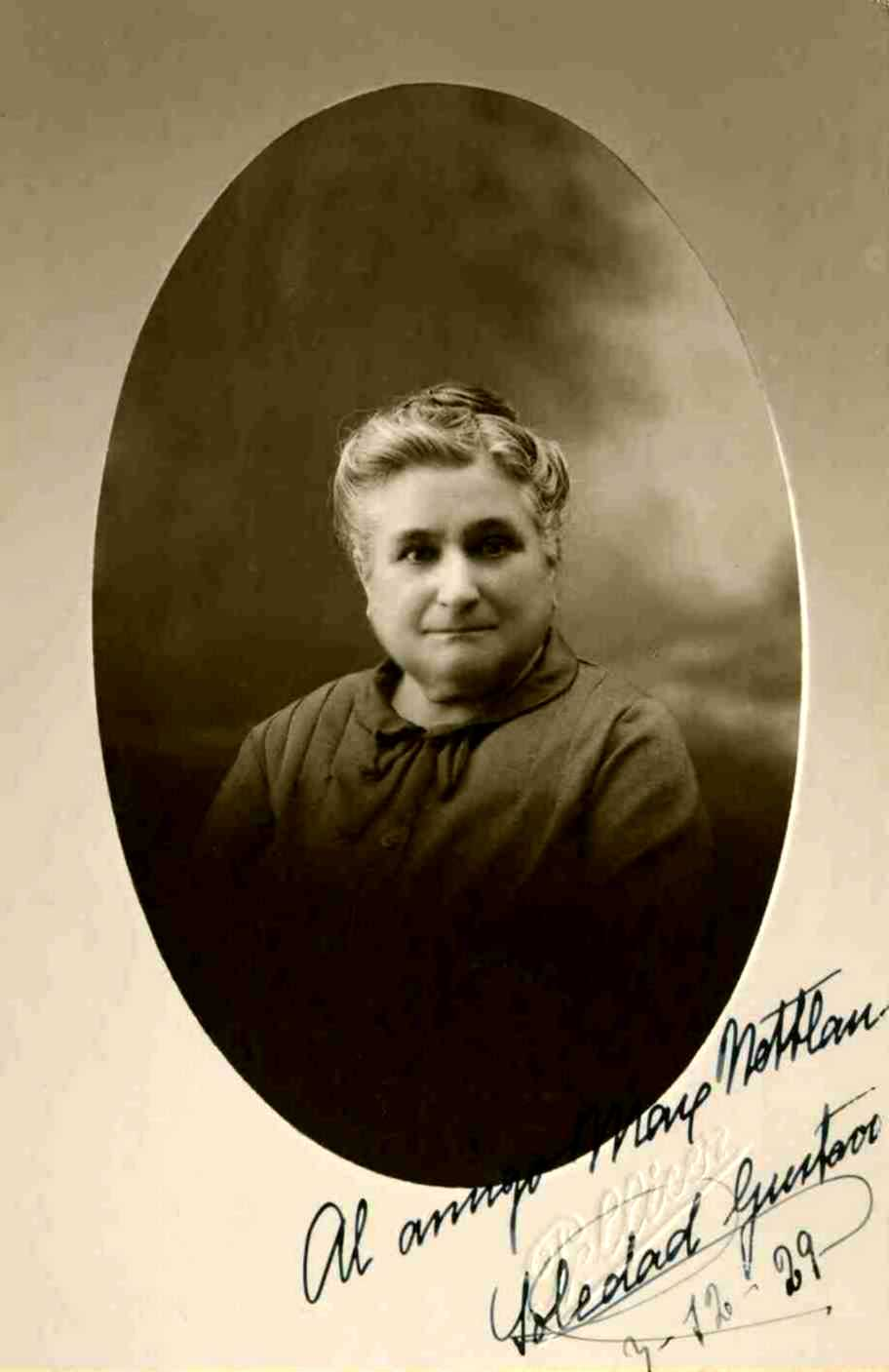
Teresa Mañé, one of the first proponents of the anarcha-feminist synthesis

During the 1880s, a current of anarchist feminism was first developed by the Catalan activists Teresa Mañé and Teresa Claramunt. By the 1890s, anarchist feminism had spread across the globe, brought by immigrants to and from Europe. The anarchist press started to publish feminist analyses on gender equality and critiques of marriage, the nuclear family and prostitution. Through Errico Malatesta's La Questione Sociale, Teresa Mañé's pamphlets on female education and gender inequality received widespread publication. Anarchist feminism was further taken up by the American anarchists Voltairine de Cleyre and Emma Goldman, the latter of whom came to be considered a "founding mother" of anarcha-feminism. Lucy Parsons also established the Working Women's Union in Chicago and ensured women's participation in the Industrial Workers of the World as one of its founding members. In England, the anarchist Charlotte Wilson became an advocate for "equal pay for equal work" and promoted women's education.

Anarchist women took prominent positions within the editorial boards of magazines (such as Mother Earth), in the publication of books, and as public speakers. Specifically feminist publications were also circulated, including Germinal, El Oprimido and La Voz de la Mujer, in which anarchist women defended a revolutionary form of feminism. As a way to counter the Culture of Domesticity, which upheld the private property of the nuclear family, anarchist women like Charlotte Wilson opened their homes into "quasi-public spaces" for political meetings and communal meals. Anarchist women even took part in violent direct actions, including Vera Zasulich's attempted assassination of the Russian police chief Fyodor Trepov; Germaine Berton's murder of the French far-right politician Marius Plateau; and Kanno Sugako's plot to assassinate the Japanese Emperor Meiji.

The rise of anarchist feminism provoked an anti-feminist reaction among many of the men of the anarchist movement, who deemphasised the struggle for women's rights as secondary to the class struggle. In turn, La Voz de la Mujer denounced these men as "false anarchists" who prioritised their own liberation over that of women. In the Chinese anarcha-feminist journal Natural Justice, He Zhen also criticised what she saw as "men's pursuit of self distinction in the name of women's liberation". Anarcha-feminists generally concluded that male hostility to feminism proved them unreliable to the cause for women's rights, and began to organise their own movement to address their own needs.

First-wave feminists established women's groups as flat organizations that used consensus decision-making, reflecting an "unconscious libertarian consciousness". Anarchist women's groups were established throughout the United States, largely by Italian immigrant women, with the goal of pursuing "women's emancipation" through mutual aid and self-organization. In Paterson, New Jersey, the Gruppo Emancipazione della Donna formed women's theater and music clubs, and publicised works of anarchist feminism that linked the struggle against the patriarchy with the struggle against the patria. In contrast to the Italian anarchists, Jewish anarchists rarely formed specific women's groups, with anarchists of the journal Fraye Arbeter Shtime declaring themselves to all be feminists.

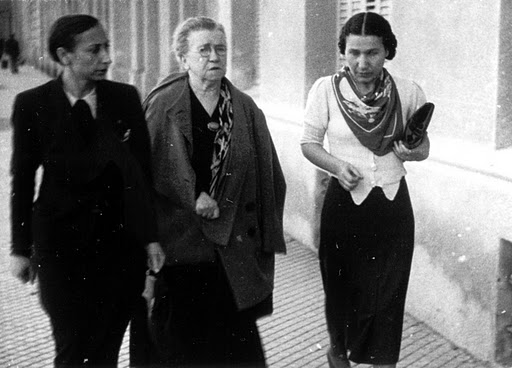
Lucía Sánchez Saornil meeting with Emma Goldman, during the latter's visit to the Spanish Republic in 1938

One of the most notable libertarian women's groups was the Mujeres Libres, an anarchist feminist organisation that aimed for women's liberation from their "triple enslavement" by ignorance, exploitation and discrimination. Founded during the Spanish Revolution of 1936 by Lucía Sánchez Saornil, Mercè Comaposada and Amparo Poch y Gascón, the Mujeres Libres implemented programmes of women's education that taught women technical skills and increased female literacy. Sánchez Saornil herself wrote poetry that called for women to take action against their oppression, which attracted Emma Goldman to visit Spain and participate in the work of the Mujeres Libres as an advocate.

But the anarchist feminism of the time, focused more on developing small activist groups than creating a mass movement, lacked a precise strategy for achieving women's rights, so little action in that way was taken. During the early 20th century, anarchist feminism was progressively supplanted by socialist feminism, which took a reformist approach towards achieving women's suffrage. By this time Charlotte Wilson had herself abandoned anarchist activism, becoming involved in women's suffrage advocacy and later joining the Independent Labour Party. Anarchist feminist critiques of the family and authoritarianism went into remission, only to be reformulated when a new wave of feminism emerged.

=== Second wave (1960s–1980s) ===
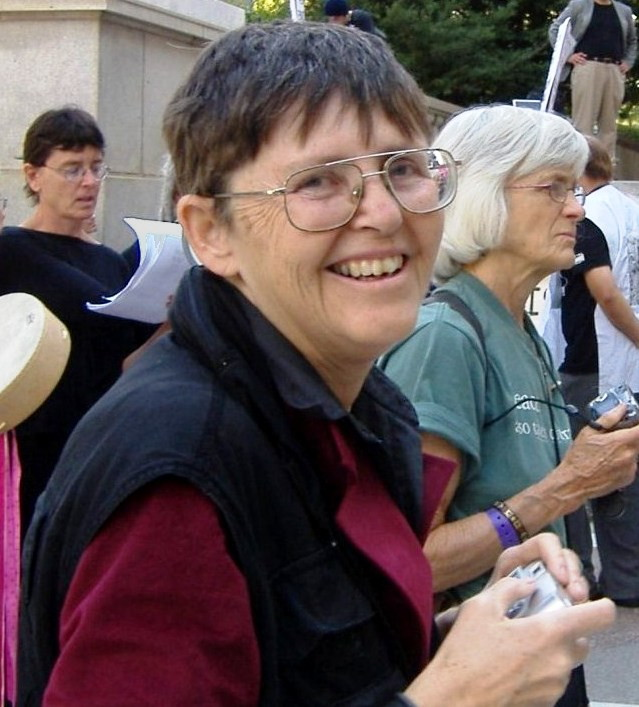
Jo Freeman, whose 1972 essay The Tyranny of Structurelessness held a large influence during second-wave of anarcha-feminism

By the late 1960s, second-wave feminism had emerged from the New Left, as part of a broad wave of anti-oppression activism that included the civil rights movement and culminated with the protests of 1968. Drawing from socialist feminism, this second-wave sought to encourage solidarity between women, bringing them together into a "sisterhood" based on their shared experiences. During this period, feminists rediscovered the work of first-wave anarchist feminists like Emma Goldman and before long the women's liberation movement began to reshape the anarchist movement. Many second-wave feminists came to consider anarchism to be the "logically consistent expression of feminism", due to its synthesis of the struggle for individual liberty with that for social equality. Peggy Kornegger claimed that feminists had already been "unconscious anarchists in both theory and practice" and were the only activist tendency to be "practic[ing] what anarchism preaches".

The pervasive environment of sexism within many sections of the New Left gave an impulse to the establishment of women's groups as part of a strategy of feminist separatism, which led to the coining and adoption of the term "anarcha-feminist" by anarchist women. Second-wave anarchist feminists developed their own affinity groups according to cooperative, decentralist and federalist principles, as an alternative to both patriarchal and structureless organisations. The anarcha-feminist drive to reckon with these hierarchical forms of organisation was particularly influenced by Jo Freeman's 1972 essay The Tyranny of Structurelessness, which encouraged an organized egalitarian tendency within the movement.

The second wave of anarchist feminism was also characterised by an often violent militancy, as displayed in the SCUM Manifesto. Anarcha-feminists such as Ann Hansen participated in the bombing attacks by the urban guerrilla group Direct Action, which targeted companies that produced parts for weapons of war and a chain video store that was distributing snuff films and paedophilic pornography.

By the 1980s, the feminist sex wars had caused a divide within second-wave feminism, which fragmented into multiple different tendencies, while many former feminists moved into academic careerism.

=== Third wave (1990s–2000s) ===
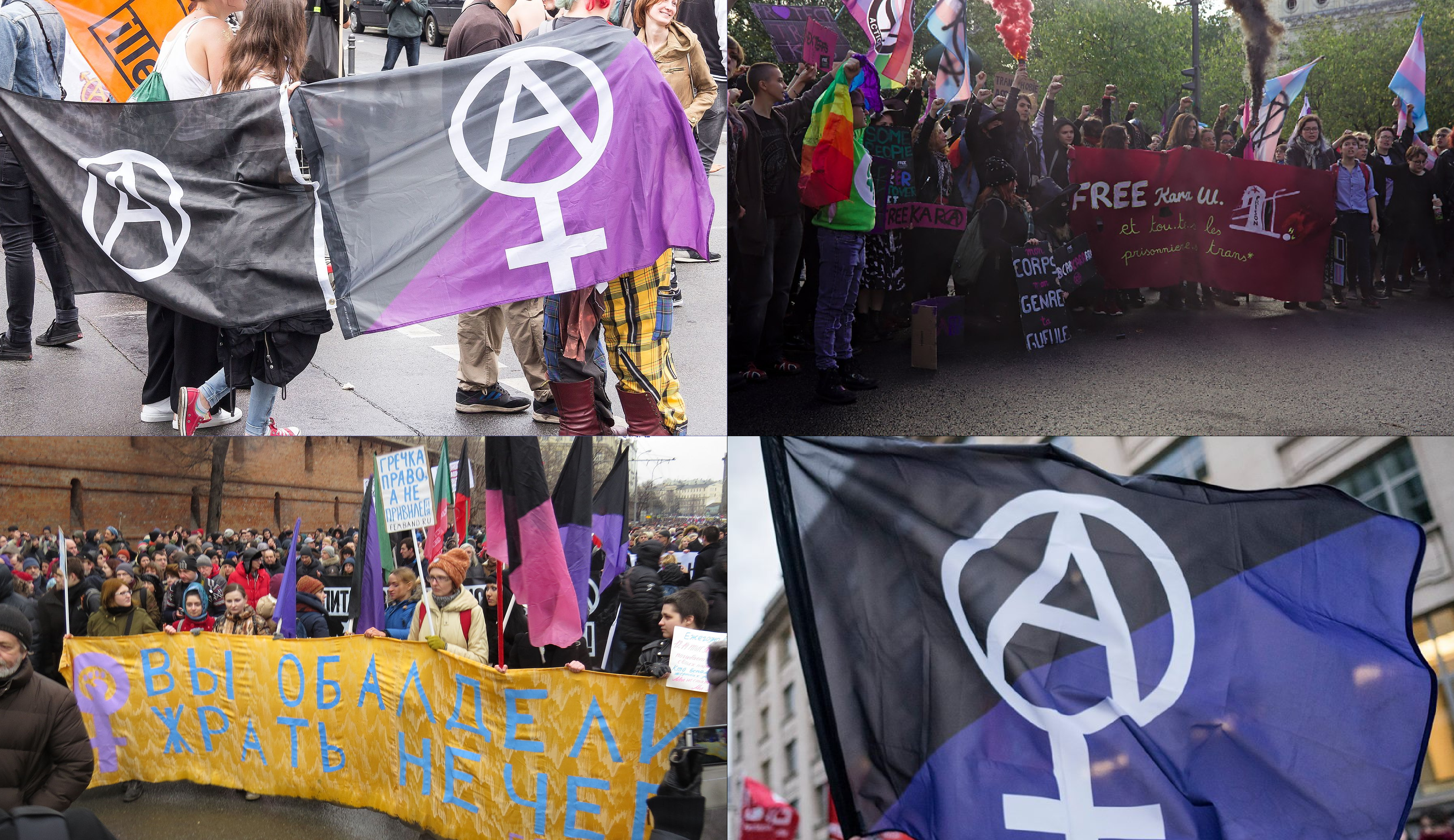
Collection of anarcha-feminist protests

The beginnings of the anti-globalization movement spurred the development of a new wave, with reflections on the earlier second-wave and the influence of postcolonial feminism leading to an integration of identity politics into the framework of anarchist feminism. The emergence of a third-wave of anarcha-feminism brought with it a new focus on intersectionality, as anarcha-feminists came together to address the intersecting issues of poverty, racism and reproductive rights, among many others. The early feminist conception of a "New Woman" also formed part of the foundation for third-wave anarcha-feminism, which encouraged women to practice equality rather than to demand it. In Bolivia, the Mujeres Creando carried out direct actions that challenged poverty and traditional gender roles. In the United States, anarcha-feminists within the anarcho-punk scene spurred the development of the Riot grrrl subculture.

With the turn of the 21st century, there was a concerted effort to rethink approaches to anarcha-feminist histories, placing value in collective, open and non-hierarchical methods of gathering and exchanging knowledge. Collective research projects were carried out by groups such as the Dark Star Collective, which in 2002 published an anthology of anarcha-feminist works titled Quiet Rumours. In 2010, the feminist historian Judy Greenway elaborated five different methodologies of anarcha-feminist historiography:

1. The "additive approach", which incorporates elements otherwise overlooked in existing historiography;
2. The "Emma Goldman Short-Circuit", which centres the contributions of Emma Goldman above all others;
3. The "women's issues approach", which is chiefly concerned with issues of sexuality and reproductive rights;
4. The "inclusive approach", which focuses on the role of women in famous historical events;
5. The "transformative approach", which takes a critical look at the erasure of women and privileged position of men in gendered histories.

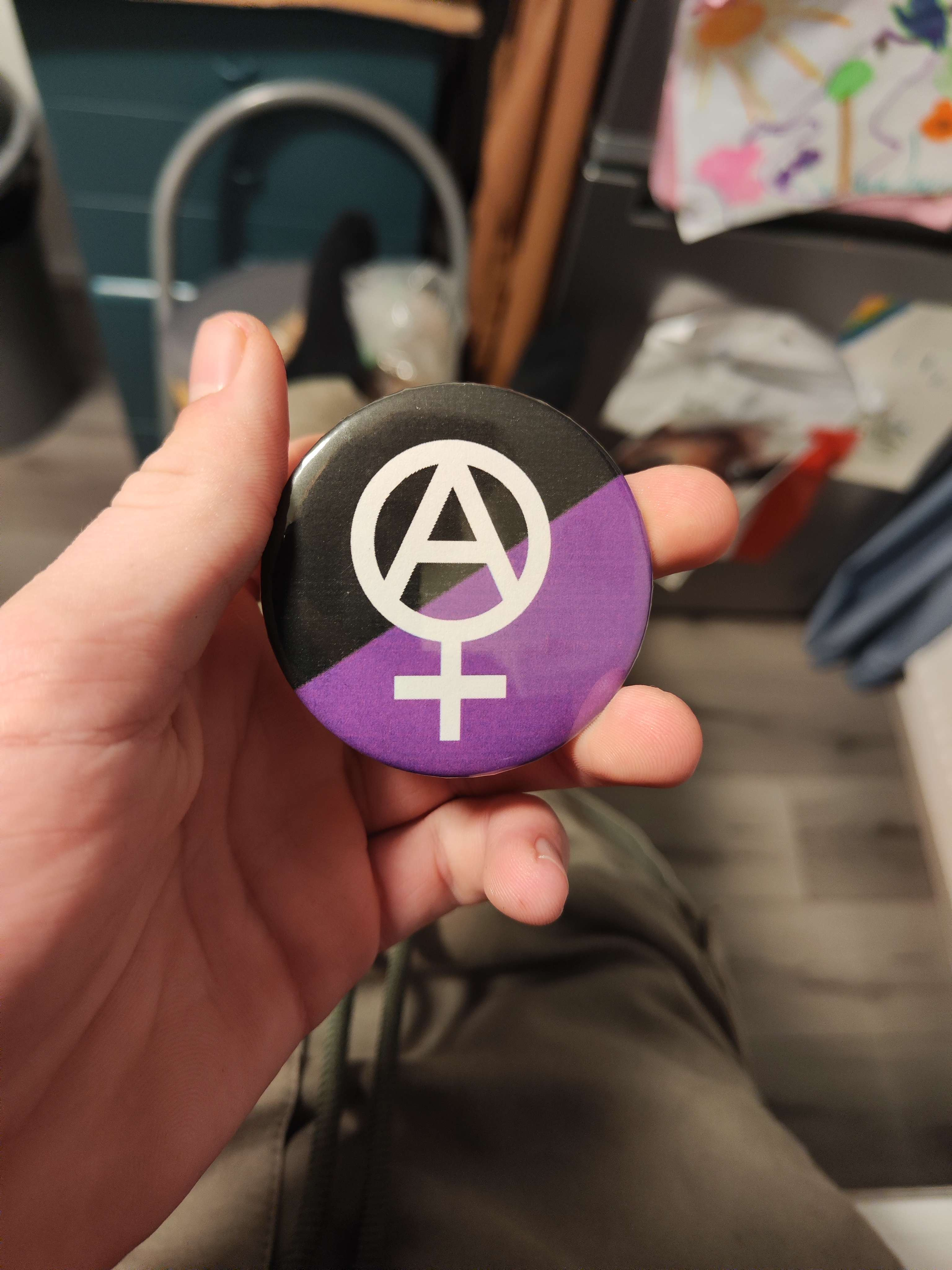
An anarchist pin using the circle A and the symbolism of anarcha-feminism (2025)

Greenway concluded that a complete anarcha-feminist historiography needed to actively challenge hierarchical biases within dominant historiographies, rather than merely reincorporating erased aspects of history or focusing excessively on one or two individuals.

=== Fourth wave (2012–present) ===
The fourth wave of feminism emerged through the development of postfeminism, taking concern with the objectification of women by market forces and characterised by its use of social networking. The fourth wave of anarchist feminism was particularly influenced by postmodern feminism.

In a 2017 article, Chiara Bottici argued that anarcha-feminism has been the subject of insufficient discussion in public debate and in academia, due in part to a broader hostility to anarchism but also due to difficulties in distinguishing between the tendency of anarcha-feminism and the broader philosophy of anarchism. Bottici argued that the risk of economic reductionism that appears in Marxist feminism, in which women's oppression is understood solely in economic terms, "has ... always been alien to anarcha-feminism"; as such, she argues, anarchism is better suited than Marxism for an alliance with feminism.

== Theory ==
Anarcha-feminism has a diverse range of thought, but is generally characterised by the principles of women's autonomy, free love and intersectionality. Anarcha-feminists are committed to women's empowerment in social and political life, opposing capitalism and the state as key instruments of institutional discrimination against women.

=== Anti-authoritarianism ===
Flag of the Women Internationalists of the Chin Hills (WITCH), an International brigade consisting of female volunteers fighting in Myanmar.

Anarcha-feminism expanded on the traditional anarchist principles of anti-statism, anti-clericalism and anti-capitalism, demonstrating their role in institutional discrimination such as sexism, racism and homophobia. In her 1895 essay entitled Sex Slavery, Voltairine de Cleyre claimed that sexism was caused by the institutional authoritarianism upheld by the clergy and the state.

Anarcha-feminists see the patriarchy and the state as two expressions of the same system of oppression, and concluded that the destruction of all forms of patriarchy would necessarily include the abolition of the state. Emma Goldman herself took an intersectional analysis of the state which saw it as an instrument of sexual repression, and thus rejected the strategy of reformism. As such, the first-wave of anarchist feminists criticised calls for women's suffrage, considering them to be insufficient for achieving gender equality. He Zhen was skeptical of the limited gender equality achieved in western liberal democracies, which she described as "false freedom and sham equality", even criticising the women's suffrage movement and male feminists for espousing an "empty rhetoric of emancipation".

=== Free love ===
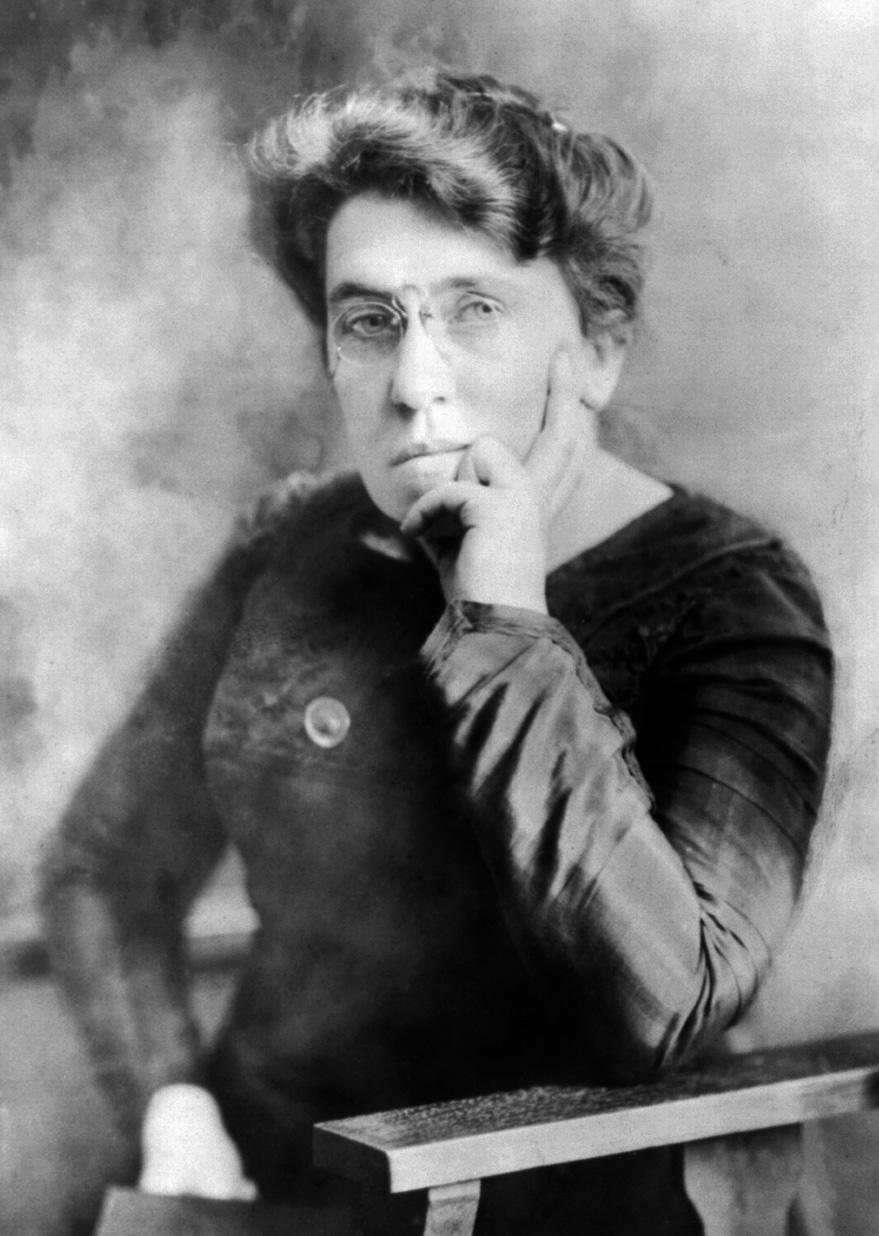
Emma Goldman, an early anarcha-feminist advocate and practitioner of free love

Anarchist feminists have developed a non-coercive approach to interpersonal relationships, which particularly upholds the value of consent. Anarchist feminists such as Voltairine de Cleyre and Emma Goldman fiercely criticised the institution of marriage, as they considered it to be inherently oppressive towards women due to its lack of consent.

Their critiques of marriage led them to advocate for and practice free love, which they held to be a remedy to women's social alienation. With its basis in freely-given consent, free love provided room for women to reconstruct their sexuality in a way that centered their own agency and autonomy. Emma Goldman herself saw sexuality as a "critical social force" of free expression, She extended this to a public defense of gay rights, which led to some scholars speculating about her own sexuality.

On the other hand, free love was opposed by Lucy Parsons, who criticised it as being inconsistent with anarchism and for its increased risks of pregnancy and sexually transmitted infections, instead arguing for a form of "monogamy without marriage".

=== Intersectionality ===
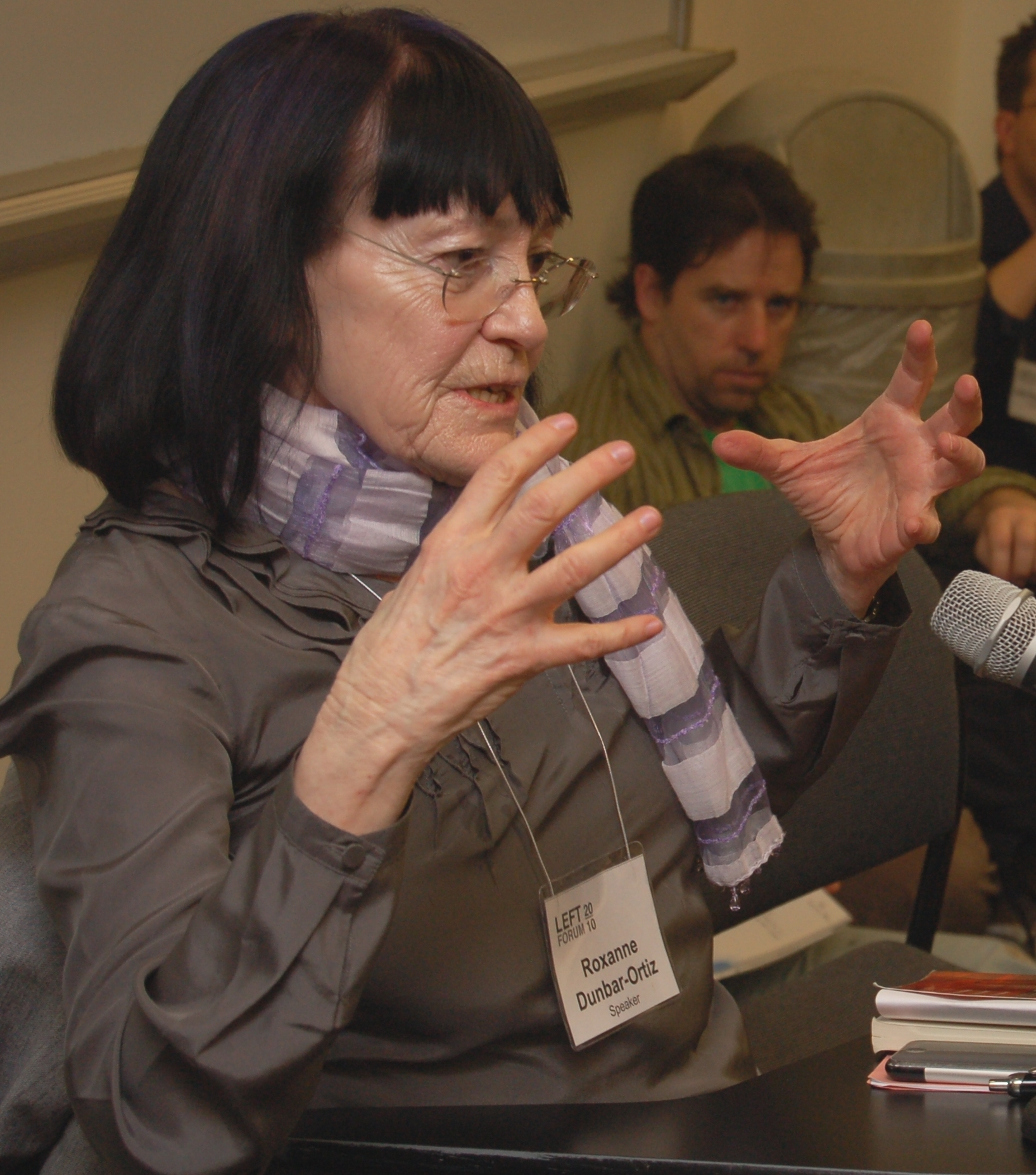
Roxanne Dunbar-Ortiz, one of the pioneers of intersectional anarcha-feminism during the 1970s

From the inception of anarcha-feminism as a current, anarchist feminists have engaged with other struggles that intersect with women's issues, participating in a number of different anti-racist and anti-colonial movements. A specifically anti-racist anarcha-feminism was pioneered during the 1970s by Roxanne Dunbar-Ortiz and her organization Cell 16.

In 1976, a statement produced by the Combahee River Collective lay the groundwork for the development of intersectionality. Since the third-wave, intersectionality has formed one of the core concepts of anarchist feminism, which has used it as a method to develop a feminist ethics of self-organization against all forms of oppression. Groups within the activist network No one is illegal (NOII) have since engaged in an anti-racist anarcha-feminism as part of their anti-border advocacy, which was itself rooted in an anti-statist critique of institutional sexism and racism within state immigration regimes.

Drawing from post-structuralism, postcolonialism and critical theory, Deric Shannon has proposed a contemporary construction of anarcha-feminism that engages with each of these theories, combining anti-capitalism with a comprehensive intersectional stance against all forms of oppression.

=== Individualism ===
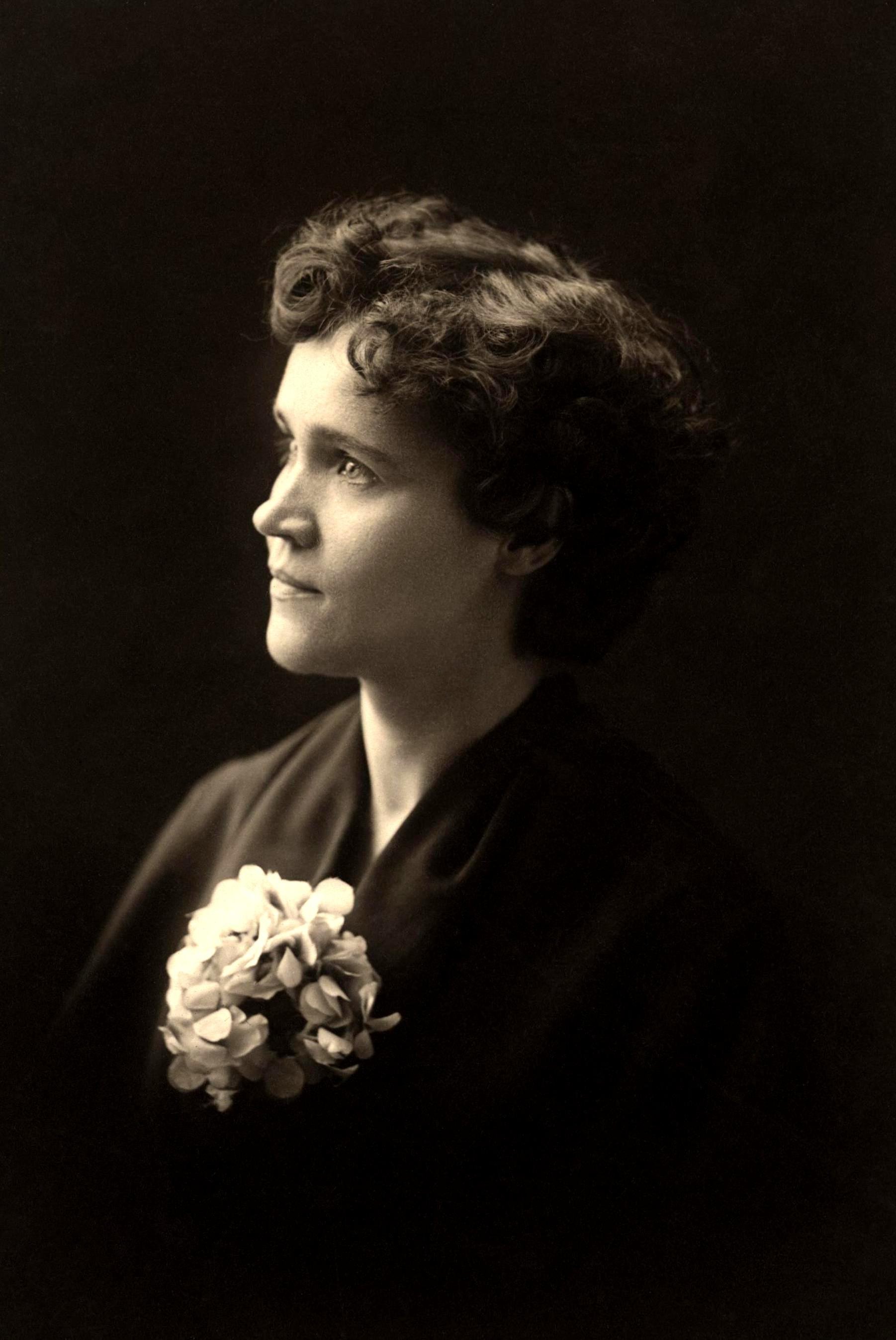
Voltairine de Cleyre, an early anarcha-feminist advocate of individualism

Anarcha-feminism holds the principle that "the personal is political", developing a critique of everyday life that aims to erode social and political power, in pursuit of a society where each individual had control over "[their] own life, and no others". Anarcha-feminists considered the nuclear family to be the root of all gender inequality; thus, equality could only be achieved through the extension of personal autonomy and economic independence to women. Although the institution of private property was roundly critiqued by anarcho-communists such as Emma Goldman, it was upheld as a means of women's economic emancipation by Voltairine de Cleyre.

Anarchist feminists such as Itō Noe have upheld the ideal of a "New Woman", encouraging women to assert their own individuality and develop independent thought. Emma Goldman conceived of a revolution that takes place within individual minds, as well as in society. Goldman advocated for women to exercise their autonomy by overcoming their own "internal tyrants", whether that be the opinions of their family members or traditional Social norms. According to Martha Hewitt, the anarcha-feminist conception of revolution is "as process, transformative praxis of thought, feeling, and collective social activity."

In the 1993 book The Politics of Individualism, the anarcha-feminist L. Susan Brown developed what she called an "existential individualism", which upheld individual autonomy and voluntary cooperation.

=== Reproductive rights ===
During the late 19th century, anarchist women were among the earliest to take up the call for reproductive rights, as part of the anarchist feminist opposition to the nuclear family. Anarchist feminists have distributed information about and resources for birth control, for which many were put in jail. While working as a midwife during the 1890s, Emma Goldman became a prominent advocate of women's reproductive rights, calling for women's rights to practice family planning and publicly rallying support for Margaret Sanger. In contrast, other anarchist feminists such as Itō Noe opposed abortion from a humanist perspective, as she believed that life began at conception.

Anarchist advocacy for birth control increased following World War I, as the practice was banned in countries like France and the United States, which anarchist feminists criticised a means to continue increasing the population in order to wage war. Anarchist feminist direct action for birth control continued even after the partial legalisation of abortion, as "feminist outlaw" groups like the Jane Collective provided food and medical care for women without access to safe methods of birth control. Anarchist feminists have also participated in the movement for reproductive justice, which has prioritised bodily autonomy and the reproductive self-determination of women of color.

=== Sex work ===
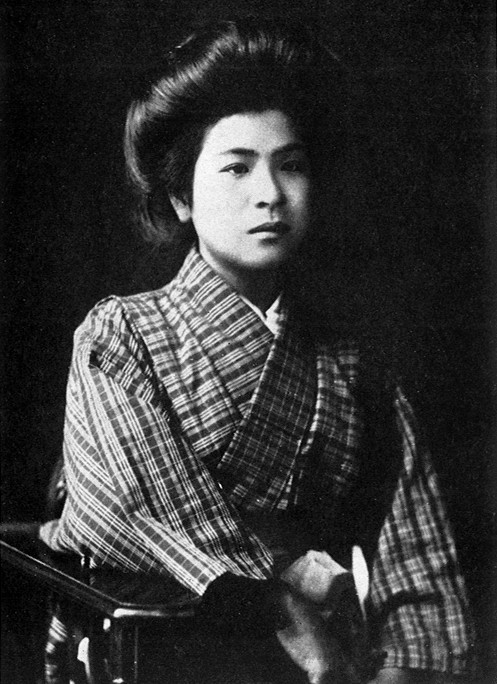
Itō Noe, an early anarcha-feminist advocate of sex workers' rights

Anarcha-feminists have been at the forefront of advocacy for sex workers' rights since the late-19th century, when anarchist women in Germany and France campaigned for the decriminalisation of sex work. Louise Michel blamed capitalism for creating the economic conditions that drove women towards sex work, which she claimed could only be brought to an end by means of a social revolution. Itō Noe likewise argued that the root cause of women taking up sex work was poverty, and that instead of campaigning to abolish sex work, people should address the root causes of poverty. Emma Goldman also publicly criticised sex work abolitionists for using male legal systems to criminalise women, which she held to be a form of class discrimination.

Following the second-wave of feminism, sex worker advocacy was taken up by anarchist feminists that themselves engaged in sex work. Grisélidis Réal organised sex workers and carried out a series of direct actions for sex workers' rights, going on to establish an archive for the history of sex work. Canadian anarchist sex workers were also involved in an advocacy campaign, culminating with the declaration of an "International Day to End Violence Against Sex Workers".

== See also ==
- Anarchism and issues related to love and sex
- Ecofeminism
- Feminist economics
- Feminist political ecology
- Feminist political theory
- Free Society
- Issues in anarchism
- Queer anarchism
- Relationship anarchy
- Seitō – Japanese feminist magazine also known as Bluestocking
- Women's health
- Women in the EZLN

== Bibliography ==
- Bottici, Chiara (2017). "Bodies in plural: Towards an anarcha-feminist manifesto". Thesis Eleven. 142: 99–111. doi:10.1177/0725513617727793. S2CID 148911963.
- Bottici, Chiara (18 November 2021a). Anarchafeminism. London: Bloomsbury Publishing. ISBN 9781350095854.
- Bottici, Chiara (2021b). "Anarchafeminism & the Ontology of the Transindividual". In Bianchi, Bernardo; Filion-Donato, Emilie; Miguel, Marlon; Yuva, Ayşe (eds.). Materialism and Politics. Cultural Inquiry. Vol. 20. Berlin: ICI Berlin Press. pp. 215–231. doi:10.37050/ci-20_12. ISBN 978-3-96558-018-3. S2CID 234145058.
- Brown, L. Susan (1995). "Beyond Feminism: Anarchism and Human Freedom". Reinventing Anarchy, Again. San Francisco: AK Press. pp. 149–154. ISBN 978-1-873176-88-7.
- Cohn, Jesse (2009). "Anarchism and Gender". In Ness, Immanuel (ed.). The International Encyclopedia of Revolution and Protest: 1500 to the Present. Vol. 1. Malden, MA: Wiley-Blackwell. pp. 122–126. doi:10.1002/9781405198073.wbierp0055. ISBN 9781405198073.
- Cornell, Andrew (2016). Unruly Equality: U.S. Anarchism in the Twentieth Century. University of California Press. ISBN 9780520286757.
- Dunbar-Ortiz, Roxanne, ed. (2002). Quiet Rumours: An Anarcha-Feminist Reader. Dark Star. ISBN 978-1-902593-40-1.
- Ferguson, Kathy (2011). Emma Goldman: Political Thinking in the Streets. Lanham, Maryland: Rowman & Littlefield. ISBN 978-1-4422-1048-6. LCCN 2010053529.
- Gay, Kathlyn; Gay, Martin (1999). Encyclopedia of Political Anarchy. ABC-CLIO. ISBN 978-0-87436-982-3.
- Guglielmo, Jennifer (2010). Living the Revolution: Italian Women's Resistance and Radicalism in New York City, 1880-1945. University of North Carolina Press. pp. 160–162. ISBN 9780807898222.
- Hane, Mikiso (2003) [1982]. "Women Rebels". Peasants, Rebels, Women, and Outcastes: The Underside of Modern Japan (2nd ed.). Maryland: Rowman & Littlefield Publishers. pp. 246–293. ISBN 0-7425-2525-2. LCCN 2002151950.
- Harrell, Willie J. Jr. (2012). ""I am an Anarchist": The Social Anarchism of Lucy E. Parsons". Journal of International Women's Studies. 13 (1): 1–18. ISSN 1539-8706. OCLC 8093224507.
- Jeppesen, Sandra; Nazar, Holly (2012). "Genders and Sexualities in Anarchist Movements". In Kinna, Ruth (ed.). The Continuum Companion to Anarchism. Continuum International Publishing Group. pp. 162–191. ISBN 978-1-4411-4270-2.
- Jeppesen, Sandra; Nazar, Holly (2017). "Anarchism and Sexuality". In Jun, Nathan (ed.). Brill's Companion to Anarchism and Philosophy. Leiden: Brill. pp. 216–252. doi:10.1163/9789004356894_010. ISBN 978-90-04-35689-4.
- Kaltefleiter, Caroline K. (31 December 2021). "Care and crisis in David Graeber's New York: Anarcha-feminism, gift economies, and mutual aid beyond a global pandemic". Anthropological Notebooks. 27 (3): 115–135. ISSN 1408-032X. Archived from the original on 25 September 2023.
- Kinna, Ruth (2017). "Anarchism and Feminism". In Jun, Nathan (ed.). Brill's Companion to Anarchism and Philosophy. Leiden: Brill. pp. 253–284. doi:10.1163/9789004356894_011. ISBN 978-90-04-35689-4.
- Kowal, Donna M. (2018). "Anarcha-Feminism". In Adams, Matthew S.; Levy, Carl (eds.). The Palgrave Handbook of Anarchism. London: Palgrave Macmillan. pp. 265–280. doi:10.1007/978-3-319-75620-2_15. ISBN 978-3319756196. S2CID 242073896.
- Liu, Lydia; Karl, Rebecca E.; Ko, Dorothy, eds. (2013). The Birth of Chinese Feminism: Essential Texts in Transnational Theory. New York: Columbia University Press. ISBN 9780231162906.
- Marshall, Peter H. (2008) [1992]. Demanding the Impossible: A History of Anarchism. London: Harper Perennial. ISBN 978-0-00-686245-1. OCLC 218212571.
- Molyneux, Maxine (2001). "'No God, No Boss, No Husband!': Anarchist Feminism in Nineteenth-Century Argentina". Women's movements in international perspective: Latin America and beyond. Palgrave MacMillan. pp. 13–37. doi:10.1057/9780230286382. ISBN 978-0-230-28638-2. LCCN 00062707.
- Mott, Carrie (2018). "Building Relationships within Difference: An Anarcha-Feminist Approach to the Micropolitics of Solidarity". Annals of the American Association of Geographers. 108 (2): 424–433. Bibcode:2018AAAG..108..424M. doi:10.1080/24694452.2017.1385378. S2CID 158338237.
- Nabiyyin, M. Hafizh (31 October 2023). "Anarcha-Feminism and Sustainable Development Goals: Case of Kurdish Women Protection Unit (YPJ)". Epistemik: Indonesian Journal of Social and Political Science. 4 (2): 81–98. doi:10.57266/epistemik.v4i2.172. ISSN 2807-811X.
- Presley, Sharon (2005). "No Authority but Oneself: The Anarchist Feminist Philosophy of Autonomy and Freedom". In Presley, Sharon; Sartwell, Crispin (eds.). Exquisite Rebel: The Essays of Voltairine De Cleyre – Anarchist, Feminist, Genius. Albany: State University of New York Press. pp. 191–194. ISBN 978-0-7914-6094-8.
- Pyne Addleson, Katheryn; Ackelsberg, Martha; Pyne, Shawn (2018) [1995]. "Anarchism and Feminism". In Tuana, Nancy; Tong, Rosemarie (eds.). Feminism And Philosophy: Essential Readings In Theory, Reinterpretation, And Application. Routledge. pp. 330–352. ISBN 978-0-8133-2213-1. LCCN 94-21411.
- Rogue, J. (2012). "De-essentializing Anarchist Feminism: Lessons from the Transfeminist Movement". In Daring, C. B.; Rogue, J.; Shannon, Deric; Volcano, Abbey (eds.). Queering Anarchism. AK Press. pp. 25–32. ISBN 978-1-84935-121-8. LCCN 2012914347.
- Shannon, Deric (31 July 2009). "Articulating a Contemporary Anarcha-Feminism" (PDF). Theory in Action. 2 (3): 58–74. doi:10.3798/tia.1937-0237.09013.
- Sievers, Sharon L. (1983). Flowers in Salt: The Beginnings of Feminist Consciousness in Modern Japan. Stanford: Stanford University Press. pp. 114–188. ISBN 0-8047-1165-8. LCCN 82-60104.
- Tanenbaum, Julia (2016). "To Destroy Domination in All Its Forms: Anarcha-Feminist Theory, Organization and Action 1970-1978". Perspectives on Anarchist Theory (29). Portland, Oregon: Institute for Anarchist Studies. ISBN 9781939202222. OCLC 1047756379. Archived from the original on 11 July 2017.
- Tuana, Nancy; Tong, Rosemarie, eds. (2018) [1995]. "Anarcha Feminist and Ecological Feminist Perspectives". Feminism And Philosophy: Essential Readings In Theory, Reinterpretation, And Application. Routledge. pp. 327–329. ISBN 978-0-8133-2213-1. LCCN 94-21411.
- Weber, Lindsay G. (2009). On the Edge of All Dichotomies: Anarch@-Feminist Thought, Organization and Action, 1970-1983 (Thesis). Wesleyan University. doi:10.14418/wes01.1.443.
- Zarrow, Peter (1988). "He Zhen and Anarcho-Feminism in China". The Journal of Asian Studies. 47 (4). Cambridge University Press: 796–813. doi:10.2307/2057853. JSTOR 2057853. S2CID 155072159.
- Zimmer, Kenyon (2015). Immigrants against the State: Yiddish and Italian Anarchism in America. University of Illinois Press. ISBN 9780252097430.
