= The Tyranny of Structurelessness =

Essay by Jo Freeman

"The Tyranny of Structurelessness" is an essay by American feminist Jo Freeman that concerns power relations within radical feminist collectives. The essay, inspired by Freeman's experiences in a 1960s women's liberation group, reflected on the feminist movement's experiments in resisting leadership hierarchy and structured division of labor. This lack of structure, Freeman writes, disguised an informal, unacknowledged, and unaccountable leadership, and in this way ensured its malefaction by denying its existence. As a solution, Freeman suggests formalizing the existing hierarchies in the group and subjecting them to democratic control.

The phrase has been used to describe one problem in organizing (the other being "rigidity of structure", according to ecofeminist Starhawk).

In 2008 Community Development Journal reviewed the article as a "classic text" which editors felt had influenced the practice of community development. That year a John F. Kennedy School of Government course used the paper in a course on leadership. Many Marxists and social anarchists cite the essay as an important text for developing effective and democratic forms of organizing, while some Marxists and many individualist anarchists argue that it fails to fully justify formal structures.

== Publication history ==
The essay originated as a speech given to the Southern Female Rights Union at a conference in Beulah, Mississippi, in May 1970. Freeman has stated that it was transcribed in 1971 for the feminist magazine Notes from the Third Year (whose editors chose not to publish it) and submitted to several women's liberation movement publications, only one of which sought her permission to publish it.

It was first officially published in the journal The Second Wave in 1972. Agitprop issued the essay pamphlet form in 1972. The Organisation of Revolutionary Anarchists, Leeds Group, United Kingdom, later distributed it as well. In 1973 the author published different versions in the Berkeley Journal of Sociology and in Ms. magazine. It was also published in Radical Feminism by Anne Koedt, Ellen Levine, and Anita Rapone. Later printings included that of the Anarchist Workers' Association (Kingston Group), and in 1984 in a pamphlet called Untying the Knot259-277: Feminism, Anarchism & Organisation jointly published by Dark Star Press and Rebel Press (printed by Aldgate Press).

== Criticism ==
Some Marxists, such as Mike Parker and Starhawk, have argued that Freeman's recommendations are not applicable to some organizations and can lead to over-structuring and inefficiency, especially in smaller organizations.

While the essay is a fundamental reading for many contemporary anarchists within social anarchism, the main branch of anarchism which envisions non-hierarchical forms of social organization, it contradicts various individualist anarchist perspectives, particularly insurrectionary anarchist and some other contemporary anarchist perspectives, which reject formalized structure as an impediment to socialist organizing. Anarcha-feminist Cathy Levine disagreed with Freeman's recommendation, which Levine considered patriarchal and regressive. Anarchist Jason McQuinn wrote that organizations with formal structures fare similarly if not worse. Carol Ehrlich discussed the negative impact of the article on anarchist organizing in Socialism, Anarchism And Feminism

== See also ==
- Leaderless resistance
