= SCOPE Project =

The Summer Community Organization and Political Education (SCOPE) Project of the Southern Christian Leadership Conference (SCLC) was a voter registration civil rights initiative conducted from 1965 to 1966 in 120 counties in six southern states. The goal was to recruit white college students to help prepare African Americans for voting and to maintain pressure on Congress to pass what became the Voting Rights Act of 1965. Dr. Martin Luther King announced the project at UCLA in April 1965, and other leaders recruited students nationwide.

== Founding ==
While leading the Chatham County Crusade For Voters in Savannah, Georgia, one of many SCLC affiliates across the South, Rev. Hosea Williams, an aide to SCLC chairman Martin Luther King Jr., was joined by white college students for various short-term civil rights projects. From that interracial success, they developed the idea of SCOPE. Dr. King and SCLC leaders decided to recruit white college students to journey south to join with local activists. The goals included preparing African Americans for voting, as they had mostly been long disenfranchised throughout the South. If necessary, they could participate in organizing street demonstrations to help put political pressure on Congress, should the proposed Voting Rights Act of 1965 be met with congressional resistance and stalling by segregationist forces.

In the winter and spring of 1965, the Voting Rights Movement in Selma, Alabama, and the Selma to Montgomery marches were challenging the segregated status quo. During the spring of 1965, Dr. King assigned Williams, SCLC's Director of Voter Registration and Political Education, to lead the SCOPE Project. The SCLC executive committee had approved it in December 1964. The project continued into the Fall of 1965 and Spring of 1966. Some of the white college volunteers returned in the summer of 1966, and a few enrolled in Black southern colleges and continued community organization activities beyond the spring of 1966.

Dr. King announced the SCOPE project in a speech at UCLA on April 27, 1965, and his visit resulted in the recruitment of twenty UCLA students, including Joel Siegel and Rick Tuttle, who worked with Williams and Andrew Young. Tuttle was held for two months in a Savannah jail as a result of his movement activities. Tuttle's case resulted in a court ruling to allow the use of property bonds for bail for civil rights workers.

The SCLC staff sent regional recruitment teams to visit colleges and universities nationwide. Gwendolyn Green, the executive director of the Western Christian Leadership Conference, joined Dr. King at UCLA and was temporarily assigned to the Atlanta office to serve as the Assistant SCOPE director, reporting to Williams and King.

== Youth volunteers ==
Initially, the SCLC had hoped to recruit 2000 volunteers, but college students from the north and west did not respond in the hoped-for numbers. This was believed due to the sometimes extreme danger that had already erupted against activists in the mid-60s civil rights movement in the South, such as the Mississippi civil rights workers' murders and Selma to Montgomery march. Eventually about 500 predominantly white college volunteers—representing nearly 100 universities—were deployed in 90 of the 120 counties targeted by SCOPE across six southern states. Williams sometimes redeployed students and assigned them to more than one county. A combat-decorated veteran of World War II, he had received leadership training as an Army Sgt. in General George Patton's Black tank brigade.

== Training ==
The SCOPE project began on June 14, 1965, with a week-long orientation at Morris Brown College in Atlanta. It was led by Bayard Rustin, activist and organizer of the 1963 March on Washington. Other faculty included: Vernon Jordan of the Urban League; Ralph Helstein, president of the Meatpackers Union; John Doar, US Assistant Attorney for Civil Rights; Michael Harrington, author of The Other America, about the problems of persistent poverty in the US; civil rights lawyer Charles Morgan, Jr., and Dr. King, Young, Rev. Ralph Abernathy, Junius Griffin, Rev. James Bevel, and others on the SCLC Executive Staff.

== Activist accomplishments ==
In the targeted counties, where there was a history of black voter disenfranchisement, the student volunteers were led by those local African-American leaders who had requested their aid; they were joined by Black community volunteers, including local ministers and numerous local high school and college youth. During a ten-week initiative, the SCOPE Project registered an estimated 49,000 new voters through the combined efforts of the local community and the SCOPE college volunteers, from June 14 – August 28, 1965. In addition, SCOPE educated thousands of citizens in political and voter literacy education classes.

The volunteers tested and reported violations of the 1964 Civil Rights Act and the Voting Rights Act (signed into law August 9, 1965) to John Doar, Assistant Attorney General for Civil Rights. Based on this and related data, the U.S. Department of Justice (DOJ) conducted investigations and deployed Federal voter registrars to counties that denied African Americans' right to vote. SCLC field staff and SCOPE volunteers also worked with the DOJ Community Relations Service (CRS). They engaged in nonviolent demonstrations to dramatize the denial of voting rights, and the refusal of local jurisdictions to remove "white only" signs and desegregate public accommodations in accordance with the 1964 Act.

SCLC and other organizations bridged racial and religious barriers to forge partnerships with both white Christian and Jewish groups, along with progressives in the Southern Regional Council and other organizations.

The students lived with African-American families, who were paid $15 a week for their room and board, which barely covered expenses. About 40 of these college volunteers were invited by Dr. King, Williams, and his assistant, Gwendolyn Green, to join the SCLC Field Staff. They were paid a subsistence salary of $5 a week, and the African-American community provided housing and meals. Many veterans from other SCLC campaigns were assigned to the SCOPE project, including: Field Staff members Rev. Willie Bolden, Benjamin Van Clark, Jimmie L. Wells, Lula Williams, Lena Turner, Gloria Wise, Jewell Wise, Patricia Simpson, R. B. Cottonreader, J.T. Johnson, Tom Houck, Dana Swan, Rev. James Orange, Ben "Sunshine" Owens, "Big Lester" Hankerson, Leon Hall, Bruce Hartford, and others. Both Albert Turner and Stony Cooks worked closely with Williams in statewide leadership roles.

SCOPE volunteers were subject to violence, tear-gassing, harassment, and threats with guns on numerous occasions, according to "incident reports" from the project's administrative records. On June 18, 1965, in Camden, Alabama, for example, 18 SCOPE workers were arrested in a church for "illegal possession of boycott materials." One SCOPE worker, Mike Farley, was beaten in jail by a white prisoner, who was reportedly both bribed and threatened by a jailer to attack Farley. On July 8 in Wilcox County, Alabama, three cars carrying SCOPE workers were shot at by white men, after police stopped SCOPE workers and spoke with white men. On July 15, in Chatham County, Georgia, SCOPE worker Shirley Savaris was threatened by a white man with a gun and told to leave town. The next day in Taliaferro County, Georgia, SCOPE workers were threatened by a deputy sheriff and county attorney with beatings and killings, "if they did not leave town the next day." Also in Taliaferro County, on July 23, SCOPE volunteer Richard Copeland was beaten by two whites on the courthouse steps in Crawfordsville, the county seat. On July 28 in Sussex County, Virginia, two SCOPE workers, Gary Imsland and Elke Wiedenroth, were run off the road while returning from a church meeting, and threatened by a white man armed with a shotgun. In Luverne, Alabama, on August 3, SCOPE workers Dunbar Reed, Bruce Hartford, and Carol Richardson, along with a number of local students, were attacked and beaten by a white mob after they integrated a local cafe. On August 18 in Berkeley County, South Carolina, two SCOPE volunteers were beaten after attempting to integrate restaurants in Monk's Corner. The local SCOPE office and volunteer residence was shot up the following day.

== SCOPE veterans legacy ==
The SCOPE volunteers have been profoundly affected on a personal level throughout their lives by these inter-racial experiences, as have been the host families and communities. Press accounts termed the SCOPE volunteers "the freedom corps." Although the college students did not lead the civil rights movement, they were a part of a generational vanguard between 1961 and 1966, of about 3,000 whites who were willing to risk real danger by participating in the movement struggle in the South. In an August 1965 interview with Stanford University radio station, Rev. Hosea Williams predicted that the SCOPE volunteers would provide significant future leadership to America because of these experiences.

Within the ranks of SCOPE students, there have been many who became leaders in various fields, including: Dr. Jo Freeman, author/journalist; Father James Groppi, activist Catholic priest; Dr. Barbara Jean Emerson, college administrator; Elizabeth Omilami, actress and current CEO of Hosea's Feed The Hungry and Homeless Inc, a non-profit that provides food and assistance to the poor in Atlanta; Rabbi Moshe Shur, Hillel Rabbi at Queens College; Peter Geffen, international educator and founder of the Abraham Heschel Day School in NYC; Dr. Dean Savage, chair, Dept of Sociology, Queens College;, Dr. James Simons, M.D., oncologist, Kaiser Hospital, Oakland, California, Judy Van Allen, Institute For African Development, Cornell University; Dick Reavis, professor, NC State University; Dr. Bruce Mirhoff, professor, SUNY; Bruce Hartford, co-founder Civil Rights Vets website; Beth Pickens, attorney – NYC; Joel Siegel, film critic for Good Morning America; Rick Tuttle, served for 16 years as Los Angeles City Controller; and others. The names of additional participants who became leaders can be found on the civil rights vets website.

John Lewis (1940–2020), Student Nonviolent Coordinating Committee (SNCC) chairman from 1963 to 1966 (later a politician and U.S. Congressman representing Atlanta for decades), had welcomed the SCOPE volunteers as "Brothers and sisters in the movement." He described them as willing to put their lives on the line for freedom. Lewis was jailed with white SCOPE workers, along with local African-American SNCC and SCLC volunteers, in Americus, Georgia, on August 1, 1965, after attempting to integrate local churches. As Lewis said in 2006 during a session at Atlanta's Oglethorpe University, "The SCOPE volunteers were no different than Freedom Summer workers; we were all together that summer of 1965, and we all took the same risks. The SCOPE volunteers stood shoulder to shoulder with us in our struggle for civil and voting rights."

In assessing the contributions of the SCOPE volunteers, Andrew Young, who later became a politician, serving as a U.S. Congressman, United Nations Ambassador, and Mayor of Atlanta, told a King Holiday audience in Atlanta, "The volunteers in SCOPE knew that some of the Freedom Summer workers had been killed the Summer before, but they came anyway." On another occasion, he told a reunion of civil rights Movement volunteers, including SCOPE veterans, "Most of you were taking your lives in your hands by associating with us. It made us truly a national movement, when the students came. Their parents had to learn about the South."

Books about SCOPE by its participants include: This Bright Light of Ours: Stories from the Voting Rights Fight, Maria Gitin, University of Alabama Press, Feb 2014. Willy Siegel Leventhal offered his collection of SCOPE documents and essays: The SCOPE of Freedom, to enable Gitin to contact some of her co-workers and to conduct some fact checking.
