= Hothead Paisan =

Alternative comic by Diane DiMassa

- cover of Hothead Paisan #8
- Genre: humor
- Publication date: 1991

Creative team
- Created by: Diane DiMassa

Hothead Paisan: Homicidal Lesbian Terrorist is an alternative comic written and drawn by Diane DiMassa published 1991–1998. It features the title character generally wreaking violent vengeance on male oppressors. Recurring characters include Hothead's cat Chicken, her wise mystical friend Roz, a talking lamp, and her lover Daphne.

== Publication ==
The series began in 1991, published under the imprint Giant Ass Publishing, run by DiMassa's partner, Stacy Sheehan. The series ran for 21 issues, ending in 1998, and were collected and published as two volumes: Hothead Paisan and The Revenge of Hothead Paisan. These volumes were later combined and republished with a 10-page introduction to the main character as a 428-page trade paperback The Complete Hothead Paisan.

== Hothead ==
According to Gabrielle Dean, the character of Hothead represents a "phallicized dyke" who is "at the mercy of her own rage against society, which she expresses by castrating men who are exaggerated stand-ins for the patriarchal order". Hothead has changed into a wolf and her hands have become chainsaws. Kim Hall states that Hothead "is an image of feminist resistance that does not rest on purity."

In 2004, a version was staged as a musical, produced by Animal Prufrock at the Michigan Womyn's Music Festival. The cast included Ani DiFranco, Susan Powter, Ubaka Hill, Toshi Reagon, Julie Wolf, Kate Wolf, and Allyson Palmer of BETTY.

== See also ==
- Dykes to Watch Out For
- Jane's World
- Wimmen's Comix
