= Diane DiMassa =

American feminist artist (born 1959)

- Born: 1959 (age 66–67) New Haven, Connecticut
- Area: Cartoonist
- Notable works: Hothead Paisan, Homicidal Lesbian Terrorist

Diane DiMassa (born 1959) is an American feminist artist, noted as creator of the alternative cartoon character Hothead Paisan, Homicidal Lesbian Terrorist, whose wild antics have been described as rage therapy for the marginalised. DiMassa is also active in oil painting and street art.

== Hothead Paisan ==
Hothead Paisan made its debut in 1991, and was initially published four times a year by Giant Ass Publishing (Stacy Sheehan and Diane DiMassa). The series was part of an underground zine explosion in the early 1990s, and instantly snared a loyal cult following. DiMassa published Hothead Paisan from 1991 to 1996; the whole series has been collected into the anthology The Complete Hothead Paisan, published by Cleis Press. It contains all 21 issues, plus 20 extra pages. The original issues are still available on the Hothead Paisan website.

Hothead Paisan is rage therapy for the marginalized and disaffected, the fed up, and anyone sickened by society's ills. Her readers comprise a full spectrum of gender, orientation, race and class. Hothead literally started out as journal material to vent and deal with anger issues by DiMassa when first entering into drug and alcohol recovery. The first issue, published as a mini-comic, was twelve pages long and elicited a roaring response, giving rise to the ongoing series, and soon after, a line of merchandise called "Groovy Crapola" which included shirts, mugs, hats, and rubber stamps.

Hothead has no filter and reacts viscerally and violently to the injustices of the world, acting out fantasies that "normal" people have but would never act on. Her cat, Chicken, brings in a more spiritual, wise, and wise-cracking element. Hothead's best friend Roz is an older psychic blind woman who is a pacifist and almost endlessly patient with Hothead.

According to DiMassa, the themes reflected in Hothead Paisan are "less about anything particularly lesbian, and more about a slant on how unbalanced society is" and represents a "matter of astuteness among [her] fans than really gayness .. although ninety percent of them are gay." This societal imbalance is explained in the Gabrielle Dean's feminist analysis of the comic strip which postulates that Hothead is a "phallicized dyke" who is "at the mercy of her own rage against society, which she expresses by castrating men who are exaggerated stand-ins for the patriarchal order.

In 2002, a candy bar named after Hothead Paisan — the "Homicidal Lesbian Terrorist" booster bar — sold out quickly in San Francisco, where DiMassa was living at the time.

== Other work ==
DiMassa illustrated the Pussycat Fever chapbook by the late Kathy Acker, along with Freddie Baer (AK Press, 1995); My Gender Workbook by Kate Bornstein (which won a 1999 Firecracker Alternative Book Award); and Sexing the Body by Anne-Fausto Sterling. DiMassa illustrated Jokes and the Unconscious, a graphic novel written by poet and writer Daphne Gottlieb, which was published by Cleis Press in 2006.

DiMassa has contributed to numerous comic and literary anthologies from the early 1990s to the present, the most recent being Live Through This (Seven Stories Press), which is a collection of prose and art by women describing the role that art has played in dealing with issues such as addiction.

== Current work ==
DiMassa currently does a bit of cartooning and illustration, but focuses mainly on oil painting and street art pieces, often based on Hothead Paisan and Chicken.

== Personal life ==
DiMassa grew up in West Haven, Connecticut.

== Bibliography ==
- Hothead Paisan: Homicidal Lesbian Terrorist, Pittsburgh, Pa. : Cleis Press, 1993.
- "A Day with Chicken", 3 p. in Gay Comics #22 (Summer 1994).
- "Mightier than the Sorehead: Drawing Pens and Politics", p. 45-54, The Nation, v. 258, no. 2 (Jan. 17, 1994).
- The Revenge of Hothead Paisan, Homicidal Lesbian Terrorist, Pittsburgh, Pa. : Cleis Press, 1995.
- "Born Queer", p. 60 in Gay Comics #25 (Spring 1998).
- Diane, DiMassa (1999). Complete Hothead Paisan. San Francisco: Cleis Press. ISBN 1-57344-084-1.
- Jokes and the Unconscious, with Daphne Gottlieb (2006). San Francisco: Cleis Press. ISBN 1-57344-250-X.

== In popular culture ==
Her name appears in the lyrics of the Le Tigre song "Hot Topic."

== See also ==
- 1990s in comics
- List of comics creators
- List of LGBTQ artists
