= Freddie Baer =

American artist (1952–2025)

- Born: Frederika Baer; September 10, 1952; Chicago, Illinois, U.S.
- Died: November 12, 2025 (aged 73); Eureka, California, U.S.
- Occupation: Artist
- Known for: Collage art, activism

Fredrika Baer (September 10, 1952 – November 12, 2025) was an American collage artist and graphic designer, associated with anarchist, feminist and science fiction fandom communities. Her works were widely published as covers of many magazines and books, and disseminated as stand-alone political pieces.

== Life and career ==
Fredrika Elizabeth Baer was born and raised in Chicago. During high school and college, she had already become political, leading a petition against "artificial settings" and surveillance in high school.

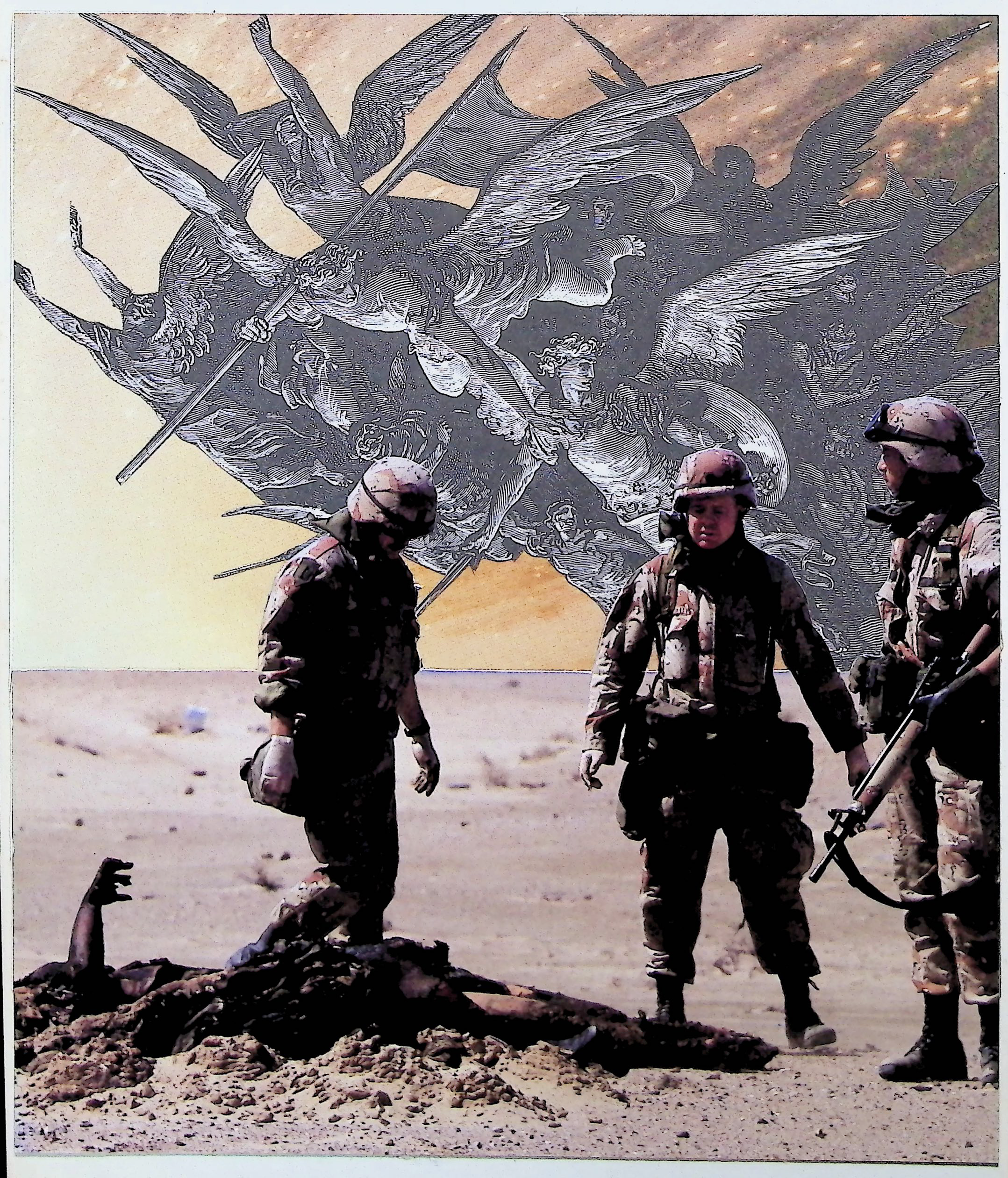
War was a common theme, particularly in Baer's early collages.

In college, she was exposed to anarchism by Neil Rest, and joined the "Nameless Anarchist Horde". Over the next few years, Baer worked with a number of radical media and activist organizations, including the IWW, Solidarity Bookstore, Newspace, and Black and Red, a printing/publishing group established by Fredy and Lorraine Perlman.

Baer achieved national notoriety in 1972 for an action targeting the author of a pro-rape article in the campus newspaper. Baer and two colleagues invited him to join them, then held him down and talked to him about the realities of rape. Baer was arrested and charged with rape, but was released due in part to the belief at that time that women could not rape men. The incident was immortalized by singer-songwriter Leslie Fish, "The Bold Rapista". Baer described the incident herself in various publications and interviews, including Black Flag: Organ of the Anarchist Black Cross.

Baer began collage and illustration work in 1981, after attending an art show reception for Incite!, a San Francisco-based radical collage group. Her first collage was "Bosses: The Real Time Bandits" (1981).

Throughout the 1980s and 1990s, Baer was involved in the local anarchist and punk scene, designing many posters, album covers, and illustrations for books, articles, and works of fiction. She worked with Processed World, which she later described as a "fiasco", Fifth Estate, Anarchy, AK Press, Times Change Press, and Komotion International. She illustrated many works by Peter Lamborn Wilson, aka Hakim Bey, and was particularly associated with the Situationists and surrealist movements. Baer's numerous collaborations with Wilson (Hakim Bey) were also reflected in his preface to her 1992 collection, Ecstatic Incisions.

In the 1990s and 2000s, Baer's work with the science fiction community greatly increased. In addition to illustrations in numerous science fiction & fantasy publications, Baer began designing posters for SF cons and awards, including JaneCon, Potlatch, WisCon, and the James Tiptree, Jr. Memorial Award (later re-named the "Otherwise Award").

In 2020, Baer relocated to Eureka, California. She died after a three-year battle with uterine cancer in Eureka, on November 12, 2025, at the age of 73.

== Critical reception and influences ==
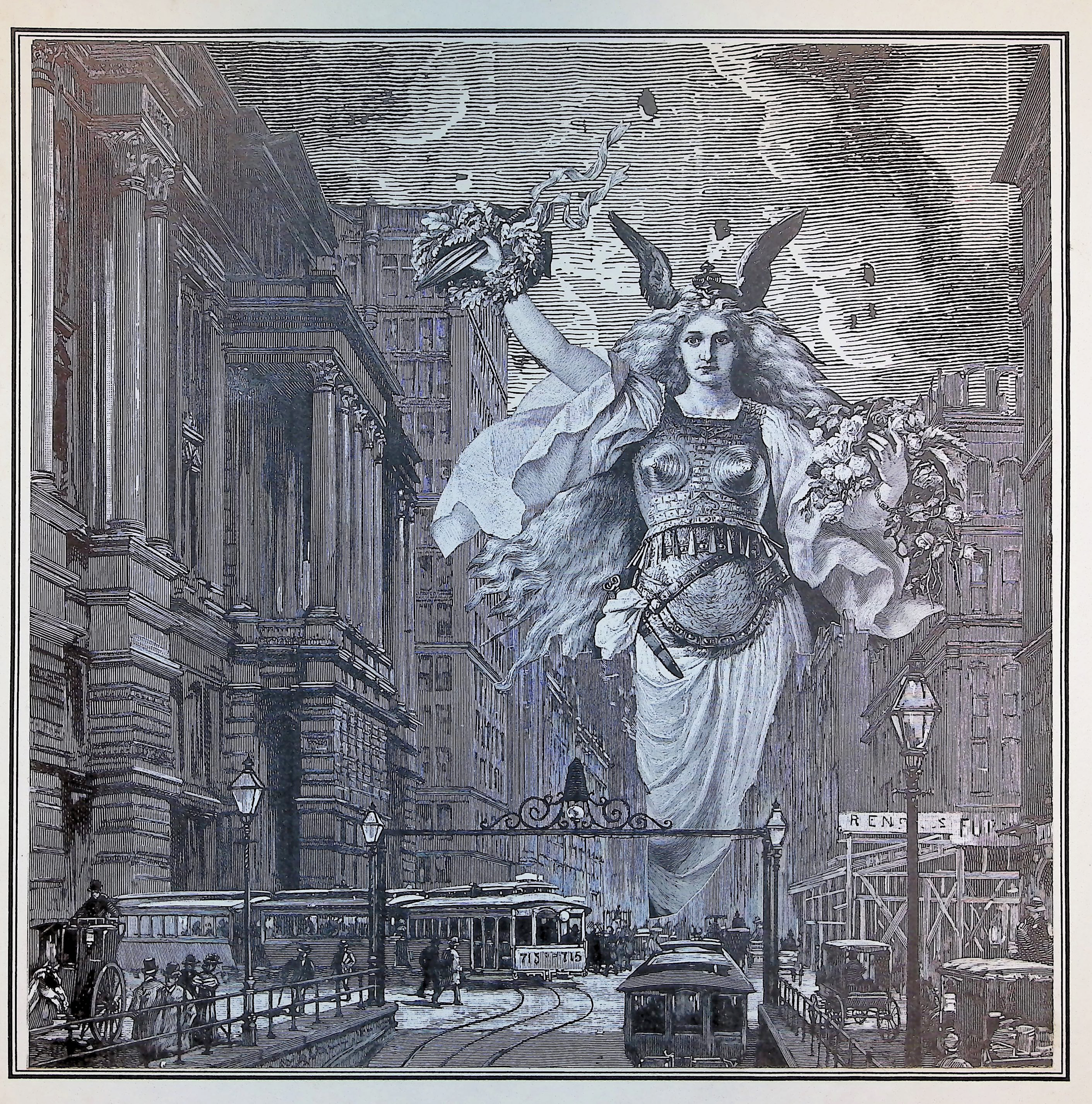
"Don't Fuck with Mother Nature", originally published in the "T-Shirt of the Month Club" (November 1989) and reprinted multiple times.

Baer was known for intricate and detailed collages with a great deal of detailed cutting. While she incorporated digital work into her collage, she primarily worked with exacto blades, glue, and original printed work. She was particularly known for collaging together vintage illustrations of nature, women, and patterns, with modern imagery of technology. Her style was described as "juxtapos[ing] graceful archetypal medieval figures and nudes beside the charged symbols of modern technological and industrial life" "The dexterity with which she performs her craft complements the painstaking work of the original engraves. Not a paste-up blunder in sight." "She has taken very traditional, conservative images and created from them witty, anarchic, shocking and beautiful viewing."

"Looking through Ecstatic Incisions, there appear to be four basic styles of collage which Baer uses: images contrived solely of nineteenth century engravings; ones with a patchwork of geometric construction; ones using photographs and ones where text is integrated into the design. ... [In contrast with Max Ernst ], Baer's work is clearly created from different pieces -- she plays with scale; she often has large figures in the foreground which break out of the picture frame, and her placement of objects is much more straight forward. Ernst's collages reflect his background as a painter, whilst Baer's compositions are of a more graphic bent."

Baer's subject matter was described as "ranging from the bitingly political to the sublimely surreal".

She is mentioned by critics as an important collagist of the "marginal milieu" of punk, political, and literary zines along with contemporaries such as James Koehnline, Ed Lawrence, Joe Schwind, and Mykell Zhan.

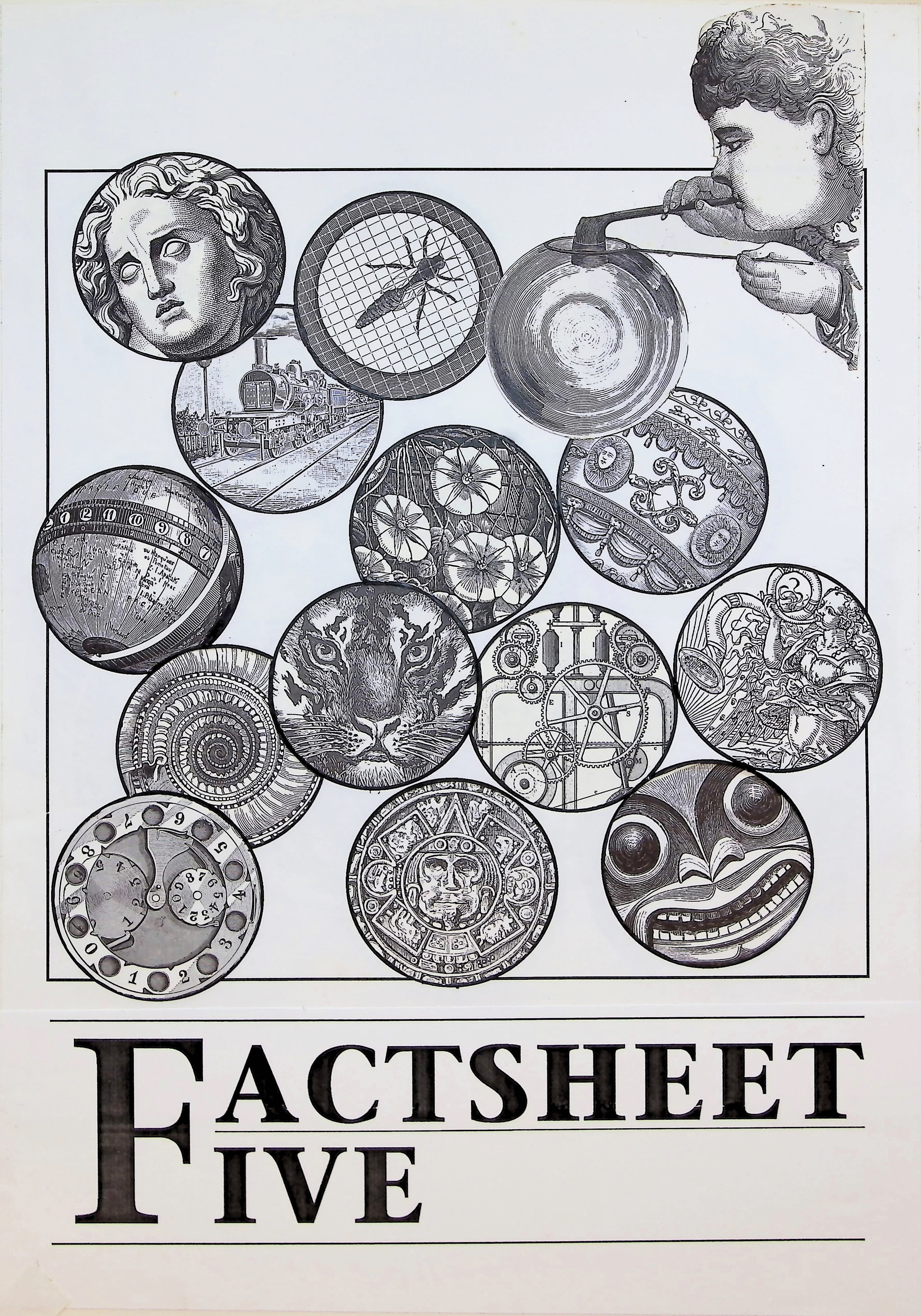
Graphic used for Factsheet Five.

R. Seth Friedman of Factsheet Five names her as an influence on his art.

== Published works ==
- Ecstatic Incisions: The Collage Art of Freddie Baer (AK Press, 1992) (collects 40+ previously published collages)

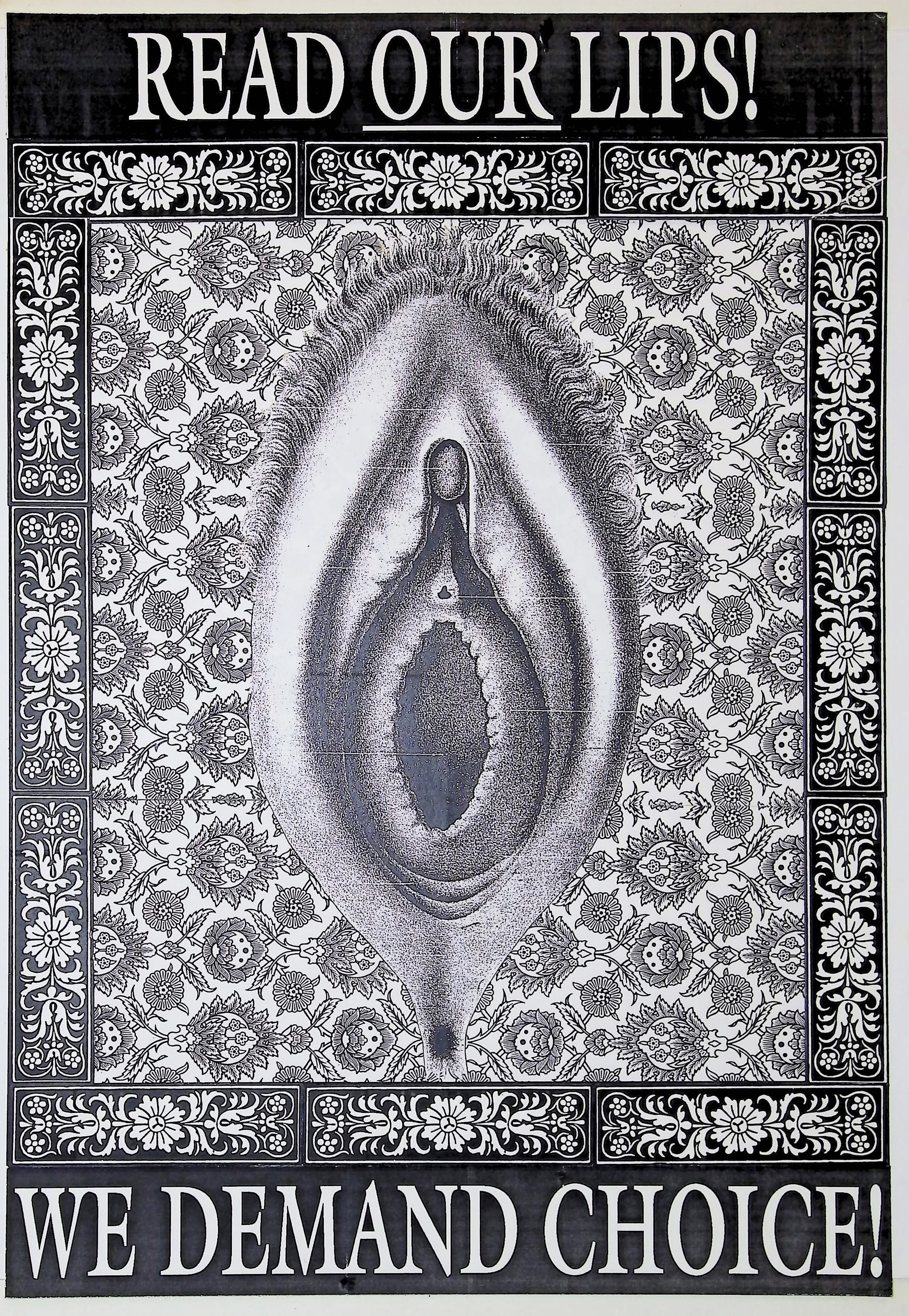
"Read OUR Lips!: We Demand Choice!", Collage by Freddie Baer, 1990. Scan of original collage.

Covers and other notable collages

- 1988, cover, Factsheet Five #25 (February 1988)
- 1989, cover, Anarchy #20/21 (Aug.-Oct. 1989)
- 1989, "Don't Fuck with Mother Nature" (widely reprinted)
- 1990, "Read Our Lips! We Demand Choice!" (in the collections of the Oakland Museum of California; widely reprinted)
- 1991, cover, Anarchy #29 (Summer 1991)
- 1991, cover, Science Fiction Eye #8 (Winter 1991)
- 1991-2016, annual collages for the James Tiptree Jr. Award (later "Otherwise Award")
- 1991, cover, T.A.Z.: The Temporary Autonomous Zone, Ontological Anarchy, Poetic Terrorism (Autonomedia 1991)
- 1993, cover, Her Smoke Rose Up from Supper
- 1994, cover, Immediatism: Essays by Hakim Bey (AK Press 1994)
- 1994, cover, Interactive Fantasy: The Journal of Role-Playing and Story-Making Systems #2
- 1995, cover & interior illustrations, The Raw Brunettes by Lorraine Scheine (Wordcraft of Oregon: Wordcraft Speculative Writers #8, 1995)
- 1995, illustrations in Pussycat Fever by Kathy Acker (with Diane DiMassa)
- 1996, cover, Neat Sheets: The Poetry of James Tiptree, Jr.
- 1996, cover, Reinventing Anarchy, Again, ed. by Howard J. Ehrlich
- 1996, cover, The Larger Earth: Descending Notes of a Grounded Astronaut: A Cycle of Poems by David Memmott (Permeable Press 1996)
- 1998, cover, Flying Cups and Saucers: Gender Explorations in Science Fiction and Fantasy, ed. by Debbie Notkin (Edgewood Press 1998)
- 1998, cover, Seizing the Airwaves: A Free Radio Handbook, ed. by Ron Sakolsky & Stephen Dunifer (AK Press 1998) (Cover collage, book design, & layout work)
- 1999, cover, Women of Other Worlds: Excursions Through Science Fiction and Feminism, ed. by Helen Merrick & Tess Williams (University of Western Australia Press, 1999)
- 2002, cover, Chunga #2
- 2003, cover, Cigar-Box Faust and Other Miniatures by Michael Swanwick (Tachyon Publications 2003)

Articles and writings

- “The Daily Battle”, Anarchy: A Journal of Desire Armed, #8 (Oct. / Nov. 1995), pp. 5-6
- “Valerie Solanas” (biographical overview), in The SCUM Manifesto by Valerie Solanas (AK Press, 2013)

The Surreg(gion)alist Manifesto by Max Cafard

== Reviews and criticism ==
- “Review of Ecstatic Incisions“, Freedom, vol. 53 no. 19 (March 10, 1992).
- Just Say No (July 1992)
- Interzone, July 1992
- Profane Existence #15 (Summer 1992)
- “Ecstatic Incisions by Freddie Baer“, Socialist (Sept. 1992) – “Revolutionary coffee-table book of the month.”
- Ray Violet, Tribune: Labour’s Independent Weekly, #18 (Sept. 1992)
- Charlotte Ross, “Ecstatic Incisions“, Harpies & Quimes #3 (October 1992)
- SF Weekly, May 20, 1993
- Heaven Bone (#10)
- GirlFrenzy #3, “Cut-Up Women: The Work of Freddie Baer and Anna Pedroza”, pp. 16-17
- Allan Antliff, Anarchy and Art: From the Paris Commune to the Fall of the Berlin Wall (Arsenal Pulp Press 2007)
- Neala Schleuning, Artpolitik: Social Anarchist Aesthetics in an Age of Fragmentation (Minor Compositions / Autonomedia, 2013), Chapter 8: Social Anarchist Aesthetics in an Age of Fragmentation, pp. 233-285.
- Yetta Howard, “Unsuitable for Children? Adult-erated Age in Underground Graphic Narratives”, American Literature, v.90, n.2 (June 2018) (discussing Pussycat Fever, text by Kathy Acker and illustrations by Freddie Baer and Diane DiMassa).
