= Howard J. Ehrlich =

American sociologist, educator, and author

- Born: 1932; New York, New York, U.S.
- Died: February 2, 2015 (aged 82); Baltimore, Maryland
- Occupation: Sociologist

Howard J. Ehrlich (1932–2015) was a sociologist, educator, and author.

== Early life and career ==
External videos
- Interview with Ehrlich, 2011

Howard J. Ehrlich was born and raised in New York City. He later graduated from Columbus, Ohio, public schools. He studied sociology at Ohio State University and received a bachelor's in 1953 and a master's in 1955. He completed his Ph.D. in Sociology and anthropology at Michigan State University in 1959.

He joined the University of Iowa faculty for six years beginning in 1965. Ehrlich moved to Charles Village, Baltimore, in 1971. He hosted a radio program on WBJC for 20 years and started Research Group One, a publisher of pamphlets. In the 1980s, he began editing Social Anarchism and opened the alternative Baltimore School. Ehrlich worked as research director of the University of Baltimore's National Institute Against Prejudice and Violence from 1986 to 1993, when it closed. He continued the institute's work with his own Prejudice Institute through the end of his life. Ehrlich died in Baltimore on February 2, 2015, of Parkinson's and cardiac disease.

Ehrlich published eight books including Hate Crime and Ethnoviolence (2009) and The Best of Social Anarchism (2013).

== Personal life ==
Ehrlich was married twice. His second marriage was with Patricia Webbink. They raised her son together.

== See also ==
- Reinventing Anarchy – 1979 anthology edited by Ehrlich
- Reinventing Anarchy, Again (AK Press, 1996; cover by Freddie Baer)
