= Reinventing Anarchy =

1979 book

- Editor: Howard J. Ehrlich, et al.
- Subject: Anthology
- Publisher: Routledge & Kegan Paul
- Publication date: 1979
- Pages: 371

Reinventing Anarchy: What Are Anarchists Thinking These Days? is a 1979 anthology of essays about anarchism edited by Howard Ehrlich, Carol Ehrlich, David de Leon, and Glenda Morris.

A review by historian Paul Avrich notes that while the editors claim to synthesize a new view of anarchism, in practice the anthology retreads old concepts, and excludes international perspectives, economics and education, and individualist anarchism.

Reinventing Anarchy was followed by a second volume some years later, Reinventing Anarchy, Again (AK Press, 1996, cover by Freddie Baer), expanded and with new material.

== Bibliography ==
- Avrich, Paul (1982). "Rev. of Reinventing Anarchy". Labor History. 23: 440. doi:10.1080/00236568208584667. ISSN 0023-656X. ProQuest 1312149271.
- Barker, Rodney (July 6, 1979). "Rev. of Pierre-Joseph Proudhon by Edward Hyams; Reinventing Anarchy edited by Howard Ehrlich, Carol Ehrlich, David de Leon and Glenda Morris; The American as Anarchist by David de Leon; An Anti-Statist Communist Manifesto by Joseph Lane; Towards a Fresh Revolution by The Friends of Durruti". Tribune. pp. 8–9. ISSN 0041-2821. ProQuest 1866613716.
- Crick, Bernard (April 5, 1979). "Bombs and flowers". The Guardian. London. p. 10. ISSN 0261-3077. ProQuest 186124067.
- douglas, carol anne (1981). "Review of reinventing anarchy: what are anarchists doing these days?". Off Our Backs. 11 (4): 20–21. ISSN 0030-0071. JSTOR 25793697.
- Fischer, George (1980). "Review of Reinventing Anarchy: What are Anarchists Thinking These Days". Contemporary Sociology. 9 (5): 709–710. doi:10.2307/2065526. ISSN 0094-3061. JSTOR 2065526.
- Johnson, Scott (1982). "Rev. of Reinventing Anarchy". Qualitative Sociology. 5 (4): 334–337. ISSN 0162-0436. ProQuest 61192717.
- Ward, Colin (1979). "Reinventing Anarchy: What Are Anarchists Thinking These Days?". New Society. 48 (863): 156. ProQuest 61218236.
- Williams, Dana; Shantz, Jeffrey (2016). "An Anarchist in the Academy, a Sociologist in the Movement: The Life, Activism, and Ideas of Howard J. Ehrlich". Journal for the Study of Radicalism. 10 (2): 101–122. doi:10.14321/jstudradi.10.2.0101. ISSN 1930-1189. JSTOR 10.14321/jstudradi.10.2.0101. S2CID 151995340.
- Woodcock, George (1980). "Anarchist Phases and Personalities". Queen's Quarterly. Vol. 87, no. 1. pp. 82–96. ISSN 0033-6041. ProQuest 1296885359.
