= Jo Freeman =

American feminist, political scientist, writer and attorney

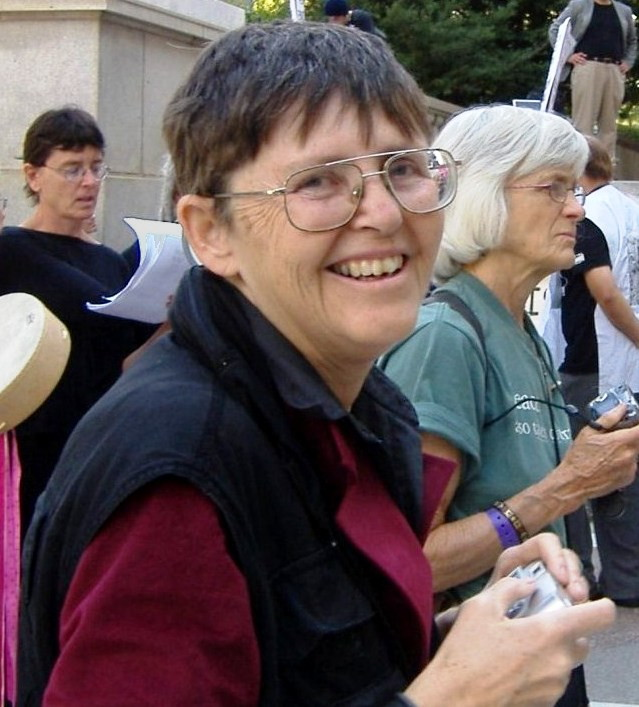
- Jo Freeman at September 2006 peace protest at U.S. Congress
- Born: August 26, 1945 (age 81); Atlanta, Georgia, U.S.
- Other name: Joreen
- Awards: Root-Tilden Scholarship

Academic background
- Education: University of Chicago
- Thesis: The politics of women's liberation: a case study of an emerging social movement and its relation to the policy process (1973)

Academic work
- Main interests: feminism, political science, law
- Website: jofreeman.com

Jo Freeman aka Joreen (born August 26, 1945), is an American feminist, political scientist, writer and attorney. As a student at the University of California, Berkeley in the 1960s, she became active in organizations working for civil liberties and the civil rights movement. She went on to do voter registration and community organization in Alabama and Mississippi and was an early organizer of the women's liberation movement. She authored several classic feminist articles as well as important papers on social movements and political parties. She has also written extensively about women, particularly on law and public policy toward women and women in mainstream politics.

== Early life and education ==
Jo Freeman was born in Atlanta, Georgia, in 1945. Her mother Helen was from Hamilton, Alabama, and had served during World War II as a first lieutenant in the Women's Army Corps, stationed in England. When Jo was six years old, Helen moved to Los Angeles, where she taught junior high school until shortly before her death from emphysema. Freeman attended Birmingham High School, but graduated in the first class of Granada Hills High School in 1961.

Freeman received her BA with honors in political science from UC Berkeley in 1965. She began her graduate work in political science at the University of Chicago in 1968, and completed her PhD in 1972. After four years of teaching at the State University of New York, Freeman went to Washington, D.C. as a Brookings Fellow, and stayed another year as an American Political Science Association Congressional Fellow. She entered New York University School of Law in 1979 as a Root-Tilden Scholar, and received her JD degree in 1982. She was admitted to the New York State Bar in 1983.

Freeman moved to Park Slope, Brooklyn in 1979 to attend law school and has lived in Kensington, Brooklyn since 1985.

== Student activist at UC Berkeley ==
At UC Berkeley, Freeman was active in the university Young Democrats and the campus political party, SLATE. SLATE worked to abolish nuclear testing, to eliminate the university's ban on controversial speakers, and to improve undergraduate education at Cal. It developed a guide to classes and professors entitled the SLATE Supplement to the General Catalog, for which Freeman wrote reviews of professors and their courses.

One of SLATE's fundamental principles was that students should have the same rights to take stands on issues on campus that they had as citizens off campus. The university had restricted such activity since the 1930s. It became a major issue when the civil rights movement came to the Bay Area in the fall of 1963 because students wanted to support the movement on campus as well as off.

In the fall of 1964 the question was dramatized when student organizations set up tables on campus to solicit money and recruit students for off-campus political action in defiance of the ban. One person was arrested and several students were issued administrative citations. After a mass arrest was narrowly avoided by last minute negotiations with University president Clark Kerr, the Free Speech Movement (FSM) was formed by the student groups to continue the struggle. Freeman represented the University Young Democrats on the FSM executive committee. After two months of fruitless negotiations, Freeman was one of "the 800" students who were arrested for sitting in at the main administration building on December 2–3, 1964. This was the biggest mass arrest in California history. The publicity it generated compelled the regents of the university to change the rules so that students could pursue political issues on campus.

== Civil rights activist ==
When the civil rights movement came to the San Francisco Bay Area in 1963, it picketed local employers who didn't hire blacks. Demonstrations were organized at Lucky supermarket and Mel's Drive-In to get them to sign hiring agreements. Success here was followed by unsuccessful negotiations with San Francisco's most elegant hotels and several automobile dealers. Freeman was one of 167 demonstrators arrested at the Sheraton-Palace Hotel in March 1964, and one of 226 arrested at the Cadillac agency in April. She was acquitted in her first trial, and convicted in the second, resulting in a fifteen-day jail sentence.

Freeman's second trial kept her from taking part in the 1964 Freedom Summer project in Mississippi. In August, after it concluded, she hitchhiked to the 1964 Democratic National Convention in Atlantic City, New Jersey, in order to support the Mississippi Freedom Democratic Party's petition to be seated in place of the all-white regular Mississippi delegation. (That effort was not successful.)

Following graduation from UC Berkeley, Freeman joined the Southern Christian Leadership Conference's (SCLC) summer project, SCOPE (Southern Community Organization and Political Education). When the summer was over, she joined the SCLC staff as a field worker. For the next year she did voter registration in Alabama and Mississippi, spending a few days in jail in both states.

In August 1966, when she was working in Grenada, Mississippi, the Jackson Daily News published an exposé of her work as a "professional agitator" on its editorial page, implying that she was a communist sympathizer. The exposé was accompanied by five photographs, including one taken during the Free Speech Movement. Thirty years later a federal court order disclosed that these were provided to the newspaper by the Mississippi State Sovereignty Commission. An informant had documented Freeman's participation in the FSM and recognized her in Grenada. Concerned for her safety, SCLC sent Freeman back to Atlanta, where she worked in the main office and also as Coretta Scott King's assistant for six weeks.

In October Freeman was sent to work with SCLC's Chicago project. As the SCLC 's Chicago project faded out, Freeman went to work for a community newspaper, the West Side TORCH. When this job ended she tried to find jobs as a journalist and photographer in Chicago, where she was told that girls can't cover riots. Eventually she found work as a re-write editor for a trade magazine, later becoming a freelance writer.

== Women's liberation activism ==
In June 1967, Freeman attended a "free school" course on women at the University of Chicago led by Heather Booth and Naomi Weisstein. She invited them to organize a woman's workshop at the then-forthcoming National Conference of New Politics (NCNP), to be held over Labor Day weekend 1967 in Chicago. A woman's caucus led by Freeman and Shulamith Firestone was formed at that conference and tried to present its own demands to the plenary session. The women were told their resolution was not important enough for a floor discussion and when through threatening to tie up the convention with procedural motions they succeeded in having their statement tacked to the end of the agenda, it was never discussed.

When the National Conference for New Politics Director William F. Pepper refused to recognize any of the women waiting to speak and instead called on someone to speak about the American Indian, five women, including Firestone, rushed the podium to demand to know why. Pepper patted Firestone on the head and said, "Move on little girl; we have more important issues to talk about here than women's liberation," (Note: Women's liberation movement, a type of feminism) or possibly, "Cool down, little girl. We have more important things to talk about than women's problems."

Freeman and Firestone called a meeting of the women who had been at the "free school" course and the women's workshop at the conference — this became the first Chicago women's liberation group, known as the Westside group because it met weekly in Freeman's apartment on Chicago's west side. After a few months Freeman started the newsletter Voice of the women's liberation movement, editing the first issue. It circulated all over the country (and in a few foreign countries), and gave the new movement its name. Many of the women in the Westside group went on to start other feminist organizations including the Chicago Women's Liberation Union.

As a result of her publications, Freeman was invited to speak at many other colleges and universities, mostly in the Midwest. She spent the summers of 1970 and 1971 hitchhiking through Europe distributing feminist literature. Her lecture at the University of Oslo in 1970 is credited for sparking its first new feminist group. The literature she distributed was also a boon to feminists in the Netherlands.

Although Freeman had not been active in Democratic Party politics since leaving California in 1965 (except for a brief stint on Eugene McCarthy's 1968 Presidential campaign), she ran for delegate to the 1972 Democratic National Convention in order to put Shirley Chisholm's name on the ballot. She came in ninth out of 24 candidates in Chicago's first district and attended the convention as an alternate with the Chicago Challenge Delegation that unseated Mayor Daley's hand-picked slate. She later worked on California senator Alan Cranston's 1984 Presidential campaign and became active in Democratic Party politics in Brooklyn, New York.

In 1977, Freeman became an associate of the Women's Institute for Freedom of the Press (WIFP).

Freeman is featured in the feminist history film, She's Beautiful When She's Angry.

=== Groundbreaking feminist writings ===
Freeman wrote four classic feminist papers, under her movement pseudonym "Joreen", which analyzed her experiences in the women's liberation movement. The most widely known is "The Tyranny of Structurelessness," in which she argued that there is no such thing as a structureless group, that power is merely disguised and hidden when structure is unacknowledged, and that all groups and organizations need clear lines of responsibility for democratic accountability - a notion that underlies the theory of democratic structuring. "The 51 Percent Minority Group: A Statistical Essay" appeared in the 1970 anthology Sisterhood is Powerful: An Anthology of Writings From The Women's Liberation Movement, edited by Robin Morgan.

"The Bitch Manfesto", written in the fall of 1968, is considered an early example of linguistic reclamation by a social movement, as well as a celebration of non-traditional gender roles. In this piece, Freeman noted that women are labeled as "bitches" when they "transgress societal gender boundaries". She argued that women who are seen as "direct" or "demanding" are often considered "bitches", and asked women to embrace their "inner bitch", noting that it is difficult to make societal change without angering people. Freeman's 1976 article, "Trashing: The Dark Side of Sisterhood", illuminated an aspect of the women's movement that many participants experienced but few wanted to discuss openly.

Freeman's 1973 doctoral dissertation analyzed the two branches of the women's movement, arguing that they were separated more by generation and experience than by ideology. What she called the "younger branch" was started by women with experience in civil rights, anti-war, and New Left student activism. The "older branch" was founded by women who had been members of or worked with the President's Commission on the Status of Women and related state Commissions. The latter branch gave rise to such organizations as the National Organization for Women (NOW) and the Women's Equity Action League (WEAL). The resulting book, The Politics of Women's Liberation, was published in 1975 and won the American Political Science Association (APSA) prize for the best scholarly work on women in politics.

== Career in law and political science ==
Before receiving her PhD from the University of Chicago in 1973, Freeman taught for four years at the State University of New York. She then spent two years in Washington, D.C., as a fellow at the Brookings Institution and then as an APSA Congressional Fellow. With an increasing interest in public policy, and unable to find a full-time appointment in academia, Freeman decided to study law after she was offered a Root-Tilden Scholarship at New York University School of Law. She received a J.D. degree in 1982 and was admitted to the New York State Bar the next year. She maintained a private practice in Brooklyn, New York for many years, serving as counsel to women running for political offices and to pro-choice demonstrators.

Freeman has published 11 books and hundreds of articles. Most are on some aspect of women or feminism, but she also writes about social movements and political parties. Two of these are considered classics: "On the Origins of Social Movements" and "The Political Culture of the Democratic and Republican Parties." Women: A Feminist Perspective went into five editions and for many years was the leading introductory women's studies textbook. A Room at a Time: How Women Entered Party Politics (2000) also won a prize for scholarship given at the APSA.

She has continued to attend the major party political conventions, but as a journalist. Many of her articles are posted to her webpage, as are some of her photographs of political events and a small selection from her button collection.

== Books ==
- The Politics of Women's Liberation: A Case Study of an Emerging Social Movement and Its Relation to the Policy Process (Longman, 1975; iUniverse, 2000). ISBN 978-0-595-08899-7
- Women: A Feminist Perspective, editor (Mayfield, 1975, 1979, 1984, 1989, 1995). ISBN 1-55934-111-4
- Social Movements of the Sixties and Seventies, editor (Longman, 1983). ISBN 0-582-28091-5
- Waves of Protest: Social Movements Since the Sixties, editor with Victoria Johnson (Rowman & Littlefield, 1999). ISBN 0-8476-8747-3
- A Room at a Time: How Women Entered Party Politics (Rowman & Littlefield, 2000). ISBN 0-8476-9804-1
- At Berkeley in the Sixties: The Education of an Activist, 1961–1965 (Indiana University Press, 2004). ISBN 0-253-34283-X
- We Will Be Heard: Women's Struggles for Political Power in the United States (Rowman & Littlefield, 2008). ISBN 978-0-7425-5608-9
