= Stephen Dunifer =

American radio engineer

- Born: 1951 or 1952 (age 73–74)
- Occupations: Radio engineer, author
- Organization: Free Radio Berkeley
- Website: www.freeradio.org

Stephen Dunifer (born 1951/1952) is an American radio engineer, author and anarchist socialist who founded Free Radio Berkeley in 1993 Berkeley, California.

Free Radio Berkeley, an unlicensed micropower pirate radio station, was an expression of Dunifer's socialist anarchist principles, and was inspired by Black Liberation Radio in Springfield, Illinois and by Japanese micropower radio stations. Free Radio Berkeley was involved in a protracted legal case with the Federal Communications Commission in the mid-1990s. At the time, it was illegal to broadcast on less than 100 watts.

== Selected works ==
- Seizing the Airwaves: A Free Radio Handbook, 1998, ISBN 978-1-873176-99-3
