= Italian Institute of Human Sciences (SUM) =

- Type: Public
- Established: 2002
- Rector: Aldo Schiavone
- Location: Palazzo Strozzi, Florence, Florence, Italy

The Italian Institute of Human Sciences (Italian: Istituto Italiano di Scienze Umane), often shortened to SUM, was an Italian public university dedicated to post-graduate formation and high level research in human and social sciences, which operated from 2009 to 2013. Specifically, it promoted Doctoral, Post-Doctoral and Master programmes in collaboration with other Italian and European universities.

It was constituted by five schools and institutes within the universities of Florence, Bologna, Rome - La Sapienza, Milan - Bicocca, Siena, Naples - Federico II, Naples - Eastern and Naples - Suor Orsola Benincasa.

In association with the Central European University (CEU), the École des Hautes Études en Sciences Sociales (EHESS), the École Pratique des Hautes Études (EPHE), and the Humboldt Universität in Berlin, it established the European Doctoral School for the Human and Social Sciences.

It had cooperation and co-tutorship agreements with the École des Hautes Études en Sciences Sociales, the École Pratique des Hautes Études, New York University and Georgetown University.

With a ministerial decree of 2013, the Institute was deactivated and incorporated into the Scuola Normale Superiore of Pisa.

== Schools ==
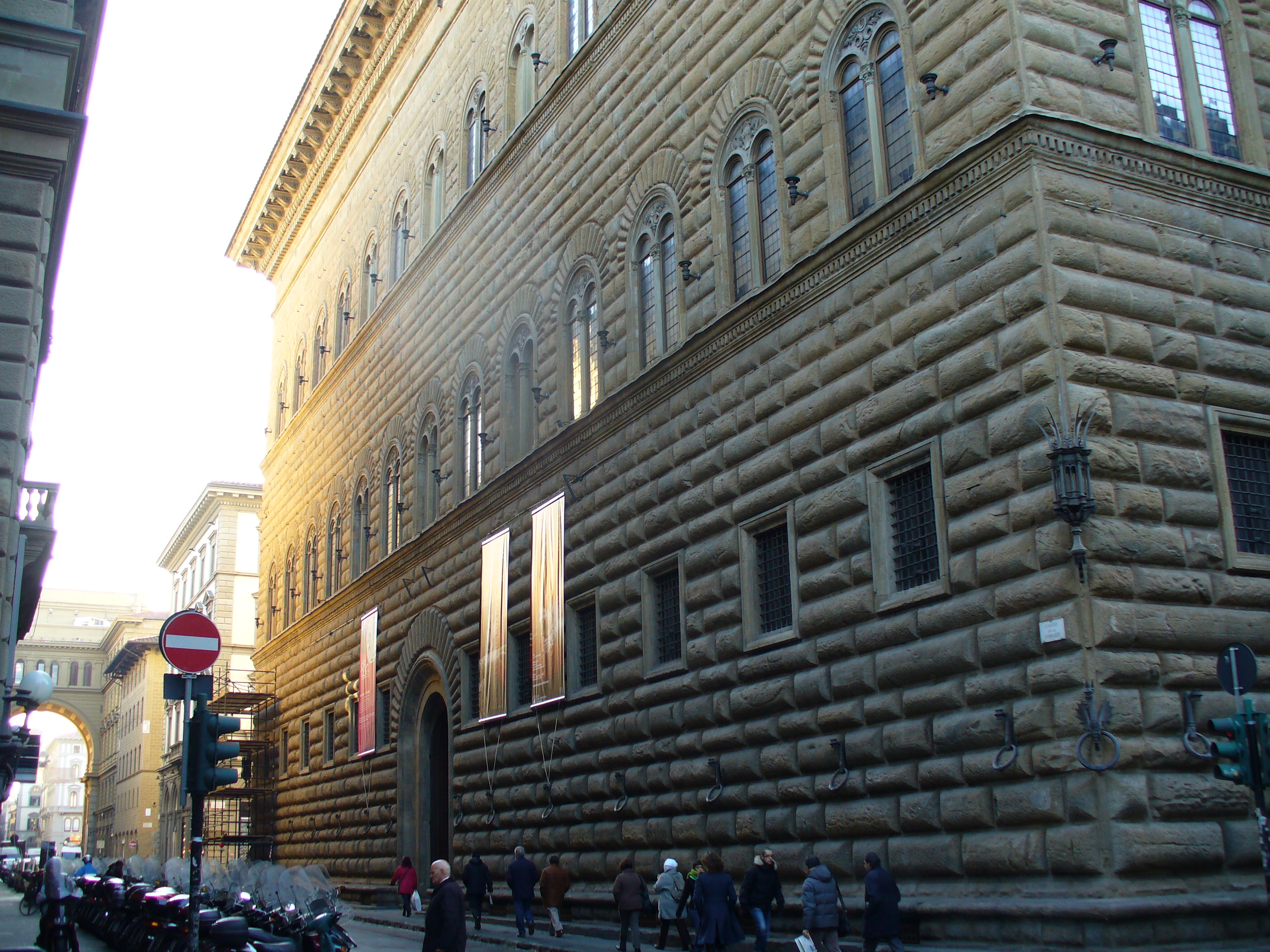
Palazzo Strozzi, seat of the institute in Florence

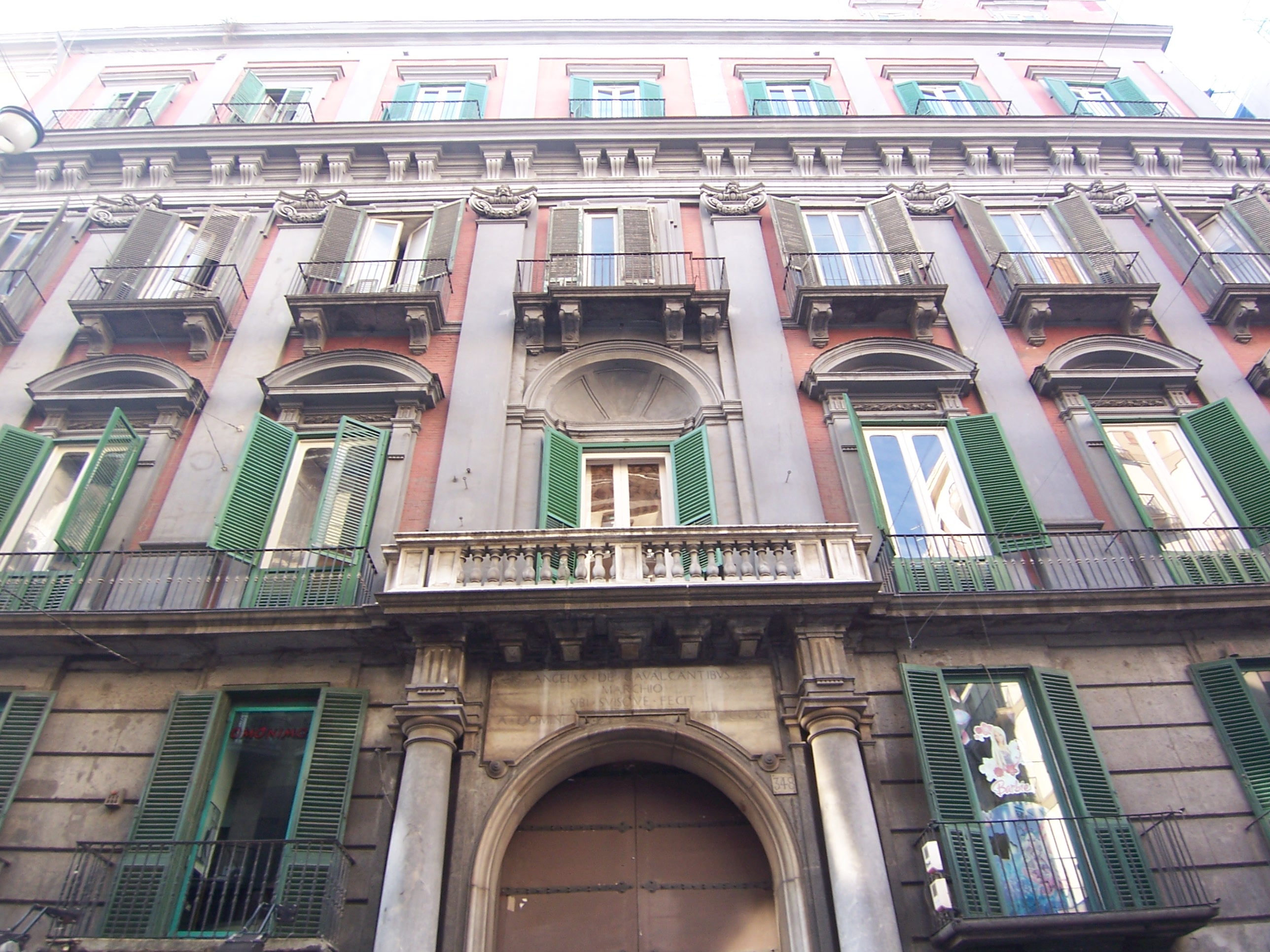
Palazzo Cavalcanti, seat of the institute in Naples

- Istituto di Studi Umanistici, University of Florence
- Scuola Superiore di Studi Umanistici, University of Bologna
- Scuola Superiore di Studi Umanistici, University of Siena
- Scuola di Alta Formazione nelle Scienze Umane e Sociali, University of Naples Federico II and Naples Eastern University
- Scuola Europea di Studi Avanzati, University of Naples - Suor Orsola Benincasa.
- European Doctoral School for the Human and Social Sciences, in association with the Central European University (CEU), the École des Hautes Études en Sciences Sociales (EHESS), the École Pratique des Hautes Études (EPHE) and the Humboldt Universität (HU).

== PhD Programmes ==
- Political Science
- History of Ideas, Philosophy and Science
- Ethics and History of Philosophy
- Anthropology, History and Philosophy of Culture
- Law and Economy
- Theoretical and Political Philosophy
- Philology, history of the Italian language and literature
- Juridical Science and Theory of the Law
- Philosophy of History
- European literature and culture
- Semiotics
- Europe and the invention of modernity
- Studies over the visible representation: history, theory and production of arts and images
- Sociology
- History of the International Relations
- Contemporary History
- Ancient, Medieval and Enlightenment Studies
- Modern and Contemporary Philosophy
- Geopolitics and culture of the Mediterranean
- Linguistics and history of the linguistic thought
- Contemporary History and Society
- Universalization of the juridical systems: history and theory

== European PhD programmes ==
- History

curricula:

- Europe and the invention of modernity
- Comparative history of knowledge
- The Classic tradition and its mediations in the Christian, Jewish and Muslim worlds
- Social Science

curricula:

- Europe in the context of globalization
- The social and political bases of Europe
- The social sciences of religions
