= Live in Paris and Toronto =

Live album by Loreena McKennitt
- Released: May 20, 1999
- Recorded: April 19, 1998 Paris Disc (Salle Pleyel) and May 3–4, 1998 Toronto Disc (Massey Hall)
- Genre: Folk, world music
- Length: 1:37:24 (97:24)
- Label: Quinlan Road

Loreena McKennitt chronology
The Book of Secrets (1997)	Live in Paris and Toronto (1999)	An Ancient Muse (2006)

Professional ratings
Review scores
Source	Rating
Allmusic	link

Live in Paris and Toronto is a two CD live album by Loreena McKennitt, released in 1999. Disc one is a live performance of the studio album The Book of Secrets; disc two features songs from her albums The Visit and The Mask and Mirror.

== Track listing ==
Disc one

1. "Prologue" – 5:00
2. "The Mummers' Dance" – 3:54
3. "Skellig" – 5:24
4. "Marco Polo" – 4:35
5. "The Highwayman" – 9:19
6. "La Serenissima" – 5:55
7. "Night Ride Across the Caucasus" – 6:22
8. "Dante's Prayer" 5:25

Disc two

1. "The Mystic's Dream" – 6:29
2. "Santiago" – 5:32
3. "Bonny Portmore" – 3:50
4. "Between the Shadows" – 4:18
5. "The Lady of Shalott" – 9:05
6. "The Bonny Swans" – 6:33
7. "The Old Ways" – 5:03
8. "All Souls Night" – 4:13
9. "Cymbeline" – 6:27

== Personnel ==
- Loreena McKennitt – vocals, piano, accordion, keyboards, harp
- Nigel Eaton – hurdy-gurdy
- Brian Hughes – guitars, oud, bouzouki, keyboards
- Caroline Lavelle – cello
- Rick Lazar – percussion
- Hugh Marsh – violin
- Rob Piltch – guitars, keyboards
- Donald Quan – keyboards
- Danny Thompson – acoustic bass
