= Nights from the Alhambra =

Live album by Loreena McKennitt
- Released: August 21, 2007
- Recorded: September 13–15, 2006
- Venue: Palace of Charles V, in the Alhambra (Granada, Spain)
- Genre: Folk, world music
- Length: 94:47 (CD)
- Label: Quinlan Road, Verve

Loreena McKennitt chronology
An Ancient Muse (2006)	Nights from the Alhambra (2007)	A Midwinter Night's Dream (2008)

Professional ratings
Review scores
Source	Rating
Allmusic	4/5 stars

Nights from the Alhambra is a live album and DVD from the Canadian singer, songwriter, accordionist, harpist, and pianist, Loreena McKennitt and is her first live concert DVD. It was recorded in September 2006, live at the Palace of Charles V, in the Alhambra, Granada, Spain, and released commercially in September 2007.

== Track listing ==
Disk 1

1. "The Mystic's Dream" (The Mask and Mirror)
2. "She Moved Through the Fair" (Elemental)
3. "Stolen Child" (Elemental)
4. "The Mummers' Dance" (The Book of Secrets)
5. "Penelope's Song" (An Ancient Muse)
6. "Marco Polo" (The Book of Secrets)
7. "The Bonny Swans" (The Mask and Mirror)
8. "Dante's Prayer" (The Book of Secrets)
9. "Caravanserai" (An Ancient Muse)

Disk 2

1. "Bonny Portmore" (The Visit)
2. "Santiago" (The Mask and Mirror)
3. "Raglan Road" (An Ancient Muse - unreleased track)
4. "All Souls Night" (The Visit)
5. "The Lady of Shalott" (The Visit)
6. "The Old Ways" (The Visit)
7. "Never-Ending Road (Amhrán Duit)" (An Ancient Muse)
8. "Huron `Beltane` Fire Dance" (Parallel Dreams)
9. "Cymbeline" (The Visit)
- The DVD track listing is the same except that all the songs are on the same disc. The DVD also includes McKennitt's spoken introductions to songs, which are omitted from the CDs.

== Personnel ==
- Tal Bergman: drums and percussion
- Panos Dimitrakopoulos: kanoun
- Nigel Eaton: hurdy-gurdy
- Steáfán Hannigan: Uilleann pipes, bodhrán, percussion
- Brian Hughes: band leader, electric and acoustic guitars, oud, Celtic bouzouki
- Caroline Lavelle: cello
- Rick Lazar: percussion
- Hugh Marsh: violin
- Tim Landers: acoustic and electric bass
- Loreena McKennitt: vocals, accordion, harp, piano
- Donald Quan: viola, keyboards, tabla
- Sokratis Sinopoulos: lyra
- Haig Yazdjian: oud
- Julia Knowles: Director
- Mark Cunniffe: Lighting Director
- Su Hutchinson: Producer
- Mark McCauley: Assistant to Loreena McKennitt

== Certifications ==
Region	Certification	Certified units/sales
Australia (ARIA)	Gold	35,000^{^}
^{^} Shipments figures based on certification alone.
