= A Midwinter Night's Dream =

Studio album by Loreena McKennitt
- Released: October 28, 2008
- Recorded: 1995, June 15-25, 2008
- Genre: Christmas; Celtic; worldbeat
- Length: 54:29
- Label: Quinlan Road, Universal
- Producer: Loreena McKennitt

Loreena McKennitt chronology
Nights from the Alhambra (2007)	A Midwinter Night's Dream (2008)	A Mediterranean Odyssey (2009)

Professional ratings
Review scores
Source	Rating
Allmusic	link
About.com	link

A Midwinter Night's Dream is the eighth studio album by the Canadian singer, songwriter, accordionist, harpist, and pianist Loreena McKennitt, released on October 28, 2008.

== Origins ==
The album is an extended version of A Winter Garden: Five Songs for the Season (1995). 8 new tracks (recorded at Peter Gabriel's Real World Studios during spring 2008) were added to the original 5 songs of the 1995 EP.

A Midwinter Night's Dream takes the place of A Winter Garden, which has been deleted from the Quinlan Road catalogue.

== Track listing ==
1. "The Holly & the Ivy" (traditional, music by McKennitt) – 4:49
2. "Un flambeau, Jeannette, Isabelle" (traditional) – 3:06
3. "The Seven Rejoices of Mary" (traditional) – 4:34
4. "Noël Nouvelet!" (traditional) – 5:11
5. "Good King Wenceslas" (John Mason Neale) – 3:16
6. "Coventry Carol" (traditional, music arranged & adapted by McKennitt) – 2:18
7. "God Rest Ye Merry, Gentlemen" (Abdelli version) (traditional, music arranged and adapted by McKennitt) – 7:19
8. "Snow" (lyrics by Archibald Lampman, music by McKennitt) – 5:05
9. "Breton Carol" (traditional) – 3:30
10. "Seeds of Love" (traditional, music by McKennitt) – 4:54
11. "Gloucestershire Wassail" (traditional) – 2:39
12. "Emmanuel" (traditional) – 4:55
13. "In the Bleak Midwinter" (Gustav Holst) – 2:43

== Charts ==
Chart (2008)	Peak position
Austria Albums Chart	75
Belgium Albums Chart	42
Canadian Albums Chart	12
Dutch Albums Chart	77
France Albums Chart	57
Germany Albums Chart	27
Italian Albums Chart	46
Spain Albums Chart	38
Swiss Albums Chart	63
US Billboard 200	140
US World Albums	1
US Holiday Albums	16

== Personnel ==
- Loreena McKennitt – vocals, piano, accordion and harp
- Brian Hughes – oud and guitar
- Hugh Marsh – violin
- Caroline Lavelle – cello
- Donald Quan – viola and percussion
- Ben Grossman – hurdy-gurdy and percussion
- Simon Edwards – bass
- Rick Lazar – percussion
- Stratis Psaradellis – Greek lyra and Greek lute
