= Caroline Lavelle =

English musician

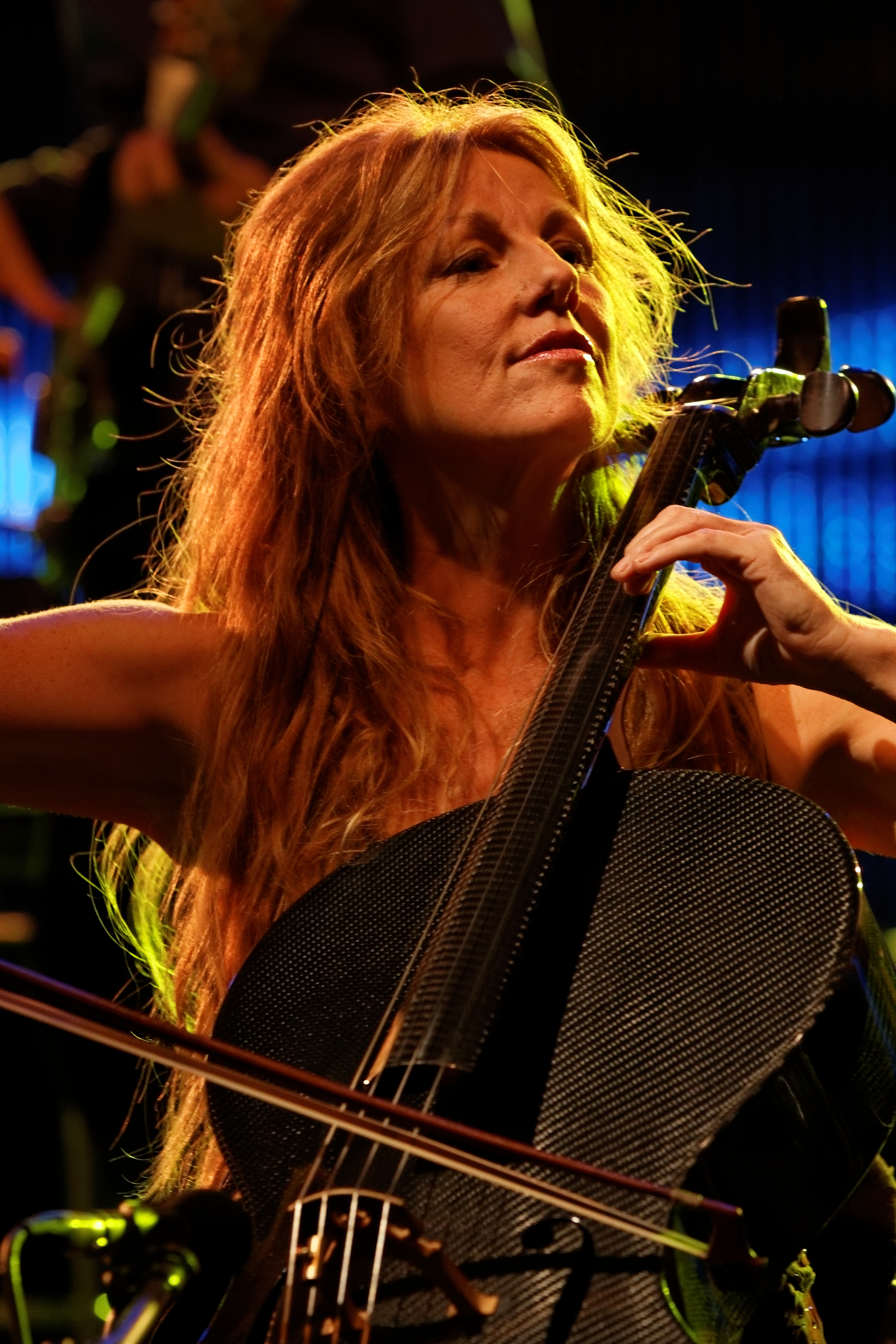
- Caroline Lavelle (2012)

Background information
- Genres: Pop rock, alternative rock, folk
- Occupations: Musician, songwriter
- Instruments: Cello, vocals
- Website: CarolineLavelle.com

Caroline Lavelle is an English singer-songwriter and cellist who has created three solo albums and contributed vocals, music, and production help to many other artists and bands.

== Career ==
Lavelle studied at the Royal College of Music in London. Throughout the early to mid-eighties she busked in the city, often outside Kensington Tube Station and Covent Garden, playing baroque music with Anne Stephenson and Virginia Astley (or Virginia Hewes; sources are confused) in a group called Humouresque.

She was spotted by Frankie Gavin, a member of Ireland's De Dannan band, who asked her to join. She was part of the band up to the early nineties, alongside Mary Black and Dolores Keane.

In 1992, she contributed vocals and cello to the track "Home of the Whale" on the Massive Attack EP Hymn of the Big Wheel. Producer William Orbit liked it, contacted her, and eventually produced, and mixed, her debut solo album, Spirit, in 1995. Her version of the song "Moorlough Shore" was used for the introduction to Paul Haggis's critically acclaimed crime drama EZ Streets. This brought her greater notice in the areas of film and television. Also in 1995, she began recording with Canadian world music artist Loreena McKennitt, recording and touring as part of McKennitt's band.

A December 1999 article in The Sunday Times reported that it was this album which drew Madonna's attention and initiated the successful collaboration of William Orbit and Madonna.

She produced two further albums, Brilliant Midnight (2001), which, a year later, had three further tracks added in a reissue, and A Distant Bell in (2004).

Her "Home of the Whale" track (with Massive Attack) was featured in the 2000 Ewan McGregor/Ashley Judd film, Eye of the Beholder, and she also contributed her song Anxiety to the soundtrack of the 2001 John Dahl movie Roadkill (Joyride in the US).

She lives in Tintagel in Cornwall. She was on Loreena McKennitt's Ancient Muse tour. In early 2013, Lavelle began work on a new collaborative project with singer/songwriter Andrew Bate.

In 2016, she released an album titled Secret Sky as one of a trio by the same name. The other members are Brian Hughes and Hugh Marsh. In 2023, Secret Sky released a second album, Opium.

== Collaborations ==
| Artist | Opus | Year | Contribution | Song |
|---|---|---|---|---|
| Siouxsie And The Banshees | A Kiss In The Dreamhouse | 1982 | Cello | "Obsession" |
| Tones On Tail | Performance 7" and 12" | 1984 | Cello | "Performance" |
| The Durutti Column | Without Mercy | 1984 | Cello | All |
| Modern English (band) | Ricochet Days | 1984 | Cello | All |
| Art of Trance | Voice of Earth | 1999 | Vocals & lyrics | "Breathe" |
| Afro Celt Sound System | Sound Magic Volume 1 | 1995 | Cello, vocals & giggling | Jam Nation's "She Moved Through the Fair" |
| All About Eve | Scarlet and Other Stories | 1989 | Cello | "Gold and Silver" "Tuesday's Child" |
| BT | Emotional Technology | 2003 | Cello & vocals | "The Great Escape" |
| Chicane | Far from the Maddening Crowds | 1997 | Vocals & co-writing | "Lost You Somewhere" |
| De Dannan | Ballroom | 1987 | Cello, vocals & other arrangements | All |
| Electric Strings Quartet with The Pogues | Pogue Mahone | 1996 | Cello | "Anniversary" "Love You 'Til the End" "Pont Mirabeau" |
| Fun Boy Three | Waiting | 1983 | Cello | All |
| Hector Zazou | Lights in the Dark; Strong Currents; L'Absence | 1998; 2003; 2004 | Cello; Vocals & lyrics Vocals & lyrics | All "The Freeze" "Lies Will Flow" |
| Loreena McKennitt | A Winter Garden; The Book of Secrets; Live Paris & Toronto; An Ancient Muse; Nights from the Alhambra; A Midwinter Night's Dream; A Mediterranean Odyssey; The Wind That Shakes the Barley; Troubadours on the Rhine; The Journey So Far + A Midsummer Night's Tour; Lost Souls; The Visit - The Definitive Edition | 1995; 1997; 1999; 2006; 2007; 2008; 2009; 2010; 2012; 2014; 2018; 2021 | Cello; Cello; Cello; Cello; Cello; Cello; Cello; Cello; Cello; Cello & backing vocals Cello, concertina & recorder Cello & background vocals | All except tracks 1 & 3 All except tracks 1, 3, 4, 6 & 7 All; All except tracks 1 & 4 All; All except tracks 5, 6 & 11; All except CD1 track 4 and CD2 tracks 1, 2, 6, 7 & 9 All except track 9 All; All except CD1 tracks 1, 2, 3, 5, 6, 7, 8, 10 & 11; All; CD4 tracks 10, 11, 12, 13, 14 & 15 |
| Mary Black | No Frontiers | 1989 | Cello | "The Shadow" "Columbus" |
| Massive Attack | Hymn of the Big Wheel EP | 1992 | Vocals & cello | "Home of the Whale" |
| Muse | Origin of Symmetry | 2001 | Cello | "Megalomania" "Citizen Erased" |
| Nigel Kennedy | Kafka | 1996 | Vocals & co-writing | "Breathing Stone" |
| Peter Gabriel | Us | 1992 | Cello | "Love to Be Loved" "Washing of the Water" "Secret World" |
| Radiohead | The Bends | 1995 | Cello | "Fake Plastic Trees" "Nice Dream" |
| Sleepthief | The Dawnseeker; Labyrinthine Heart; Mortal Longing | 2006; 2009; 2018 | Vocals & writing | "Nightjar" "Rainy World" "Asleep in Metropolis" |
| Tarja Turunen | Colours in the Dark | 2013 | Cello | "Deliverance" "Until Silence" |
| The Chieftains | Further Down the Old Plank Road | 2003 | Cello | "The Raggle Taggle Gypsy" "The Lily of the West" |
| The Undertones | The Sin of Pride | 1983 | Cello | "Valentine's Treatment" "Luxury" |
| Vangelis | Voices | 1995 | Vocals & lyrics | "Come to Me" |
| Tanger | La Mémoire Insoluble | 1998 | Cello | All |
| Thomas Dolby | Forty | 2001 | Cello & background vocals | "I Love You Goodbye" "My Brain Is Like a Sieve" "Hyperactive!" |

She has also worked with The Durutti Column, The Pogues, Laurie Anderson, The Waterboys, Siouxsie and the Banshees, Graham Parker, The Cranberries, Ryuichi Sakamoto and Radiohead. Art of Trance has remixed some of her songs.

== Discography ==
=== Albums ===
- Spirit (1995)
1. "Turning Ground"
2. "Moorlough Shore"
3. "Dream of Picasso"
4. "Forget the Few"
5. "Lagan Love"
6. "A Case of You"
7. "Waiting for Rain"
8. "Desire"
9. "The Island"
10. "Sleep Now"
11. "Sheherezade"
- Brilliant Midnight (2001)
1. "Farther than the Sun"
2. "Anxiety"
3. "Anima Rising"
4. "She Said"
5. "All I Have"
6. "The Fall"
7. "Siamant'o"
8. "Karma"
9. "Mangoes"
10. "Le Pourquoi"
11. "Firefly Night"
12. "Universal"
13. "Twisted Ends"
- Brilliant Midnight 2.0 (2002)

(As above, but with 3 extra tracks):

1. "Lost Voices"
2. "Home of the Whale"
3. "The First Time Ever I Saw Your Face"
- A Distant Bell (2004)
1. "Gently Johnny"
2. "So Uncool"
3. "Innocence Sleeping"
4. "Banks of the Nile"
5. "Simple Lyric"
6. "No More Words"
7. "Too Late"
8. "The Trees They Do Grow High"
9. "Greenwood Laddie"
10. "Timeless"
11. "Handful of Ashes"
12. "Farewell to Music (w. Paddy Moloney of The Chieftains)"
13. "Gently Johnny (Extended Version)"

=== Singles ===
Moorlough Shore
N-Gram Recordings (1995)

1. "Moorlough Shore" (LP Mix) – 4.20
2. "Moorlough Shore" (Eye of the Storm Mix) – 5.39
3. "Moorlough Shore" (Thermionic Resonance Mix), 90 BPM, vocal – 5.30
4. "Moorlough Shore" (Thermionic Resonance Mix), 97 BPM, dub – 5.22
5. "Moorlough Shore" (Thermionic Resonance Mix), 90 BPM, dub – 5.47
6. "Moorlough Shore" (Thermionic Resonance Mix), 107 BPM, dub – 5.45

A Case of You
N-Gram Recordings (1995)

1. "A Case of You" (Single Mix) – 4.30
2. "Dream of Picasso" (Monka Monka Mix) – 6.53
3. "A Case of You" (Psovi Psovi Mix) – 4.31
