= Urumi (soundtrack) =

Soundtrack album by Deepak Dev
- Released: 7 March 2011
- Recorded: July–December 2010
- Genre: Feature film soundtrack
- Length: 33:44
- Language: Malayalam
- Label: Manorama Music
- Producer: Deepak Dev

Deepak Dev chronology
Christian Brothers (2011)	Urumi (2011)	Teja Bhai & Family (2011)

Urumi is the soundtrack to the 2011 Malayalam-language epic historical drama film of the same name directed by Santosh Sivan. The music is composed by Deepak Dev whose soundtrack featured lyrics written by Kaithapram Damodaran Namboothiri, Rafeeq Ahamed and Engandiyur Chandrasekharan. Vairamuthu wrote the Tamil lyrics for the songs whereas Ramajogayya Sastry, Chandrabose, Bhuvana Chandra, Vennelakanti and Rakhi were the lyricists for the Telugu-dubbed versions.

The soundtrack featured nine songs, ranging from a variety of genres and composed predominantly with the use of earthy and organic and instrumentation and devoid of electronic music, which Dev did in the past. Along with K. J. Yesudas, Shweta Mohan, Manjari and Prithviraj himself providing vocals, the soundtrack also marked the debut of Resmi Sateesh, K. R. Renji (his first and only film song till date) and Kannada film composer Gurukiran; with the former, Job Kurian also made his breakthrough with the film, contributing for several Malayalam films.

Urumi's soundtrack was launched by Manorama Music on 7 March 2011 with the Telugu- and Tamil-dubbed versions of the album released through Aditya Music and Sony Music in the latter half of the year. The English version of the film had its songs being excluded to suit the international sensibilities, although a score album is expected to be released. The music and score was positively received by critics, and Dev won Kerala State Film Award for Best Music Director (Score) and a nomination for Filmfare Award for Best Music Director.

== Development ==
The lead actor and producer of the film, Prithviraj Sukumaran suggested Dev's name to Sivan, as he had worked with the latter in Puthiya Mukham (2009). One of the film's producers, Shaji Nateshan formally met Dev regarding that Sivan asked him to meet for a film. Dev felt it as "dream come true" moment as he always wanted to work on Sivan's film (either as a director or cinematographer) or his assistants. Since the film was set in the 16th century, Sivan had proscribed all electronic music elements, which meant that Dev had to explore and reinvent the musical vocabulary; he did not use the piano for the film, abiding Sivan's suggestions. Being a multilingual, Sivan further suggested him to have the music being earthy and organic but also has a pan-Indian appeal and should sound good and sensible too. Hence, he further played the music with the lyrics in Tamil and Hindi and ensure that it should not be overtly regionalized.

Urumi features nine songs, each one of them being completely different and encompassed many genres, ranging from folk, lullaby and ballad. Hence each song needed a different voice and feel, and also flow within the narrative. Each song begins with the word which had been repeated for effect. The contributing singers ranged from prominent names to newcomers as well as fellow music directors and actors. The music was recorded within six months—July to late-December 2010.

== Songs ==
K. J. Yesudas and Shweta Mohan recorded the song "Aaro Nee Aaro", the first time they are collaborating for a duet. The song "Chimmi Chimmi", sung by Manjari is a tribute to composer M. G. Radhakrishnan, whom Dev is said to have admired. The song "Aarane Aarane" is sung by Job Kurian and Rita Thyagarajan. Dev recalled that when he was the judge at the Malayalam music-based reality show Super Star, where Kurian was a contestant, he promised him that he would rope him as a singer for one his compositions. On his inclusion in the track, he felt that Kurian's voice would be utilized well. Resmi Sateesh made her debut as a playback singer, recording two songs "Chalanam Chalanam" and "Appaa". The former was picturised on Vidya Balan, where Dev felt that her voice had a "rustic, raw edge" that is scaled from several pitches suiting the scene, while the latter is a lullaby number that she sang accompanying with the santoor.

K. R. Renji debuted with the patriotic number "Thelu Thelu"; Though Dev did not formally meet the singer, he sent the track to Thrissur, where the singer hailed from but later discovered that he had never recorded a song in a studio, and doing so would affect his "natural, full-throated rendering". He then recorded his voice live and arranged the music around his vocals. "Vadakku Vadakku" is a friendship song picturised on Prithviraj and Prabhu Deva. For the song, Dev brought Kannada music composer Gurukiran and fellow composer Shaan Rahman; the former was brought for Deva's voice as he speaks with a Tamil accent in the film. The song was reworked as a rock number which was sung by Prithviraj himself.

Renji, Gurukiran, Satheesh, Mohan and Thyagarajan retained their vocals for the Tamil version of the songs as "Thennadu", "Vadakka Vadakka", "Aaraaro Aaro" and the female vocals of "Kondaadu Kondaadu" and "Yaaro Nee Yaaro", while Malgudi Subha replaced Satheesh's vocals for the song "Chalanam Chalanam", Shreya Ghoshal sang "Chinna Chinna" (Tamil version of "Chimmi Chimmi") replacing Manjari, Hariharan and Benny Dayal, respectively replaced Yesudas' and Kurian's vocals for the songs "Kondaadu Kondaadu" and "Yaaro Nee Yaaro". The Telugu-dubbed version's soundtrack utilizes different singers, thereby not retaining the original counterparts.

== Release ==
Urumi's soundtrack was published by Manorama Music at an audio launch event held in Thiruvananthapuram on 7 March 2011. The Telugu version of the film's soundtrack was launched on 1 August 2011 at another event held in Hyderabad with the presence of the cast and Aditya Music distributed the audio CDs as well as launching it on digital stores. The Tamil version of the soundtrack was distributed by Sony Music and its album was released on 30 November 2011 at another event with the cast, excluding Prithviraj who was shooting for Masters (2012), instead his mother Mallika Sukumaran attended on his behalf. Vijay, Arvind Swamy, Mani Ratnam, A. R. Murugadoss and S. J. Suryah served as the chief guests for the event.

== Track listing ==
=== Malayalam ===
No.	Title	Lyrics	Artist(s)	Length
1.	"Aaranne Aarane"	Engandiyur Chandrasekharan	Job Kurian, Rita	4:19
2.	"Aaro Nee Aaro"	Kaithapram Damodaran Namboothiri	K. J. Yesudas, Shweta Mohan	6:21
3.	"Chimmi Chimmi"	Engandiyur Chandrasekharan	Manjari	2:43
4.	"Appaa"	Engandiyur Chandrasekharan	Reshmi Sathish	3:20
5.	"Vadakku Vadakku" (Friendship Remix)	Rafeeq Ahamed	Gurukiran, Shaan Rahman	2:51
6.	"Thelu Thele"	Engandiyur Chandrasekharan	K. R. Renji	3:52
7.	"Vadakku Vadakku" (Rock Mix)	Kaithapram Damodaran Namboothiri	Prithviraj Sukumaran	3:27
8.	"Chalanam Chalanam"	Engandiyur Chandrasekharan	Reshmi Sathish	3:45
9.	"Theme Music"	—	Mili	3:06
Total length:				33:44

=== Tamil ===
All lyrics are written by Vairamuthu.

No.	Title	Artist(s)	Length
1.	"Kondaadu Kondaadu"	Benny Dayal, Rita	4:20
2.	"Yaaro Nee Yaaro"	Hariharan, Shweta Mohan	6:03
3.	"Chinna Chinna"	Shreya Ghoshal	2:43
4.	"Aaraaro Aaro"	Resmi Sateesh	3:21
5.	"Vadakka Vadakka" (Friendship Remix)	Gurukiran	2:52
6.	"Thennadu"	K. R. Renji	3:52
7.	"Chalanam Chalanam"	Malgudi Subha	3:43
8.	"Urumi Theme"	Mili	3:06
9.	"Facing the Enemy"	Instrumental	2:25
10.	"Vadakka Vadakka" (Rock Mix)	Gurukiran	3:31
11.	"Thennadu" (Lounge Mix)	Sreerama Chandra	3:14
12.	"Yaaro Nee Yaaro"	Instrumental	6:01
Total length:			45:11

=== Telugu ===
No.	Title	Lyrics	Artist(s)	Length
1.	"Evvade Evvade"	Chandrabose	Vedala Hemachandra, Bhargavi, Sridhar	4:16
2.	"Neevevaro Chelimivo"	Ramajogayya Sastry	Karthik, Chinmayi Sripaada	6:02
3.	"Ee Laali"	Vennelakanti	Kavitha	3:20
4.	"Chinna Chinna"	Rakhi	Veena Ghantasala	2:40
5.	"Padara Padaraa"	Rakhi	Muralidhar, Rakhi	2:47
6.	"Kadanam Kadanam"	Vennelakanti	Aishwarya Bharani	3:43
7.	"Vikasinche"	Bhuvana Chandra	Saketh	3:47
8.	"Padara Padaraa" (Rock Mix)	Rakhi	Rakhi	3:24
9.	"Urumi Theme Music"	—	Mili	3:03
Total length:				33:02

== Reception ==
Critic based at IndiaGlitz summarised that the film's music "is targeted mostly towards class audiences who demand quality music with soulful experience. A definite collector's edition with ensemble music tracks, it will garner colossal critical acclaim from all sections of the media and the critics." Vipin Nair of Music Aloud gave 8 out of 10, saying "Deepak Dev produces a score quite expected from a movie like Urumi, barring the one surprise inclusion called Vadakku Vadakku. Job well done!" Karthik Srinivasan of Milliblog wrote "Urumi’s soundtrack is a good listen, but it is also a strangely predictable package."

The Times of India-based critic called "Yaaro Nee Yaaro" and theme song were Dev's best in compositions. Dhanush S Nair of The Hindu found the music to be "engaging and suits brilliantly with the mood of the movie". Mahesh K. of 123Telugu felt the music "provides a rich backdrop for the movie". Critic based at Behindwoods wrote "Deepak Dev’s songs are hummable and his background score is muted, suited for the setting of the film."

== Plagiarism accusations ==
The song "Aaro Nee Aaro" was alleged to be plagiarised from Loreena McKennitt's "Caravanserai" of the album An Ancient Muse and the hook lines lines from "The Mummers' Dance". McKennit filed a lawsuit against composer Deepak Dev and the makers of Urumi in Delhi High Court regarding copyright infringement. On 21 September 2011, Justice Manmohan Singh passed an order on a copyright that prevented the makers from releasing the film's music in English, Hindi, and Tamil, although the Tamil version's music was released in late-November. Since the producers failed to appear in court, judge Hema Kohli passed an arrest warrant against actor Prithviraj, Santhosh Sivan and Shaji Natesan.

== Accolades ==
Award	Category	Recipient(s)	Result	Ref.
Filmfare Awards South	Best Music Director – Malayalam	Deepak Dev	Nominated	
Filmfare Awards South	Best Female Playback Singer – Malayalam	Manjari – ("Chimmi Chimmi")	Nominated	
Kerala State Film Awards	Best Background Music	Deepak Dev	Won	
Mirchi Music Awards South	Listener's Choice Award − Album	Urumi	Won (5th place)	
Vanitha Film Awards	Best Female Playback Singer	Manjari – ("Chimmi Chimmi")	Won	
