= An Ancient Muse =

Studio album by Loreena McKennitt
- Released: November 20, 2006
- Recorded: June 2005–August 2006
- Genres: World music, folk
- Length: 54:19
- Labels: Quinlan Road, MRA
- Producer: Loreena McKennitt

Loreena McKennitt chronology
| Live in Paris and Toronto (1999) | An Ancient Muse (2006) | Nights from the Alhambra (2007) |

Professional ratings
Review scores
| Source | Rating |
|---|---|
| About.com | 4.5/5 stars |
| Allmusic | 3.5/5 stars |

An Ancient Muse is the seventh studio album of the Canadian singer, songwriter, accordionist, harpist, and pianist, Loreena McKennitt. It was released on November 20, 2006, internationally, and November 21, 2006, in the United States and Canada. It was her first studio album after a 9-year gap. It has sold over a half a million copies worldwide since its release.

== Overview ==
Work on An Ancient Muse started in 2005. According to reports on McKennitt's Quinlan Road website, most of the inspiration for the tracks of the album came from the music of Greece, Turkey, the Middle East and the Far East. Most of the tracks, with the exception of three revealed at the mid-September concerts in the Alhambra of Granada in Spain, were completely unknown until the release.

An Ancient Muse debuted on the U.S. Billboard 200 at number 83, with about 19,000 copies sold in its first week. This was also its peak position on the chart.

== Track listing ==
All music and lyrics written by Loreena McKennitt except as noted.

1. "Incantation" – 2:35
2. "The Gates of Istanbul" – 6:59
3. "Caravanserai" – 7:36
4. "The English Ladye and the Knight" (lyrics by Sir Walter Scott) – 6:49
5. "Kecharitomene" – 6:34
6. "Penelope's Song" – 4:21
7. "Sacred Shabbat" (Kâtibim arr. Loreena McKennitt) – 3:59
8. "Beneath a Phrygian Sky" – 9:32
9. "Never-ending Road (Amhrán Duit)" – 5:54

Bonus tracks

1. "Raglan Road" – 6:12 – an unreleased track on a bonus disc exclusive to Barnes & Noble
2. "Beneath a Phrygian Sky" (Gordian version) – 9:25 – exclusive iTunes Store remix

== Personnel ==
- Tal Bergman – drums (2, 3), percussion (5, 8)
- Stuart Bruce – vocal drone (1, 8), percussion (5)
- Clive Deamer – drums (8)
- Panos Dimitrakopoulos – kanoun (2, 3, 5, 7, 9)
- Nigel Eaton – hurdy-gurdy (3, 5)
- Ben Grossman – hurdy-gurdy (5)
- Ed Hanley – tabla (5), udu drum (5)
- Jason Hann – percussion (8)
- Steáfán Hannigan – Turkish clarinet (1, 5, 8), vocal drone (1, 8), uilleann pipes (8, 9)
- Brian Hughes – electric guitar (1, 2, 3, 5, 8, 9), guitar synthesizer (1, 2, 3, 5, 8, 9), vocal drone (1, 8), oud (2, 3, 5), Celtic bouzouki (2, 3, 5, 8), nylon string guitar (5, 8, 9)
- Charlie Jones: acoustic bass (5, 6)
- Manu Katché – drums (5)
- Georgios Kontogiannis – Greek bouzouki (2, 3)
- Tim Landers – bass (2, 3, 8)
- Caroline Lavelle – cello (2, 3, 5, 6, 7, 8, 9)
- Rick Lazar – percussion (1, 5, 8)
- Annbjørg Lien – nyckelharpa (6)
- Hugh Marsh – violin (3, 5, 6)
- Loreena McKennitt – vocals (1, 2, 3, 4, 6, 8, 9), keyboards (1, 2, 3, 4, 5, 6, 7, 8, 9), accordion (3), harp (4), percussion (5), piano (8)
- Marco Migliari – vocal drone (1, 8)
- Donald Quan – viola (1, 2, 3, 5, 6, 8, 9), vocal drone (1, 8)
- Hossam Ramzy – percussion (2, 5)
- Sokratis Sinopoulos – lyra (2, 3, 7, 8)
- Haig Yazdjian – oud (2, 3, 5, 6, 7)
- Choristers of Westminster Abbey; Alex Pott, Elliot Thompson and Nicholas Morris – vocals (4)

== Chart performance ==
| Chart (2006) | Peak position |
|---|---|
| Austria Albums Chart | 59 |
| Belgium Albums Chart | 46 |
| Canadian Albums Chart | 9 |
| Danish Albums Chart | 25 |
| Dutch Albums Chart | 11 |
| France Albums Chart | 41 |
| Germany Albums Chart | 15 |
| Spain Albums Chart | 26 |
| Swiss Albums Chart | 45 |
| UK Independent Albums | 18 |
| US Billboard 200 | 83 |

== Certifications ==
| Region | Certification | Certified units/sales |
|---|---|---|
| Canada (Music Canada) | Platinum | 100,000^{^} |
^{^} Shipments figures based on certification alone.
