= Podevin =

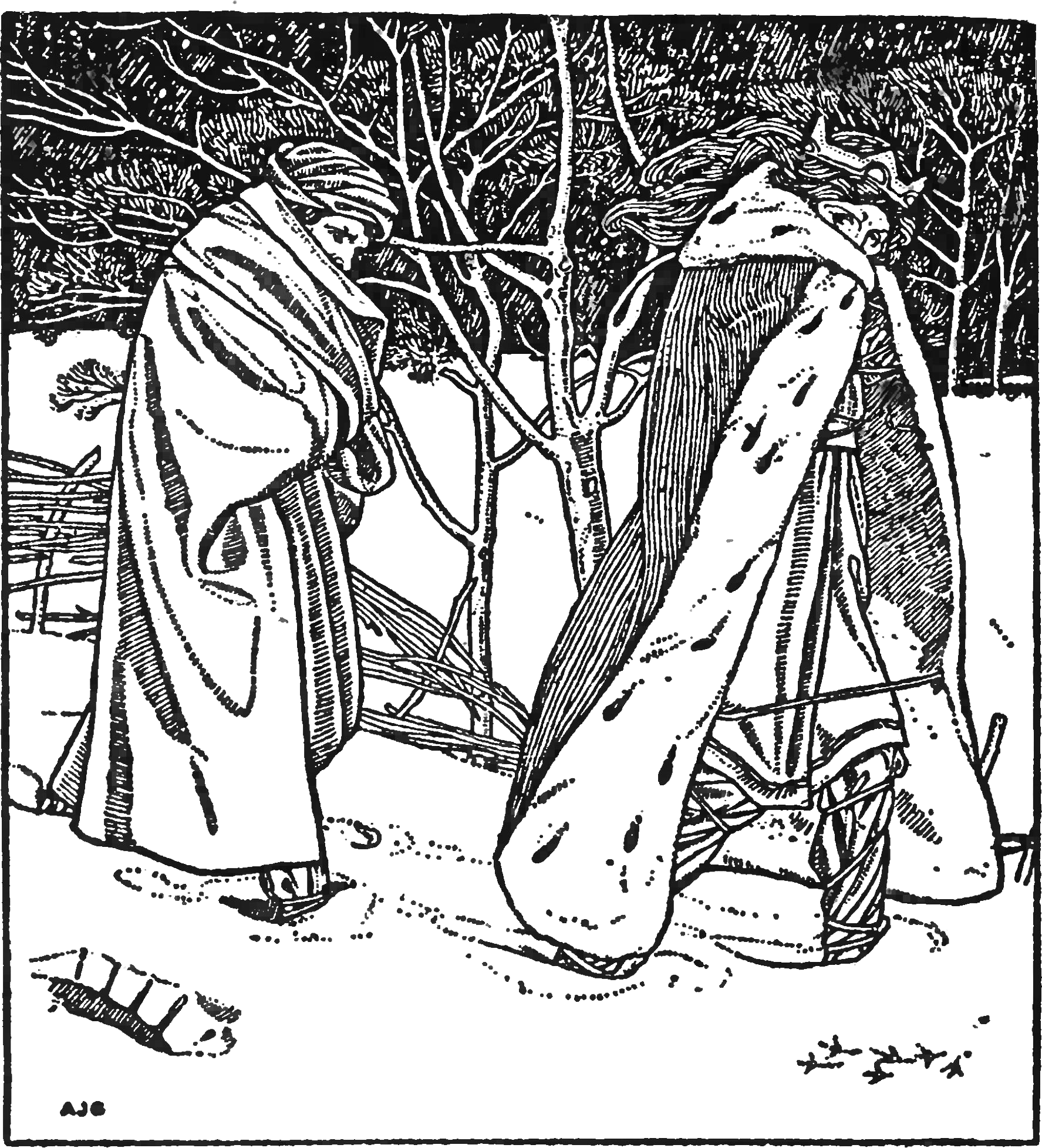
"Where the snow lay dinted"

Podevin was, according to legend, a page of Duke Wenceslaus I of Bohemia in the 10th century. He is immortalized because of his appearance in the Christmas carol "Good King Wenceslaus":

"Hither, page, and stand by me" (Line 9)
"Page and monarch, forth they went" (Line 21)
"Mark my footsteps, good my page" (Line 29)

== Life ==
As a servant Podevin was both loyal and faithful. It is said that he taught the members of the household how to sing the psalms. He is recorded as having helped Wenceslaus with his charitable works. Together they comforted the sick, poor, and orphaned members of Wenceslaus's realm. Like his master, he was a devoted Christian who cared for those who were less fortunate.

He escaped the murderers of Wenceslas, but later met his end after avenging the murder of Duke Wenceslaus.

It is said that after killing the chief conspirator of the assassination, he fled to the forest seeking forgiveness but was surrounded by Prince Boleslaus I's retainers and dragged to the gallows. The chroniclers tell us that his body was left hanging for several years. When he was finally buried, his spot became a stopping place for Christian pilgrims. He was respected for his piety and devotion to St. Wenceslaus. Today a chapel marks his ancient grave in the Czech Republic.

Besides his brief lines in the carol, the only words of Podevin to have come down to us are these few spoken before he slew the murderer of St. Wenceslaus:

"God will care for my health and salvation, but you have lost all your health and salvation long ago and you will die in sin forever."
