= The Book of Secrets (album) =

Studio album by Loreena McKennitt
- Released: September 30, 1997
- Genres: Folk; world; new-age
- Length: 53:00
- Labels: Quinlan Road, Warner Bros.
- Producer: Loreena McKennitt

Loreena McKennitt chronology
A Winter Garden: Five Songs for the Season (1995)	The Book of Secrets (1997)	Live in Paris and Toronto (1999)

Professional ratings
Review scores
Source	Rating
Allmusic	3/5 stars
sputnikmusic	4.5/5 stars

The Book of Secrets is the sixth studio album by Loreena McKennitt, released on September 30, 1997. It reached #17 on the Billboard 200. The lead single of the album, "The Mummers' Dance," remixed by DNA, was released during the winter of 1997–98, and peaked at #18 on the Billboard Hot 100, and #17 on the Modern Rock Tracks chart. The album is certified double-platinum in the United States. It has now sold more than four million copies worldwide.

== Track listing ==
All music written by Loreena McKennitt. All lyrics written by Loreena McKennitt except as noted.

1. "Prologue" – 4:22
2. "The Mummers' Dance" – 6:07
3. "Skellig" – 6:07
4. "Marco Polo" – 5:15
5. "The Highwayman" (lyric by Alfred Noyes, abridged by Loreena McKennitt) – 10:19
6. "La Serenissima" – 5:09
7. "Night Ride Across the Caucasus" – 8:30
8. "Dante's Prayer" – 7:11

== Song information ==
- The DNA remix of "The Mummers' Dance" was made into a music video.
- "Skellig" relates the dying words of a monk from a monastery that existed during the 6th–12th centuries on the island Skellig Michael (Great Skellig), 11.6 km west of Ireland.
- "The Highwayman" is an adaptation of the poem of the same name by Alfred Noyes.
- "Night Ride Across the Caucasus" appeared in the 1998 film Soldier.
- The music from "Night Ride Across the Caucasus" was used in the song "Kokli" by Ulytau.
- "Dante's Prayer" refers to Dante Alighieri's Divine Comedy.

== Personnel ==
This information is directly from the sleeve notes.

- Loreena McKennitt – vocals (tracks 1, 2, 3, 4, 5, 7, and 8), piano (track 8), keyboards, harp (track 6), kanun (track 1), accordion (tracks 4, 5)
- Anne Bourne – cello (track 6)
- Aidan Brennan – acoustic guitar (track 3), mandola (tracks 4, 7)
- Martin Brown – acoustic guitar (track 5), mandolin (track 5), mandola (track 5)
- Stuart Bruce – assembled drone (track 1), vocal drone (4)
- Paul Clarvis – snare drum (track 5)
- Nigel Eaton – hurdy-gurdy (track 2, 4)
- Steáfán Hannigan – bodhrán (track 5)
- Nick Hayley – sarangi (track 7), rebec (track 7), lira da braccio (track 7)
- Brian Hughes – oud (tracks 2, 4, 7), electric guitar (tracks 1, 5), acoustic guitar (tracks 4, 5, 7), irish bouzouki (tracks 4, 5, 7), guitar synthesizer (track 4), classical guitar (track 6), vocal drone (track 4)
- Robin Jeffrey – Victorian guitar (track 6)
- Martin Jenkins – mandocello (tracks 3, 4, 5, 7)
- Manu Katché – drums (tracks 1, 2, 4, 7)
- Caroline Lavelle – cello (tracks 2, 5, 8)
- Rick Lazar – percussion (tracks 1, 2, 4, 5, 7)
- Joanna Levine – viola da gamba (tracks 3, 6)
- Hugh Marsh – violin (tracks 2, 3, 4, 5, 6, 7, 8)
- Osama – violin (track 4)
- Steve Pigott – additional keyboards (tracks 3,8)
- Donald Quan – tabla (tracks 2,4,7), timba (track 1), esraj (track 1), viola (tracks 2,4,5,6,8), additional keyboards (tracks 3,4), vocal drone (track 4)
- Hossam Ramzy – percussion (tracks 2,4,5,7)
- David Rhodes – electric guitar (track 2)
- Danny Thompson – acoustic bass (tracks 2,3,4,5,7,8)
- Bob White – tin whistle (track 3), shawm (track 4)
- String Quartet:
  - Jonathan Rees – 1st violin (tracks 3,7)
  - Iain King – 2nd violin (tracks 3,7)
  - Andy Brown – viola (tracks 3,7)
  - Chris van Kampen – cello (tracks 3,7)
- Caroline Dale – string arrangements for tracks 3,6,7
- Additional string arrangements – Brian Gascoigne and Doug Riley

=== Production ===
- As listed in CD booklet:
  - Produced by Loreena McKennitt; assisted by Brian Hughes & Donald Quan
  - Recorded & Mixed by Kevin Killen (recorded track 1; mixed tracks 1, 2, 5 & 7) & Stuart Bruce (recorded tracks 2–8; mixed tracks 3, 4, 6 & 8)
  - Recording & mix assisted by Jacquie Turner, Justin Griffith, Marco Migliara
  - Mastered by Bob Ludwig
  - All songs published by Quinlan Road Music, except in Europe, South America & Southeast Asia (Quinlan Road Music/BMG Music Publishing International)

== Chart performance ==
Chart (1997–98)	Peak position
Australian Albums (ARIA)	33
Belgian Albums (Ultratop Flanders)	34
Belgian Albums (Ultratop Wallonia)	25
Canadian Albums (Billboard)	3
Danish Albums (Tracklisten)	14
Dutch Albums (Album Top 100)	29
French Albums (SNEP)	16
German Albums (Offizielle Top 100)	7
Hungarian Albums (MAHASZ)	37
Italian Albums (FIMI)	17
New Zealand Albums (RMNZ)	9
Norwegian Albums (VG-lista)	30
Spanish Albums (PROMUSICAE)	16
Swiss Albums (Schweizer Hitparade)	30
US Billboard 200	17
US World Albums (Billboard)	1

=== Year-end charts ===
Chart (1997)	Position
Belgian Albums (Ultratop Wallonia)	91
French Albums (IFOP)	88
German Albums (Offizielle Top 100)	92
Italian Albums (FIMI)	74
Chart (1998)	Position
Canadian Albums (RPM)	40
US Billboard 200	67

== Certifications ==
Region	Certification	Certified units/sales
Argentina (CAPIF)	Gold	30,000^{^}
Australia (ARIA)	Gold	35,000^{^}
Canada (Music Canada)	3× Platinum	400,000
France (SNEP)	Gold	110,000
Germany (BVMI)	Gold	250,000^{^}
Greece (IFPI Greece)	Gold	30,000^{^}
Italy	—	100,000
Spain (Promusicae)	Gold	70,000
United States (RIAA)	2× Platinum	1,867,000
Summaries
Worldwide	—	4,000,000
^{^} Shipments figures based on certification alone.

== Release history ==
Release dates and formats for The Book of Secrets
Region	Date	Format(s)	Label(s)	Ref.
United Kingdom	September 27, 2004	CD+DVD	Cadiz Music	
