= The Visit (Loreena McKennitt album) =

Studio album by Loreena McKennitt
- Released: September 27, 1991
- Genres: Folk; world; new-age
- Length: 49:10
- Labels: Quinlan Road, Warner Bros.
- Producer: Loreena McKennitt

Loreena McKennitt chronology
Parallel Dreams (1989)	The Visit (1991)	The Mask and Mirror (1994)

Professional ratings
Review scores
Source	Rating
AllMusic	4.5/5 stars
Calgary Herald	A

The Visit is the fourth studio album by Loreena McKennitt, released on September 27, 1991, the album has been certified four times Platinum in Canada and Gold in the United States. It was produced by McKennitt and Brian Hughes.

The album was a cowinner, with the compilation album Saturday Night Blues, of the 1992 Juno Award for Best Roots and Traditional Album of the Year.

The album was released as a limited edition, numbered, 180-gram vinyl in 2016.

A 30th anniversary edition of the album titled "The Visit - The Definitive Edition" was released on September 24, 2021.

== Track listing ==
No.	Title	Lyrics	Music	Length
1.	"All Souls Night"			5:09
2.	"Bonny Portmore"	traditional	traditional, arr. McKennitt	4:21
3.	"Between the Shadows"			3:42
4.	"The Lady of Shalott"	Alfred, Lord Tennyson (adapted by McKennitt)		11:34
5.	"Greensleeves"	traditional	traditional, arr. McKennitt	4:26
6.	"Tango to Evora"			4:10
7.	"Courtyard Lullaby"			4:57
8.	"The Old Ways"			5:44
9.	"Cymbeline"	William Shakespeare		5:07
Total length:				49:10

== Song information ==
- "All Souls Night" derives from McKennitt's merging of the traditions, mythology, and culture of Japan with old Celtic Samhain rituals. The "bonfires" and "figures dancing" are European, the "candles and lanterns" are from Japanese traditions.
- "Bonny Portmore" is a traditional Celtic folk song about oak forest deforestation. It was featured in the soundtrack of Highlander III: The Sorcerer (as well as "Cé Hé Mise le Ulaingt?" and "The Two Trees" from the album "The Mask and Mirror").
- "The Lady of Shalott" is based on the poem The Lady of Shalott by Alfred, Lord Tennyson. However, some poem lines in the original poem were removed in McKennitt's version, such as in Part III of the poem, the part "The gemmy bridle glitter'd free...Moves over still Shalott."
- Contrary to the album notes, "Greensleeves" was not actually written by Henry VIII; though this is a long-held belief and legend.
- "Tango to Evora" was used in the National Film Board of Canada documentary The Burning Times. A cover to the song has been recorded by one of Greece's most popular and respected singers, Haris Alexiou, titled "Nefeli's Tango", with lyrics written by herself. Another cover to the song has been recorded by Turkish singer, Nilüfer, titled "Çok Uzaklarda". Evora is a historical city in Portugal. There is also a Finnish cover, titled "Katkennut Helminauha" by Finnish singer, Anneli Saaristo and a German cover by Bettina Wegner under the title "Alles was ich wünsche". The Kurdish cover was by Homar Dizayî, under the title "Xozga". There is an Albanian cover, too, titled "Rrugës i trishtuar" (known also with the title "Sonata"), by the Albanian popular singer Eli Fara. A Romanian cover of the song, named “Tango pentru Evora” (Romanian translation of ”Tango to Evora”) was sung during the show “Dansez pentru tine” by Mălina Olinescu. The lyrics were written by Florin Busuioc.
- "Cymbeline" is taken from a song in the William Shakespeare play Cymbeline.
- Lyrics from "The Old Ways" are featured in the letter that Rachel Green writes to Ross Geller in the Friends fourth-season premier episode The One with the Jellyfish. While the contents of the letter are not displayed on screen, the letter is on exhibit in the touring The Friends Experience exhibition.

== Personnel ==
- Loreena McKennitt – synthesizer, piano, harp, accordion, bodhran, vocals, arranger, producer, adaptation
- Anne Bourne – cello
- Al Cross – drums
- Tom Hazlett – bass
- Brian Hughes – balalaika, electric & acoustic guitar, assistant engineer, assistant producer
- Patrick Hutchinson – uilleann pipes
- George Koller – bass, cello, mad fiddle, tamboura, sitar
- Rick Lazar – percussion, udu drum
- Hugh Marsh – fiddle

=== Other personnel ===
- Jeff Wolpert – engineer, mixing, assistant producer

== Certifications ==
Region	Certification	Certified units/sales
Australia (ARIA)	Gold	35,000^{^}
Brazil (Pro-Música Brasil)	Gold	100,000^{*}
Canada (Music Canada)	4× Platinum	400,000^{^}
Spain (Promusicae)	Gold	50,000^{^}
United States (RIAA)	Gold	646,000
Summaries
Worldwide	—N/a	1,400,000
^{*} Sales figures based on certification alone.^{^} Shipments figures based on certification alone.

== Release history ==
Release dates and formats for The Visit
Region	Date	Format(s)	Label(s)	Ref.
United Kingdom	September 27, 2004	CD+DVD	Cadiz Music	
