= Parallel Dreams =

Studio album by Loreena McKennitt
- Released: March 7, 1989
- Genre: Folk
- Length: 43:12
- Label: Quinlan Road
- Producer: Loreena McKennitt

Loreena McKennitt chronology
To Drive the Cold Winter Away (1987)	Parallel Dreams (1989)	The Visit (1991)

Professional ratings
Review scores
Source	Rating
Allmusic	4/5 stars

Parallel Dreams is Canadian musician Loreena McKennitt's third studio album, released on March 7, 1989. The album features McKennitt's own original compositions along with her interpretations of traditional material. It is one of the most successful independently-released Canadian albums ever.

== Track listing ==
All songs written by Loreena McKennitt except as noted.

1. "Samain Night" – 4:27
2. "Moon Cradle" (Padraic Colum, McKennitt) – 4:29
3. "Huron 'Beltane' Fire Dance" – 4:20
4. "Annachie Gordon" (traditional, arr. McKennitt) – 8:22
5. "Standing Stones" (lyrics: traditional, music by McKennitt) – 6:56
6. "Dickens' Dublin (The Palace)" – 4:40
7. "Breaking the Silence" – 6:23
8. "Ancient Pines" – 3:35

== Song information ==
- "Huron 'Beltane' Fire Dance" takes its inspiration, in part, from Huron festivities and the Gaelic Beltane celebrations.
- "Breaking the Silence" was written as a tribute to Amnesty International.
- "Ancient Pines" was composed for use in the documentary film Goddess Remembered.

== Certifications ==
Region	Certification	Certified units/sales
Canada	—	93,000

== Release history ==
Release dates and formats for Parallel Dreams
Region	Date	Format(s)	Label(s)	Ref.
United Kingdom	September 27, 2004	CD+DVD	Cadiz Music	
