= A Very Swingin' Basie Christmas! =

Studio album by Count Basie Orchestra
- Released: November 6, 2015
- Recorded: August 2014 – July 2015
- Label: Concord

A Very Swingin' Basie Christmas! is a 2015 Christmas album by the Count Basie Orchestra, directed by Scotty Barnhart, and released by Concord Records. The album was recorded between August 2014 and July 2015.

== Track listing ==
1. "Jingle Bells" (Pierpont) [2:37]
2. "Let It Snow" – with Ellis Marsalis (Styne/Cahn) [5:56]
3. "It's the Holiday Season" – with Johnny Mathis (Thompson) [4:02]
4. "Silent Night" (Gruber/Mohr/traditional) [3:25]
5. "Good "Swing" Wenceslas" (Helmore/Neale/traditional) [3:35]
6. "The Christmas Song" – with Ledisi (Torme/Wells) [3:42]
7. "Little Drummer Boy" (Davis/Onorati/Simeone) [4:51]
8. "Sleigh Ride" (Anderson/Parish) [3:50]
9. "Have Yourself a Merry Little Christmas" – with Carmen Bradford (Blane/Martin) [5:04]
10. "Winter Wonderland" (Bernard/Smith) [3:10]
11. "I'll Be Home for Christmas" – with Ellis Marsalis & Plas Johnson (Gannon/Kent/Ram) [4:31]
