= To Drive the Cold Winter Away =

Studio album by Loreena McKennitt
- Released: January 11, 1987
- Genre: Folk · seasonal recording
- Length: 44:29
- Label: Quinlan Road
- Producer: Loreena McKennitt

Loreena McKennitt chronology
Elemental (1985)	To Drive the Cold Winter Away (1987)	Parallel Dreams (1989)

Professional ratings
Review scores
Source	Rating
Allmusic	3.5/5 stars

To Drive the Cold Winter Away is Canadian musician Loreena McKennitt's second studio album, released on January 11, 1987. It pays homage to her childhood memories of music for the winter season, the most vivid of which "came from songs and carols recorded in churches or great halls, rich with their own unique ambience and tradition."

To capture that remembered ambiance, McKennitt kept the arrangements sparse, celebrating the beauty of simplicity. She also chose to leave the found sounds of life in the performances, which were recorded on location in churches and great halls:

- The Church of Our Lady in Guelph, Ontario, Canada
- Glenstal Abbey, A Benedictine Monastery near Limerick, Ireland
- Annaghmakerrig (The Tyrone Guthrie Centre) in County Monaghan, Ireland

== Track listing ==
No.	Title	Length
1.	"In Praise of Christmas" (traditional)	6:06
2.	"The Seasons" (traditional)	4:55
3.	"The King" (traditional)	2:04
4.	"Banquet Hall" (McKennitt)	3:53
5.	"Snow" (Archibald Lampman, McKennitt)	5:35
6.	"Balulalow" (traditional)	3:09
7.	"Let Us the Infant Greet" (traditional)	3:46
8.	"The Wexford Carol" (traditional)	6:07
9.	"The Stockford Carol" (McKennitt)	3:02
10.	"Let All That Are to Mirth Inclined" (traditional)	6:52
Total length:		44:29

== Song information ==
- "The King" features vocals by Cedric Smith. Shannon Purves-Smith plays Viols on two other tracks. Everything else was done by McKennitt.
- "Snow" uses the words of the poem of the same name by Archibald Lampman. It was included on a Windham Hill Records album titled Celtic Christmas (1995).

== Certifications ==
Region	Certification	Certified units/sales
Worldwide	—	84,000

== Release history ==
Release dates and formats for To Drive the Cold Winter Away
Region	Date	Format(s)	Label(s)	Ref.
United Kingdom	September 27, 2004	CD+DVD	Cadiz Music	
