= A Winter Garden: Five Songs for the Season =

EP by Loreena McKennitt
- Released: November 1995
- Recorded: Real World Studios (Bath, England)
- Genre: Folk
- Length: 22:28
- Label: Quinlan Road, Warner Bros.
- Producer: Loreena McKennitt

Loreena McKennitt chronology
Live in San Francisco at the Palace of Fine Arts (1995)	A Winter Garden: Five Songs for the Season (1995)	The Book of Secrets (1997)

Professional ratings
Review scores
Source	Rating
Allmusic	2/5 stars
Emusic	4.5/5 stars

A Winter Garden: Five Songs for the Season is an extended play (EP) by Loreena McKennitt. Recorded and released in 1995, it contains five tracks: three Christmas carols, McKennitt's adaptation of Archibald Lampman's poem "Snow" (also released on To Drive the Cold Winter Away), and the traditional English "Seeds of Love."

All the tracks on the EP were later released on her eighth studio album, A Midwinter Night's Dream (2008).

== Track listing ==
1. "Coventry Carol" – 2:21
2. "God Rest Ye Merry, Gentlemen" – 6:49
3. "Good King Wenceslas" – 3:19
4. "Snow" – 5:04
5. "Seeds of Love" – 4:57

== Charts ==
Chart (1995)	Peak position
Australia (ARIA)	93

== Certifications and sales ==
Region	Certification	Certified units/sales
Canada (Music Canada)	Gold	55,000
United States	—	60,000
Summaries
Worldwide	—	350,000
