= Elemental (Loreena McKennitt album) =

Studio album by Loreena McKennitt
- Released: 1985
- Recorded: July 1985
- Studio: Elora Sound
- Genre: Folk
- Length: 36:27
- Label: Quinlan Road
- Producer: Loreena McKennitt

Loreena McKennitt chronology
Elemental (1985)	To Drive the Cold Winter Away (1987)

Professional ratings
Review scores
Source	Rating
Allmusic	4/5 stars

Elemental is the debut studio album by Canadian musician, composer, singer-songwriter and instrumentalist Loreena McKennitt and the vehicle with which she launched the Quinlan Road label. The album was recorded in one week in July 1985 and released later in the year. The studio was a barn in southern Ontario, situated in a field of sunflowers. It has sold over 67,000 copies worldwide to date.

== Track listing ==
1. "Blacksmith" (traditional, McKennitt) – 3:20
2. "She Moved Through the Fair" (traditional, Padraic Colum, McKennitt) – 4:05
3. "Stolen Child" (McKennitt, W. B. Yeats) – 5:05
4. "The Lark in the Clear Air" (traditional, McKennitt) – 2:06
5. "Carrighfergus" (traditional) 3:24
6. "Kellswater" (traditional, McKennitt) – 5:19
7. "Banks of Claudy" (traditional, McKennitt) – 5:37
8. "Come by the Hills" (traditional, McKennitt) – 3:05
9. "Lullaby" (William Blake, McKennitt) – 4:26

== Song information ==
- "Stolen Child" is based on the William Butler Yeats poem "The Stolen Child".
- The main vocals of "Carrighfergus" are sung by Cedric Smith.
- "Lullaby" uses the words of a poem by William Blake Prologue intended for a dramatic piece of King Edward the Fourth. The song was written for the 1983 Stratford Festival of Canada production of Blake by Elliott Hayes and performed by Douglas Campbell.

== Release history ==
Release dates and formats for Elemental
Region	Date	Format(s)	Label(s)	Ref.
United Kingdom	September 27, 2004	CD+DVD	Cadiz Music	
