= Good King Wenceslas =

Victorian Christmas carol

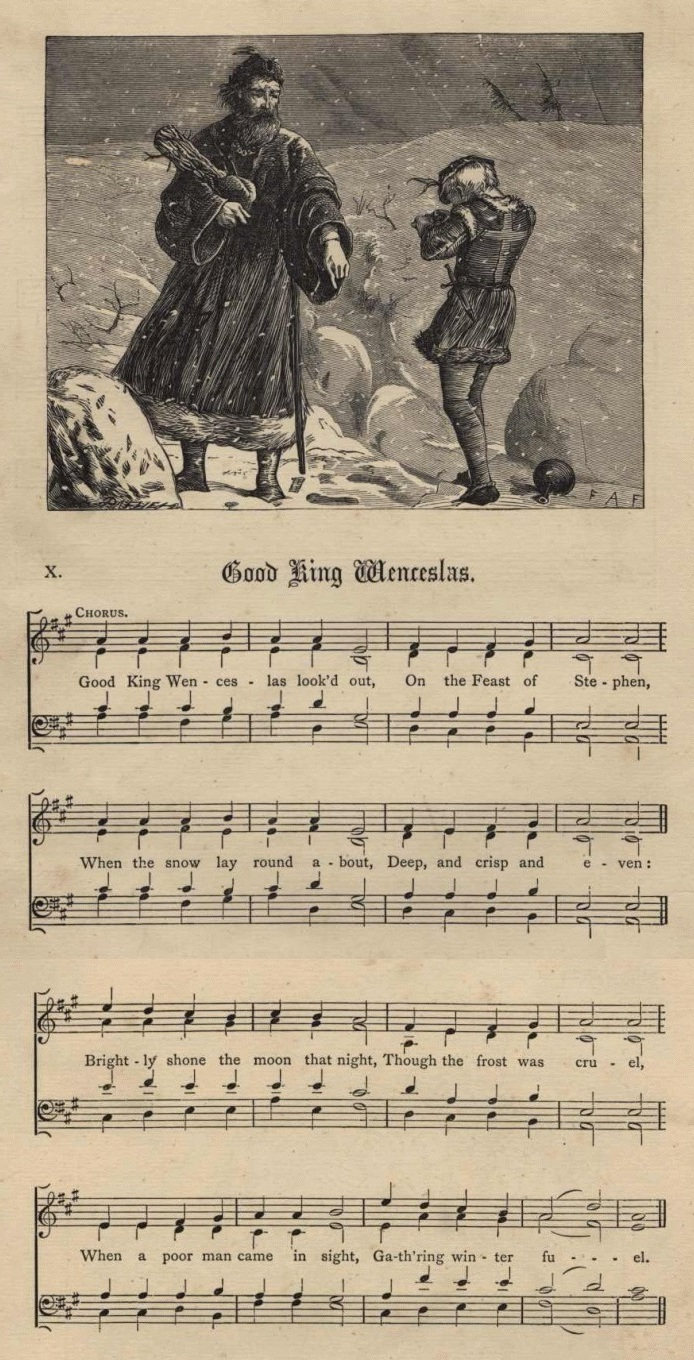
Good King Wenceslas, illustrated in Christmas Carols, New and Old

"Good King Wenceslaus"
The first, third, and fifth verses, performed by the chorus of the U. S. Army Band

"Good King Wencesla(u)s" (Roud number 24754) is a Christmas carol that tells a story of a tenth-century king of Bohemia (a former kingdom now within the modern day Czech Republic) who goes on a journey, braving harsh winter weather, to give alms to a poor peasant on the Feast of Stephen. During the journey, his page is about to give up the struggle against the cold weather, but is enabled to continue by following the king's footprints, step for step, through the deep snow.

The legend is based on a story about Saint Wenceslaus I, Duke of Bohemia (907–935).

In 1853, English hymnwriter John Mason Neale wrote the lyrics in collaboration with his music editor Thomas Helmore to fit the melody of the 13th-century spring carol "Tempus adest floridum" ("The Blooming Time Is Here"), which they had found in the 1582 Finnish song collection Piae Cantiones. The carol first appeared in Carols for Christmas-Tide, published by Novello & Co the same year.

== Source legend ==
Wenceslas was considered a martyr and a saint immediately after his death in the tenth century, when a cult of Wenceslas rose up in Bohemia. Within a few decades of Wenceslas's death, four biographies of him were in circulation. These hagiographies had a powerful influence on the High Middle Ages conceptualization of the rex iustus, or "righteous king"—that is, a monarch whose power stems mainly from his great piety, as well as from his princely vigor.

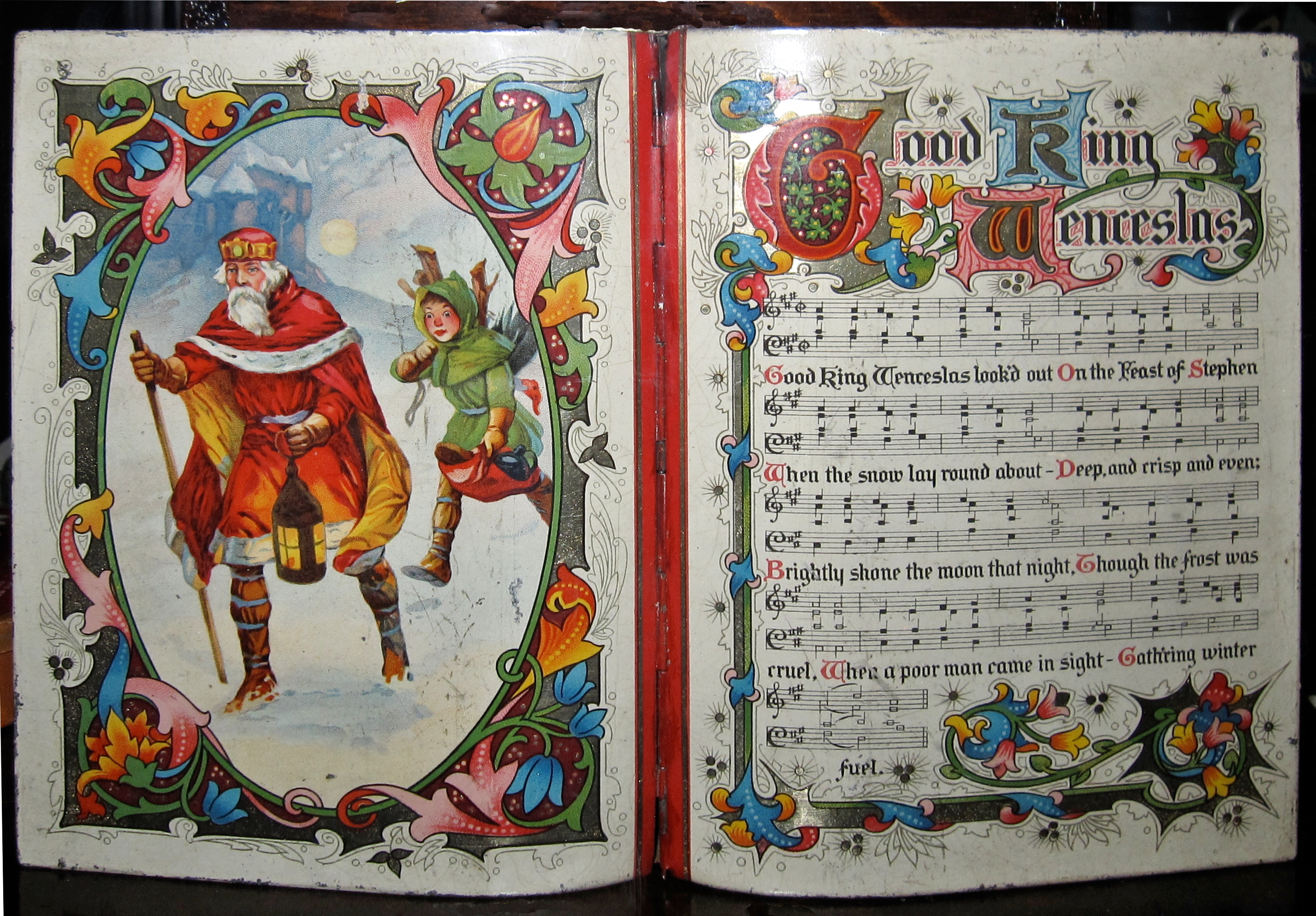
Sheet music of "Good King Wenceslas" in a biscuit container from 1913, preserved at the Victoria and Albert Museum.

Referring approvingly to these hagiographies, a preacher from the 12th century wrote:

But his deeds I think you know better than I could tell you; for, as is read in his Passion, no one doubts that, rising every night from his noble bed, with bare feet and only one chamberlain, he went around to God's churches and gave alms generously to widows, orphans, those in prison and afflicted by every difficulty, so much so that he was considered, not a prince, but the father of all the wretched.

Several centuries later the legend was claimed as fact by Pope Pius II, who himself also walked ten miles barefoot in the ice and snow as an act of pious thanksgiving.

Although Wenceslas was, during his lifetime, only a duke, Holy Roman Emperor Otto I (962–973) posthumously "conferred on [Wenceslas] the regal dignity and title" and that is why, in the legend and song, he is referred to as a "king". The usual English spelling of Duke Wenceslas's name, Wenceslaus, is occasionally encountered in later textual variants of the carol, although it was not used by Neale in his version. Wenceslas is not to be confused with King Wenceslaus I of Bohemia (Wenceslaus I Premyslid), who lived more than three centuries later.

A statue of Saint Wenceslas on horseback can be found at the Wenceslas Square, in Prague.

== History ==
=== Authorship ===
==== Tempus adest floridum ====
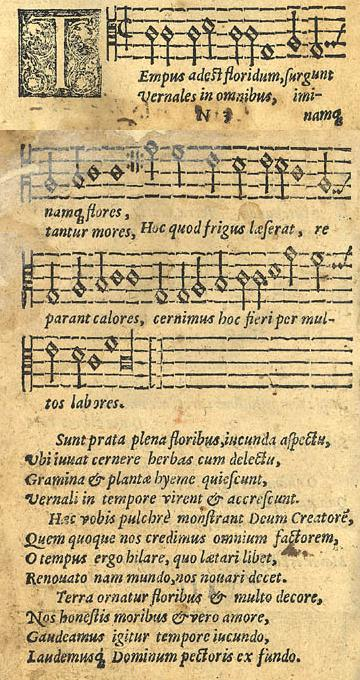
"Tempus adest floridum" in the 1582 Finnish song collection Piae Cantiones. The melody formed the basis for the carol.

The tune is that of "Tempus adest floridum" ("The Blooming Time is Here"), a 13th-century spring carol in 76 76 Doubled Trochaic metre, first published in the Finnish song book Piae Cantiones in 1582. Piae Cantiones is a collection of seventy-four songs compiled by Jacobus Finno, the Protestant headmaster of Turku Cathedral School, and published by Theodoric Petri, a young Catholic printer. The book is a unique document of European songs intended not only for use in church, but also schools, thus making the collection a unique record of the late medieval period.

A text beginning substantially the same as the 1582 "Piae" version is also found in the German manuscript collection Carmina Burana as CB 142, where it is substantially more carnal; CB 142 has clerics and virgins playing the "game of Venus" (goddess of love) in the meadows, while in the Piae version they are praising the Lord from the bottom of their hearts. The tune has also been used for the Christmas hymn Mary Gently Laid Her Child, by Joseph S. Cook (1859–1933); GIA Publications's hymnal Worship uses "Tempus Adest Floridum" only for Cook's hymn.

=== Neale's carol ===
In 1853, English hymnwriter John Mason Neale wrote the "Wenceslas" lyric, in collaboration with his music editor Thomas Helmore, and the carol first appeared in Carols for Christmas-Tide, published by Novello & Co the same year.

The text of Neale's carol bears no relation to the words of "Tempus Adest Floridum". In or around 1853, G. J. R. Gordon, the British envoy and minister in Stockholm, gave a rare copy of the 1582 edition of Piae Cantiones to Neale, who was Warden of Sackville College, East Grinstead, Sussex and to the Reverend Thomas Helmore (Vice-Principal of St. Mark's College, Chelsea).

The book was entirely unknown in England at that time. As a member of the Tractarian Oxford Movement, Neale was interested in restoring Catholic ceremony, saints days, and music back into the Anglican church. The gift from G. J. R. Gordon gave him the opportunity to use medieval Catholic melodies for Anglican hymn writing.

The background material for Neale's carol originated in a poem by the Czech author Václav Alois Svoboda (1791–1849), which was published in Prague in 1847 under the title “Sanct Wenceslaw und Podiwin. Legende in böhmischer, teutscher und lateinischer Sprache” (“Saint Wenceslas and Podiwin. Legend in Bohemian, German, and Latin languages”).

In 1849 he had published Deeds of Faith: Stories for Children from Church History which recounted legends from Christian tradition in Romantic prose. One of the chapters told the legend of St Wenceslas and his footsteps melting the snow for his page:

"My liege," he said, "I cannot go on. The wind freezes my very blood. Pray you, let us return."

"Seems it so much?" asked the King. "Was not His journey from Heaven a wearier and a colder way than this?"

Otto answered not.

"Follow me on still," said S. Wenceslaus. "Only tread in my footsteps, and you will proceed more easily."

The servant knew that his master spoke not at random. He carefully looked for the footsteps of the King: he set his own feet in the print of his lord's feet.

For his 1853 publication Carols for Christmas-tide, he adapted his earlier prose story into a poem, and together with the music editor Thomas Helmore added the words to the melody in Piae Cantiones, adding a reference to Saint Stephen's Day (26 December), making it suitable for performance on that Saint's Day.

The hymn's lyrics take the form of five eight-line stanzas in four-stress lines. Each stanza has an ABABCDCD rhyme scheme. Lines 1, 3, 5, and 7 end in single-syllable (so-called masculine) rhymes, and lines 2, 4, 6, and 8 with two-syllable ("feminine") rhymes. (In the English tradition, two-syllable rhymes are generally associated with light or comic verse, which may be part of the reason some critics have demeaned Neale's lyrics as "doggerel".)

In the music the two-syllable rhymes in lines 2, 4, and 6 (e.g. "Stephen/even", "cruel/fuel") are set to two half-notes (British "minims"), but the final rhyme of each stanza (line 8) is spread over two full measures, the first syllable as two half-notes and the second as a whole note ("semi-breve")—so "fuel" is set as "fu-" with two half-notes and "-el" with a whole-note. Thus, unusually, the final musical line differs from all the others in having not two but three measures of 4/4 time.

Some academics are critical of Neale's textual substitution. H. J. L. J. Massé wrote in 1921:

Why, for instance, do we tolerate such impositions as "Good King Wenceslas?" The original was and is an Easter Hymn...it is marked in carol books as "traditional", a delightful word which often conceals ignorance. There is nothing traditional in it as a carol.

A similar sentiment is expressed by the editors (Percy Dearmer, Martin Shaw and Ralph Vaughan Williams) in the 1928 Oxford Book of Carols, which is even more critical of Neale's carol:

This rather confused narrative owes its popularity to the delightful tune, which is that of a Spring carol. . . . Unfortunately Neale in 1853 substituted for the Spring carol this 'Good King Wenceslas', one of his less happy pieces, which E. Duncan goes so far as to call 'doggerel', and Bullen condemns as 'poor and commonplace to the last degree'. The time has not yet come for a comprehensive book to discard it; but we reprint the tune in its proper setting . . . not without hope that, with the present wealth of carols for Christmas, 'Good King Wenceslas' may gradually pass into disuse, and the tune be restored to spring-time.

Elizabeth Poston, in the Penguin Book of Christmas Carols, refers to the song as the "product of an unnatural marriage between Victorian whimsy and the thirteenth-century dance carol". She goes on to say that Neale's "ponderous moral doggerel" does not fit the lighthearted dance measure of the original tune, and that if performed in the correct manner it "sounds ridiculous to pseudo-religious words". A similar development has occurred with the song "O Christmas Tree," the tune of which has been used for "Maryland, My Maryland," "The Red Flag," and other unrelated songs.

By contrast, Brian Scott, quoting from The Oxford Book of Carols its criticism and hope that the carol would "pass into disuse", argues: "Thankfully, they were wrong", for the carol "still reminds us that the giving spirit of Christmas should not happen just on that day. . . ." Jeremy Summerly and Nicolas Bell of the British Museum also strongly rebut Dearmer's 20th century criticism, noting: "it could have been awful, but it isn't, it's magical . . . you remember it because the verse just works".

== Textual comparison ==
| Neale's "Good King Wenceslas" (1853) | "Tempus adest floridum" (Piae Cantiones, PC 74) | English translation of PC 74 by Percy Dearmer (1867–1936) | "Tempus adest floridum" (Carmina Burana, CB 142) | English translation of CB 142 by John Addington Symonds (1884) |
|---|---|---|---|---|
| Good King Wenceslas looked out, on the Feast of Stephen, When the snow lay round about, deep and crisp and even; Brightly shone the moon that night, tho' the frost was cruel, When a poor man came in sight, gath'ring winter fuel. | Tempus adest floridum, surgunt namque flores Vernales in omnibus, imitantur mores Hoc quod frigus laeserat, reparant calores Cernimus hoc fieri, per multos labores. | Spring has now unwrapped the flowers, day is fast reviving, Life in all her growing powers towards the light is striving: Gone the iron touch of cold, winter time and frost time, Seedlings, working through the mould, now make up for lost time. | Tempus adest floridum, surgunt namque flores vernales mox; in omnibus immutantur mores. Hoc, quod frigus laeserat, reparant calores; Cernimus hoc fieri per multos colores. | Now comes the time of flowers, and the blossoms appear; now in all things comes the transformation of Spring. What the cold harmed, the warmth repairs, as we see by all these colours. |
| "Hither, page, and stand by me, if thou know'st it, telling, Yonder peasant, who is he? Where and what his dwelling?" "Sire, he lives a good league hence, underneath the mountain; Right against the forest fence, by Saint Agnes' fountain." | Sunt prata plena floribus, iucunda aspectu Ubi iuvat cernere, herbas cum delectu Gramina et plantae hyeme quiescunt Vernali in tempore virent et accrescunt. | Herb and plant that, winter long, slumbered at their leisure, Now bestirring, green and strong, find in growth their pleasure; All the world with beauty fills, gold the green enhancing, Flowers make glee among the hills, and set the meadows dancing. | Stant prata plena floribus, in quibus nos ludamus! Virgines cum clericis simul procedamus, Per amorem Veneris ludum faciamus, ceteris virginibus ut hoc referamus! | The fields in which we play are full of flowers. Maidens and clerics, let us go out together, let us play for the love of Venus, that we may teach the other maidens. |
| "Bring me flesh, and bring me wine, bring me pine logs hither: Thou and I shall see him dine, when we bear them thither." Page and monarch, forth they went, forth they went together; Through the rude wind's wild lament and the bitter weather. | Haec vobis pulchre monstrant Deum creatorem Quem quoque nos credimus omnium factorem O tempus ergo hilare, quo laetari libet Renovato nam mundo, nos novari decet. | Through each wonder of fair days God himself expresses; Beauty follows all his ways, as the world he blesses: So, as he renews the earth, Artist without rival, In his grace of glad new birth we must seek revival. | "O dilecta domina, cur sic alienaris? An nescis, o carissima, quod sic adamaris? Si tu esses Helena, vellem esse Paris! Tamen potest fieri noster amor talis." | "O my chosen one, why dost thou shun me? Dost thou not know, dearest, how much thou art loved? If thou wert Helen, I would be Paris. So great is our love that it can be so." |
| "Sire, the night is darker now, and the wind blows stronger; Fails my heart, I know not how; I can go no longer." "Mark my footsteps, good my page; Tread thou in them boldly: Thou shalt find the winter's rage Freeze thy blood less coldly." | Terra ornatur floribus et multo decore Nos honestis moribus et vero amore Gaudeamus igitur tempore iucundo Laudemusque Dominum pectoris ex fundo. | Earth puts on her dress of glee; flowers and grasses hide her; We go forth in charity— brothers all beside her; For, as man this glory sees in the awakening season, Reason learns the heart's decrees, and hearts are led by reason. | | |
| In his master's steps he trod, where the snow lay dinted; Heat was in the very sod which the saint had printed. Therefore, Christian men, be sure, wealth or rank possessing, Ye who now will bless the poor, shall yourselves find blessing. | | Praise the Maker, all ye saints; he with glory girt you, He who skies and meadows paints fashioned all your virtue; Praise him, seers, heroes, kings, heralds of perfection; Brothers, praise him, for he brings all to resurrection! | | |

== Other versions ==
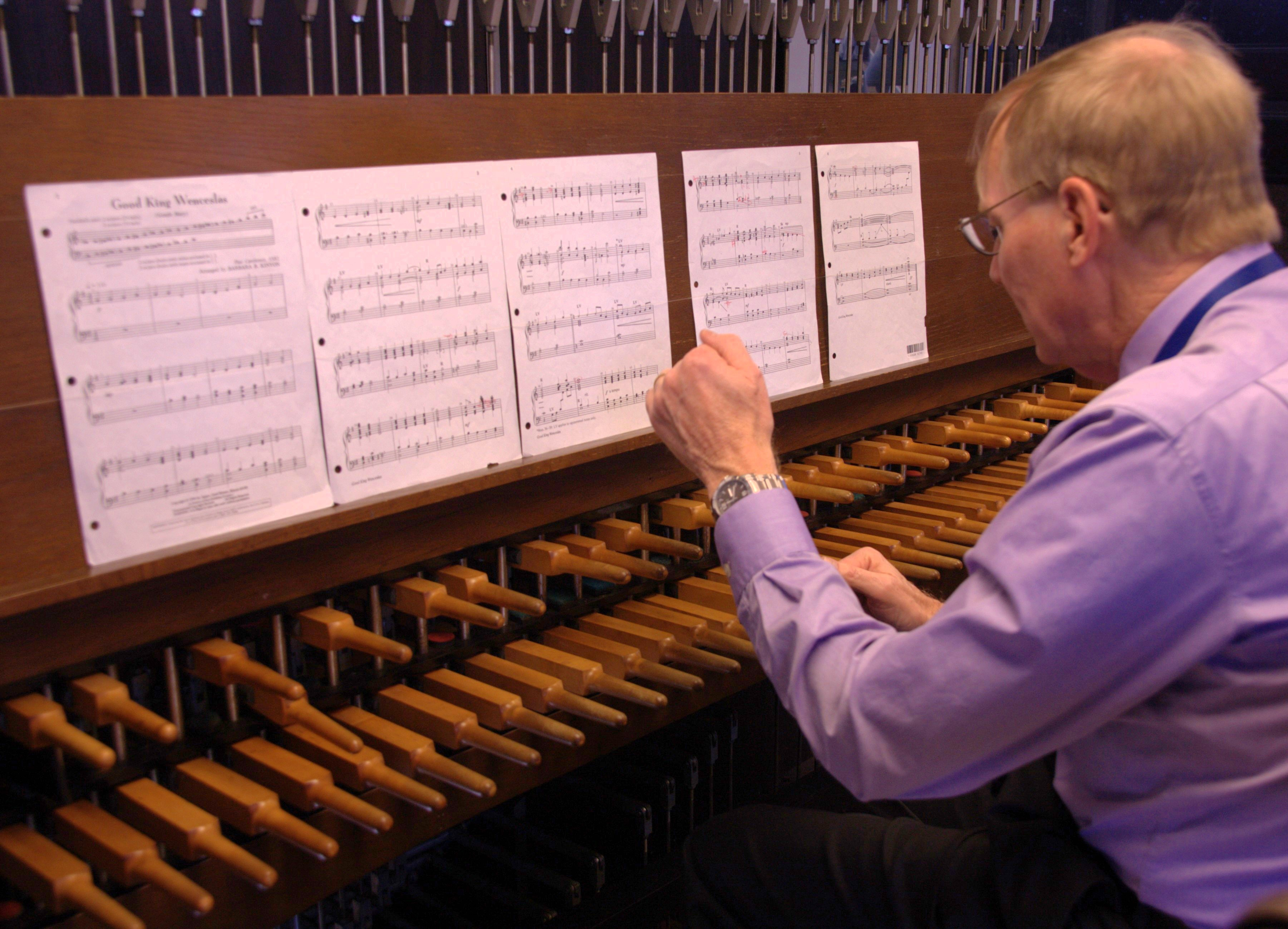
A carillonneur performing the song on the 56-bell carillon of the Plummer Building, Rochester, Minnesota, US, Christmas 2016

- William Lloyd Webber included "Good King Wenceslas" as one of his Songs without Words.
- Bing Crosby first covered the song on his 1949 album Christmas Greetings, and later with Ella Fitzgerald.
- The Beatles' Christmas Record featured several renditions of the carol.
- In 1984, Mannheim Steamroller recorded an electronic synthesizer arrangement of the carol for their first Christmas album.
- R.E.M. recorded a version of the song for their Christmas '89 holiday single.
- The song's tune was re-worked by the Trans-Siberian Orchestra on their track "Christmas Jazz", from their 2004 CD The Lost Christmas Eve.
- It was covered by English folk duo Blackmore's Night on their 2006 album Winter Carols.
- It was covered by Canadian Celtic singer Loreena McKennitt on her 1995 EP A Winter Garden: Five Songs for the Season, and reissued on her 2008 album A Midwinter Night's Dream.
- In 2013, The Piano Guys made a piano-cello instrumental cover of this song for A Family Christmas, their Christmas studio album.
- Mel Tormé covered the song on his 1992 Christmas Songs album.
- The Count Basie Orchestra recorded a Sammy Nestico Big Band Arrangement of the song, re-named to 'Good Swing Wenceslas', on their 2015 Album 'A Very Swingin' Basie Christmas'.
- Child Bite covered the song in their 2018 anthology Burnt Offerings.
- Tenth Avenue North opened their 2017 Christmas album, Decade The Halls, with the song, setting it to 1920s era music.
- Rob Halford, vocalist of metal band Judas Priest, covered the song on his 2019 Christmas album, Celestial.
- The song is included on We Three Kings, the sixth studio album by the folk trio The Roches, released in 1990 on MCA Records.
- The song is included in Relient K's Christmas Album Let It Snow, Baby... Let It Reindeer under the title, "Good King Wenceslas"
- Millennial Choirs and Orchestras included "Good King Wenceslas" in their 2020 album Star of Wonder.

== See also ==
- List of Christmas carols
- Saint Wenceslas Chorale

== Literature ==
- Scott, Brian (2015). But Do You Recall? 25 Days of Christmas Carols and the Stories Behind Them, Anderson, ISBN 978-1-329-91959-4
