= Nigel Eaton =

English musician (born 1966)

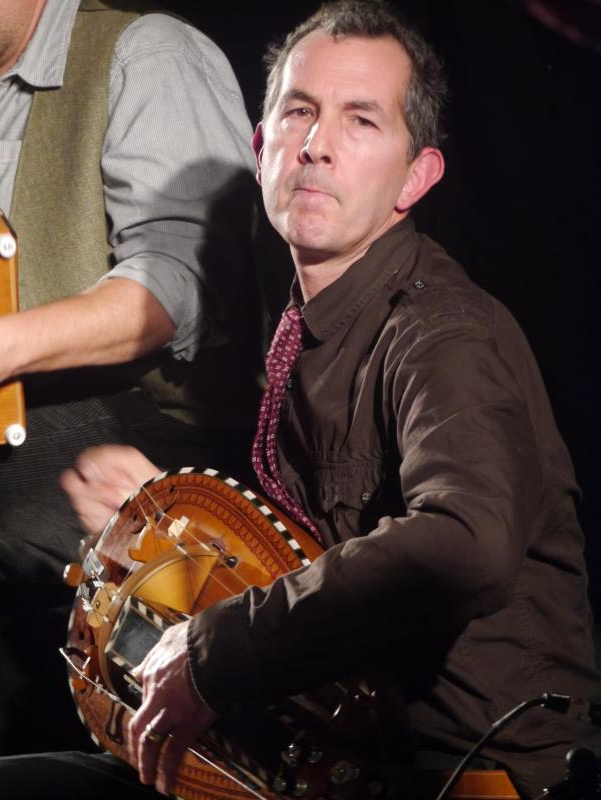
- Eaton in 2013

Background information
- Born: Lyndhurst, Hampshire, England
- Occupation: Furniture maker
- Instrument: Hurdy-gurdy
- Years active: 1987–present
- Formerly of: Page and Plant; Blowzabella
- Website: nigeleaton.co.uk

Nigel Eaton is a British multi-instrumentalist and composer best known for playing the hurdy-gurdy. Born in Lyndhurst, Eaton played the piano and cello before switching to the hurdy-gurdy in 1981 when his father, Christopher Eaton, began manufacturing them. Eaton has been described as the "foremost hurdy-gurdy player in popular music in North America and Europe".

== Career ==
Eaton has performed as a member of a number of different bands, including Whirling Pope Joan (with Julie Murphy), Blowzabella, Ancient Beatbox, The Duellists, and Firestarters of Leiden. He has released five solo albums, The Music of the Hurdy-Gurdy (1987), Pandemonium (2002), Fezziwig (2024), Lymington Fair (2025), and Fête Trompêttre (2025), as well as the collaborative album Panic at the Café (1993) with Andy Cutting.

As a session musician, Eaton has contributed to the film scores for Robin Hood, The Shipping News, Kingdom of Heaven, Aliens, Mansfield Park, Tulip Fever, Peaky Blinders: The Immortal Man, The House of Guinness, and Carl Davis's 1980 score for the 1927 silent film Napoléon. Eaton wrote "The Halsway Schottische", a tune which later became "The Halsway Carol" (with lyrics by friend and collaborator Iain Frisk) and has seen hundreds of versions performed. He has performed Howard Skempton's Concerto for Hurdy-gurdy and Percussion (written for himself and Evelyn Glennie) with the Scottish Chamber Orchestra and the Bournemouth Sinfonietta.

Eaton has collaborated and recorded with a wide range of other artists including Afro Celt Sound System, Loreena McKennitt, Jimmy Page and Robert Plant, Scott Walker, Shelleyan Orphan, New London Consort, Heidi Berry, Gary Kemp, Bombay Bicycle Club, Blue Aeroplanes, Martin Simpson, The Palladian Ensemble, Moya Brennan, Robert Plant, Maddy Prior, June Tabor, Silly Sisters, The Tavener Consort, Jake Walton, and Hamish Moore.

In addition to his work in music and film, Eaton is a designer and maker of built-in furniture in South London.

== Discography ==
Solo albums

- The Music of the Hurdy-Gurdy (1987)
- Pandemonium (2002)
- Fezziwig (2024)
- Lymington Fair (2025)
- Fête Trompêttre (2025)

Collaborative albums

- Panic at the Café (with Andy Cutting) (1993)

With Blowzabella

- Wall of Sound (1986)
- The B to A of Blowzabella (1986)
- Pingha Frenzy (1987)
- A Richer Dust (1988)
- Vanilla (1990)

With Ancient Beatbox

- Ancient Beatbox (1989)

With Whirling Pope Joan

- Spin (1994)

With The Duellists

- English Hurdy-Gurdy Music (1997)

== Recording credits ==
Year	Album	Artist	Credit(s)
1987	Mother Fist and Her Five Daughters	Marc Almond & the Willing Sinners	Hurdy-gurdy, percussion
1987	Spitting Out Miracles	The Blue Aeroplanes	Hurdy-gurdy
1987	No More to the Dance	Silly Sisters	Hurdy-gurdy
1991	Humroot	Shelleyan Orphan	Hurdy-gurdy
1993	Fate of Nations	Robert Plant	Hurdy-gurdy on "Come Into My Life" and "I Believe"
1994	The Mask and Mirror	Loreena McKennitt	Hurdy-gurdy
1994	No Quarter: Jimmy Page and Robert Plant Unledded	Jimmy Page & Robert Plant	Hurdy-gurdy
1997	Big City Secrets	Joseph Arthur	Hurdy-gurdy
1997	Les Saisons Amusantes	The Palladian Ensemble	Hurdy-gurdy
1997	The Book of Secrets	Loreena McKennitt	Hurdy-gurdy, lira da braccio, rebec
1998	Green Electric	David Rice	Hurdy-gurdy
1999	Magic & Mayhem	Afro Celt Sound System	Hurdy-gurdy
1999	Volume 2: Release	Afro Celt Sound System	Hurdy-gurdy on "Release" and "Release It"
2000	OVO	Peter Gabriel	Hurdy-gurdy
2001	Volume 3: Further In Time	Afro Celt Sound System	Hurdy-gurdy on "North" and "Life Begins Again"
2003	Two Horizons	Moya Brennan	Hurdy-gurdy
2005	Volume 5: Anatomic	Afro Celt Sound System	Hurdy-gurdy
2006	An Ancient Muse	Loreena McKennitt	Hurdy-gurdy
2007	Nights from the Alhambra	Loreena McKennitt	Hurdy-gurdy
2007	The Imagined Village	The Imagined Village	Hurdy-gurdy
2009	True Stories	Martin Simpson	Hurdy-gurdy
2011	Mànran	Mànran	Composer
2018	Lost Souls	Loreena McKennitt	Hurdy-gurdy
