= Live in San Francisco at the Palace of Fine Arts =

Live in San Francisco

Live album by Loreena McKennitt
- Released: October 1995
- Recorded: San Francisco, May 19, 1994
- Genre: Folk, world music
- Length: 38:29
- Label: Quinlan Road
- Producer: Loreena McKennitt

Loreena McKennitt chronology
The Mask and Mirror (1994)	Live in San Francisco (1995)	A Winter Garden: Five Songs for the Season (1995)

Live in San Francisco at the Palace of Fine Arts is an EP of the Canadian singer, songwriter, accordionist, harpist, and pianist, Loreena McKennitt. It was recorded live in San Francisco during a concert at the Palace of Fine Arts, on 19 May 1994 and released 1 year later.

== Track listing ==
1. "The Mystic's Dream" – 7:24
2. "Santiago" – 5:24
3. "She Moved Through the Fair" – 5:37
4. "Between the Shadows" – 4:18
5. "The Stolen Child" - 5:29 (Promo CD)
6. "The Dark Night of the Soul" - 6:20 Promo CD)
7. "Marrakesh Night Market" - 6:44 (Promo CD)
8. "The Lady of Shalott" – 8:50
9. "The Bonny Swans" – 6:56
10. "Prospero‘s Speech" - 4:17 (Promo CD)
