= The Mummers' Dance =

1997 single by Loreena McKennitt

Single by Loreena McKennitt

from the album The Book of Secrets
- B-side: "The Mystic's Dream"; "Marrakesh Night Market" (live); "The Dark Night of the Soul" (live)
- Released: November 1997
- Genre: Celtic new-age
- Length: 6:08 (album version); 4:01 (single version)
- Label: Warner Bros.; Quinlan Road
- Songwriter: Loreena McKennitt
- Producers: Loreena McKennitt; Brian Hughes; Donald Quan

Loreena McKennitt singles chronology
"The Bonny Swans" (1995)	"The Mummers' Dance" (1997)	"Marco Polo" (1998)

Music video
- "The Mummers' Dance" on YouTube

"The Mummers' Dance" is a song written and performed by Canadian singer Loreena McKennitt, released as a single from her sixth studio album, The Book of Secrets (1997), in November 1997. Remixed by electronic music production duo DNA for its single release, "The Mummers' Dance" reached No. 10 in Canada, No. 18 on the US Billboard Hot 100, and No. 1 on the Billboard Triple-A chart. A music video was also produced for the song.

== Composition and lyrics ==
"The Mummers' Dance" is a Celtic new-age song, referring to the seasonal mummers' play performed by groups of actors, often as house-to-house visits. Its lyrics indicate a springtime holiday.

== Track listings ==
Canadian CD single
No.	Title	Length
1.	"The Mummers' Dance" (single version)	4:00
2.	"The Mummers' Dance" (album version)	6:08
3.	"The Mystic's Dream"	7:40
Total length:		17:48

CD maxi-single
No.	Title	Length
1.	"The Mummers' Dance" (single version)	4:00
2.	"The Mummers' Dance"	6:08
3.	"Marrakesh Night Market" (live)	6:44
4.	"The Dark Night of the Soul" (live)	6:20
Total length:		23:13

== Charts ==
=== Weekly charts ===
Weekly chart performance for "The Mummers' Dance"
Chart (1997–1998)	Peak position
Canada (The Record)	16
Canada Top Singles (RPM)	10
Canada Adult Contemporary (RPM)	1
US Billboard Hot 100	18
US Adult Contemporary (Billboard)	23
US Adult Top 40 (Billboard)	3
US Mainstream Top 40 (Billboard)	14
US Modern Rock Tracks (Billboard)	17
US Triple-A (Billboard)	1

=== Year-end charts ===
1998 year-end chart performance for "The Mummers' Dance"
Chart (1998)	Position
Canada Top Singles (RPM)	52
Canada Adult Contemporary (RPM)	17
US Billboard Hot 100	83
US Adult Top 40 (Billboard)	21
US Modern Rock Tracks (Billboard)	67
US Triple-A (Billboard)	12

2001 year-end chart performance for "The Mummers' Dance"
Chart (2001)	Position
Canada (Nielsen SoundScan)	128

2002 year-end chart performance for "The Mummers' Dance"
Chart (2002)	Position
Canada (Nielsen SoundScan)	118

== Release history ==
Release dates and formats for "The Mummers' Dance"
Region	Date	Format(s)	Label(s)	Ref.
United States	November 1997	Adult album alternative radio	Warner Bros.; Quinlan Road	
United States	December 9, 1997	Contemporary hit radio	Warner Bros.; Quinlan Road	
United States	February 17, 1998	CD; cassette	Warner Bros.; Quinlan Road	
