= Red Sky Performance =

Red Sky Performance is a Canadian indigenous dance, theatre, and music company, founded by artistic director Sandra Laronde in 2000. Red Sky Performance creates, produces and tours original work for adult and family audiences on local, national and international stages.

The company has been part of the Vancouver 2010 Cultural Olympiad, World Expo 2010 in Shanghai; the closing ceremonies of the Cultural Olympiad of the 2008 Beijing Olympics; the Meet in Beijing Festival; and the International Arts and Culture Festival in Inner Mongolia.

Red Sky Performance is the recipient of the 2010 Dora Mavor Moore Award for excellence in the performing arts, and two Dora Mavor Moore nominations (2006 and 2004). Most recently, Red Sky was nominated in three categories for the 2010 Canadian Aboriginal Music Awards for Tono, a dance and live music creation.
