= The Sinner's Redemption =

Christmas carol

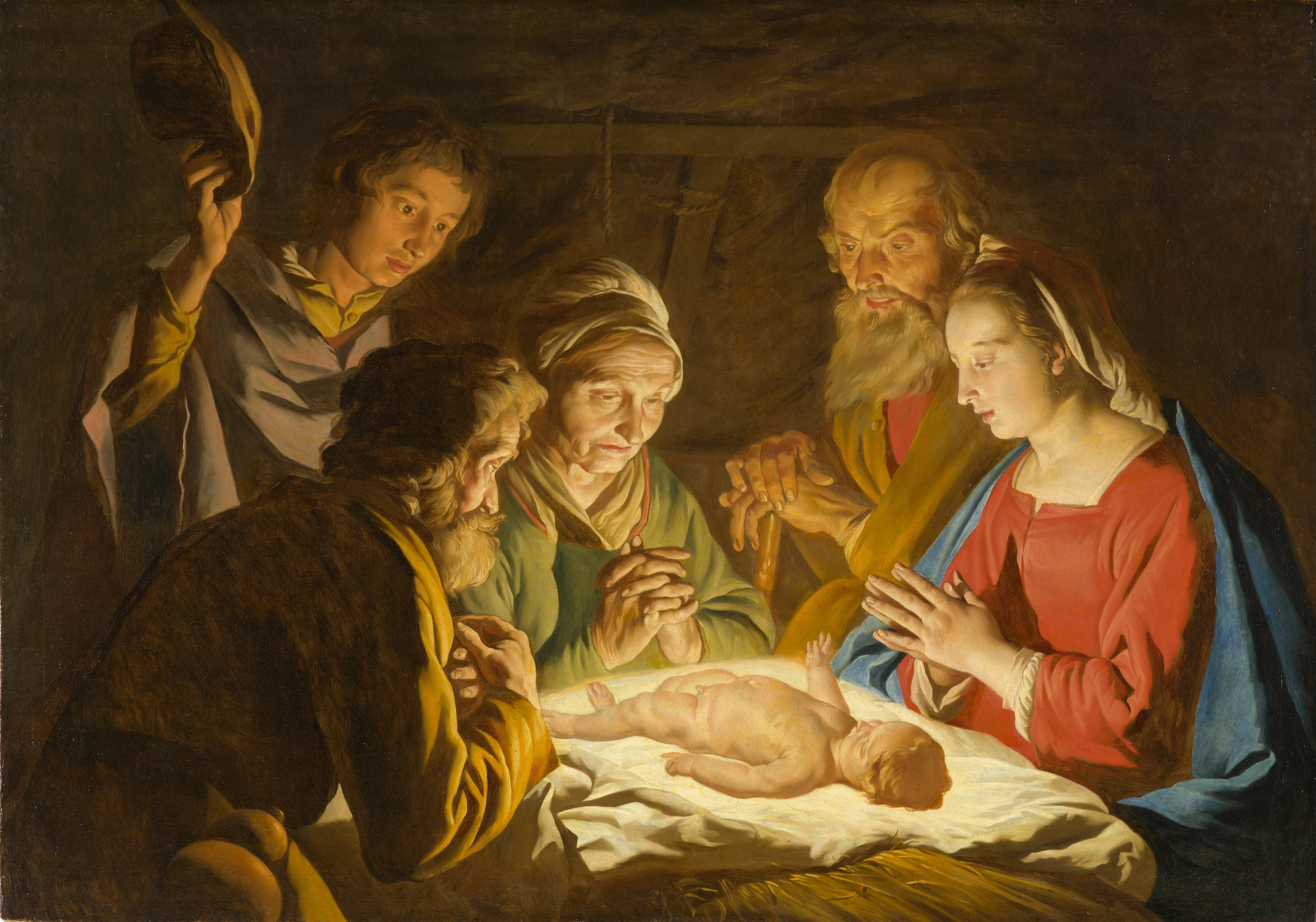
- The Nativity of Jesus
- Genre: Carol
- Occasion: Christmas

"The Sinner's Redemption", also known as "All You That are to Mirth Inclined", is an English Christmas carol originating in the 1600s. The carol is about the Nativity of Jesus. It is not known when "The Sinner's Redemption" was first created, though it was mentioned as having been sung in the 1630s in a broadside newspaper and was regularly reprinted by them.

== Background ==
Professor Peter Davidson of Oxford University claimed that the carol was written by Anna Alcox in the 1650s, but her name was not attributed to it as she was from a family of Catholic recusants; she was also six years old at the time of writing and was under the age of legal responsibility.

The oldest written copy of the carol was found in 1709 under the title "The Sinner's Redemption, The Nativity of our Lord & Saviour Jesus Christ, With His Life on Earth, and Precious Death on the Cross", in an undated collection by Thomas Deloney. In 1861, in his "A Garland of Christmas Carols", John Camden Hotten called it "this rude old carol" and stated it was a favourite of the peasantry. He also noted the regular reprints by broadsides.

== Contents ==
The 1709 copy of the carol has 28 verses, but the last 12 would often be omitted. The word "mirth" used in the carol was intended to represent Christian religious joy in celebrating the birth of Jesus rather than "boisterous merriment". "The Sinner's Redemption" was also viewed to have inspired the Irish "Wexford Carol", as five of the six verses of the latter carol were based on "The Sinner's Redemption". The carol was later adapted for formal congregational singing by Ralph Vaughan Williams in the Oxford Book of Carols.
