= God Rest Ye Merry, Gentlemen =

Christmas carol

- Genre: Christmas carol
- Written: Traditional
- Based on: Luke 2
- Meter: 8.6.8.6.8.6 with refrain

Music video
- "God Rest You Merry Gentlemen" (Lyrics) on YouTube

"God Rest You Merry, Gentlemen"
1917 Edison Records recording

"God Rest Ye Merry, Gentlemen", also known as "God Rest You Merry, Gentlemen", is an English traditional Christmas carol. It is in the Roxburghe Collection (iii. 452), and is listed as no. 394 in the Roud Folk Song Index. It is also known as "Tidings of Comfort and Joy," and by other variant incipits.

== History ==
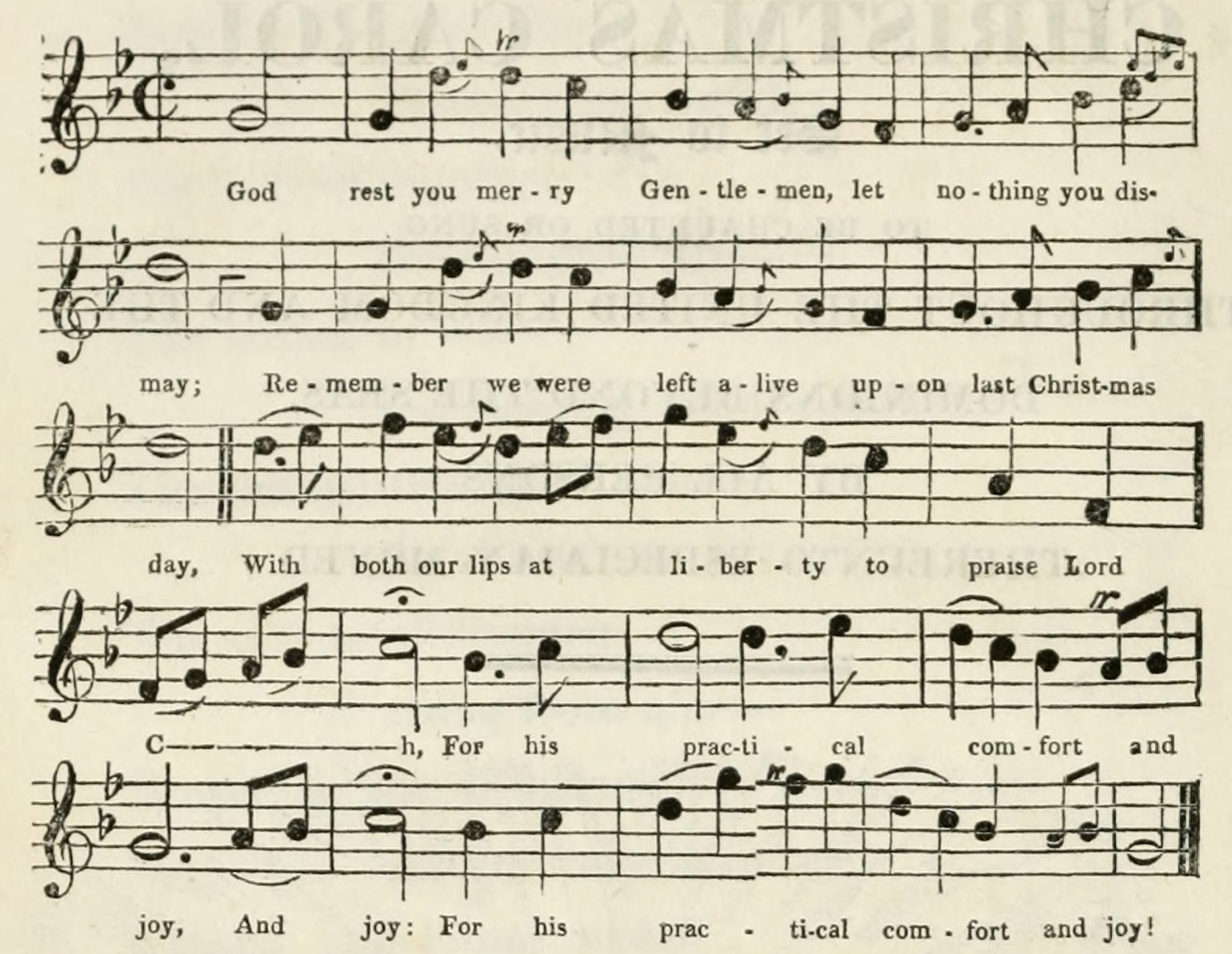
1827 publication of the melody, set to satirical lyrics by William Hone

The English solicitor and antiquarian William Sandys is responsible for the popularity of the carol, having included it in his publication Christmas Carols Ancient and Modern (London, Richard Beckley, 1833), a collection of carols that Sandys had gathered and also apparently improvised. An early version of the carol can be found in an anonymous manuscript dating from the 1650s. It contains a slightly different version of the first line from that found in later texts, namely "Sit yo^{w} merry gentlemen" (also transcribed "Sit you merry gentlemen" and "Sit yo^{u} merry gentlemen").

The earliest known printed edition of the carol is in a broadsheet dated to c. 1760. A precisely datable reference to the carol is found in the November 1764 edition of the Monthly Review. Some sources claim that the carol dates as far back as the 16th century and there is a surviving MS version from the 1650s. Others date it later, to the 18th or early 19th centuries.

Although there is a second tune known as "Cornish", in print by 1833, and referred to as "the usual version" in the 1928 Oxford Book of Carols this version is seldom heard today. The better-known traditional English melody is in the minor mode; the earliest printed edition of the melody appears to be in a rondo arrangement for fortepiano by Samuel Wesley, which was already reviewed in 1815. Soon after, it appeared in a parody published in 1820 by William Hone. It had been associated with the carol since at least the mid-18th century, when it was recorded by James Nares in a hand-written manuscript under the title "The old Christmas Carol". Hone's version of the tune differs from the present melody in the third line. The full current melody was published by Chappell in 1855.

An article in the March 1824 issue of The Gentleman's Magazine complains that, in London, no Christmas carols are heard "excepting some croaking ballad-singer bawling out 'God rest you, merry gentlemen', or a like doggerel". The carol is referred to in Charles Dickens' 1843 novella A Christmas Carol. It is also quoted in George Eliot's 1861 novel Silas Marner.

== Lyrics ==
The following version of the first verse is found in a manuscript dating from the early 1650s:

Sit yo^{w} merry Gentlemen
Let nothing you dismay
for Jesus Christ is borne
to save o^{r} soules from Satan's power
Whenas we runne astray
O tidings of comfort & joy
to save o^{r} soules from Satan
When as we runne away
O tidings of comfort & joy

A later version is found in Three New Christmas Carols, dated c. 1760. Its first verse reads:

God rest on merry, Gentlemen,
Let nothing you dismay,
Remember Christ our Saviour
Was born upon this Day.
To save poor souls from Satan's power,
Which long time had gone astray.
Which brings tidings of comfort and joy.

The historic meaning of the phrase "God rest you merry" is 'may God grant you peace and happiness'; the Oxford English Dictionary records uses of this phrase from 1534 onwards. It appears in Shakespeare's play As You Like It and the phrase "rest you merry" appears in Romeo and Juliet; both plays date from the 1590s. The ditransitive use of the verb rest in the sense "to keep, cause to continue, to remain" is typical of 16th- to 17th-century language. However, in the present day, merry is often misinterpreted as an adjective modifying gentlemen. Etymonline.com notes that the first line "often is mispunctuated" as "God rest you, merry gentlemen" because in contemporary language, rest has lost its use "with a predicate adjective following and qualifying the object" (Century Dictionary). This is the case already in the 1775 variant, and is also reflected by Dickens' replacement of the verb rest by bless in A Christmas Carol.

Some variants give the pronoun in the first line as ye instead of you, in a pseudo-archaism. In fact, ye would never have been correct, because ye is a subjective (nominative) pronoun only, never an objective (accusative) pronoun.

A variant text was printed in 1775 in The Beauties of the Magazines, and Other Periodical Works, Selected for a Series of Years. This text was reproduced from a song-sheet bought from a caroler in the street. This version is shown here alongside the version reported by W. B. Sandys (1833) and the version adopted by Carols for Choirs (OUP, 1961), which has become the de facto baseline reference in the UK.

The Beauties of the Magazines (1775)	Christmas Carols Ancient and Modern, W. B. Sandys (1833)	Carols for Choirs (1961)
1. God rest ye merry, gentlemen, Let nothing you dismay, Remember Christ our Saviour; Was born on Christmas-day; To save poor souls from Satan's power, Which long time had gone astray. And it is tidings of comfort and joy.	1. God rest you merry, gentlemen Let nothing you dismay For Jesus Christ, our Saviour; Was born upon this day, To save us all from Satan's power When we were gone astray. O tidings of comfort and joy, For Jesus Christ our Saviour was born on Christmas day.	1. God rest you merry, gentlemen, Let nothing you dismay, For Jesus Christ our Saviour; Was born upon this day, To save us all from Satan's power When we were gone astray: O tidings of comfort and joy, comfort and joy, O tidings of comfort and joy.
2. From God that is our Father; The blessed angels came Unto some certain shepherds, With tidings of the same; That he was born in Bethlehem; The Son of God by name. And it is, etc.	2. In Bethlehem, in Jewry; This blessed babe was born And laid within a manger Upon this blessed morn The which his mother Mary; Nothing did take in scorn.; O tidings, &c.	2. From God our heavenly Father; A blessed angel came, And unto certain shepherds Brought tidings of the same, How that in Bethlehem was born The Son of God by name: O tidings ...
3. Now when they came to Bethlehem, Where our sweet Saviour lay, They found him in a manger Where oxen feed on hay. The blessed Virgin kneeling down Unto the Lord did pray. And it is, etc.	3. From God our Heavenly Father; A blessed Angel came, And unto certain Shepherds; Brought tidings of the same, How that in Bethlehem was born The Son of God by name. O tidings, &c.	3. The shepherds at those tidings Rejoiced much in mind, And left their flocks a-feeding In tempest, storm and wind, And went to Bethlehem straightway, This blessed Babe to find: O tidings ...
4. With sudden joy and gladness, The shepherds were beguil'd, To see the Babe of Israel; Before his mother mild. O then with joy and cheerfulness Rejoice each mother's child. And it is, etc.	4. Fear not, then said the Angel, Let nothing you affright, This day is born a Saviour; Of virtue, power and might; So frequently to vanquish all The friends of Satan quite. O tidings, &c.	4. But when to Bethlehem they came, Whereat this Infant lay, They found Him in a manger, Where oxen feed on hay; His mother Mary kneeling, Unto the Lord did pray: O tidings ...
5. Now to the Lord sing praises, All you within this place Like we true loving brethren, Each other to embrace, For the merry time of Christmas; Is coming on a-pace. And it is, etc.	5. The Shepherds at those tidings Rejoiced much in mind, And left their flocks a feeding In tempest, storm and wind, And went to Bethlehem straightway, This blessed babe to find. O tidings, &c.	5. Now to the Lord sing praises, All you within this place, And with true love and brotherhood Each other now embrace; This holy tide of Christmas; All other doth deface: O tidings ...
<no further couplets>	6. But when to Bethlehem they came, Whereas this infant lay, They found him in a manger, Where oxen feed on hay, His mother Mary kneeling Unto the Lord did pray. O tidings, &c.: 7. Now to the Lord sing praises, All you within this place, And with true love and brotherhood Each other now embrace; This holy tide of Christmas; All other doth deface. O tidings, &c.	<no further couplets>

== Musical settings ==
- Gustav Holst includes the carol in his 1910 choral fantasy Christmas Day.
- The third movement of Victor Hely-Hutchinson's Carol Symphony (1927) is a scherzo on the tune of God Rest You Merry, Gentlemen.

== Versions by popular music artists ==
- American singer Bing Crosby recorded a version on June 8, 1942, which was released that same year on one side of a 10" 78 rpm shellac record and was later included in his 1945 compilation, Merry Christmas.
- US-American folk band Simon & Garfunkel recorded it as "Comfort & Joy", released later on the compilation Old Friends
- American rock band Steve Miller Band plays a snippet on the song "Good Morning" from the album Number 5 (1970)
- American singer Mariah Carey, on her 1994 album Merry Christmas, released on the international edition as a bonus track
- A remix of the song composed by Lee Jackson, titled "God Rest Ye, Deadly Gentlemen" appears in the 1995 video game Rise of the Triad. The song was later remade by Andrew Hulshult for the 2013 remaster.
- Canadian singer Loreena McKennitt, on A Winter Garden: Five Songs for the Season (1995)
- American country singer Garth Brooks (2000)
- American rock band Boston (2002), as "God Rest Ye Metal Gentlemen", released online and on a special tour edition of the album Life, Love & Hope.
- British rock band Jethro Tull, on The Jethro Tull Christmas Album (2003)
- The Canadian band Barenaked Ladies and singer-songwriter Sarah McLachlan, on the 2004 album Barenaked for the Holidays
- American contemporary Christian band MercyMe (2006)
- A heavy metal version of the song was recorded in 2008 by Ronnie James Dio, Tony Iommi, Rudy Sarzo, and Simon Wright in 2008 for the album We Wish You a Metal Xmas and a Headbanging New Year.
- American smooth jazz gospel singer Tim Bowman (2010)
- The cast of Glee (2010)
- Scottish singer Annie Lennox recorded a version of the song which was included on her 2010 album A Christmas Cornucopia
- American metalcore band August Burns Red (2011)
- American punk rock band Bad Religion, on their 2013 EP Christmas Songs
- Irish singer Hozier performed a cover on BBC Radio 1's Live Lounge in 2015.
- American acapella band Pentatonix, on the 2016 album A Pentatonix Christmas, and on the soundtrack of the 2018 animated film adaptation of The Grinch
- Christian band Tenth Avenue North with Sarah Reeves (2016)
- American singer Tinashe recorded a trap-pop–influenced version of the song, included on her 2020 Christmas EP Comfort & Joy
- American violinist Lindsey Stirling, on the 2022 album Snow Waltz
- American singer Debbie Gibson on her 2022 album Winterlicious
- American band The Milk Carton Kids on their 2024 album Christmas in a Minor Key

== See also ==
- List of Christmas carols
