= Haig Yazdjian =

Syrian-Greek musician

Haig Yazdjian is a Syrian-Greek composer, vocalist, Oud player, and producer. He was born in Aleppo, Syria in 1959. His parents are Armenians from Kayseri and Nevşehir in modern-day Turkey. For much of his life he has lived in Greece, which is where he began his interest in traditional Eastern music. His first album Nihavend Ionga was not that famous. But the second one TALAR, showed up in 1996 and accelerated his popularity.

Yazdjian played on Loreena McKennitt's 2006 album An Ancient Muse.

== Discography ==
- 1995: Nihavend Ionga. Label: FM Records
- 1996: Talar. Libra Music
- 1998: Garin. Libra Music
- 2001: Beast on the Moon. Label: Haig
- 2001: Yeraz The Master Oud Player. Label: WMI
- 2007: Amalur. Label: Libra Music
- 2009: Rhythm In Topkapı Palace Orient Percussion - Arras. Label: Jet Plak Kaset
- 2010: Imerologio. Warner
- 2011: Stou Tragoudiou Tin Ohthi No 6. Warner
