= The Highwayman (poem) =

1906 poem by Alfred Noyes

"The Highwayman"
Reading by Maria Falin

"The Highwayman" is a romantic ballad and narrative poem written by Alfred Noyes, first published in the August 1906 issue of Blackwood's Magazine, based in England. The following year it was included in Noyes' collection, Forty Singing Seamen and Other Poems, becoming an immediate success. In 1995 it was voted 15th in the BBC's poll for "The Nation's Favourite Poems".

== Plot ==
The poem, set in 18th-century rural England, tells the story of an unnamed highwayman who is in love with Bess, a landlord's daughter. Betrayed to the authorities by Tim, a jealous ostler, the highwayman escapes ambush when Bess sacrifices her life to warn him. Learning of her death, he is killed in a futile attempt at revenge ("so they shot him down on the highway, like a dog upon the highway"). In the final stanza, the ghosts of the lovers meet again on winter nights.

== Background ==
The poem was written on the edge of a desolate stretch of land known as Bagshot Heath in Surrey, where Noyes, then aged 24, had taken rooms in a cottage. In his autobiography, he recalled: "Bagshot Heath in those days was a wild bit of country, all heather and pinewoods. 'The Highwayman' suggested itself to me one blustery night when the sound of the wind in the pines gave me the first line." The poem was completed in about two days.

== Literary qualities ==
"The Highwayman" is reputed to be "the best ballad poem in existence for oral delivery". It makes use of vivid imagery to describe surroundings ("the road was a gipsy's ribbon, looping the purple moor -") and repetitious phrases to emphasise action ("A red-coat troop came marching - marching - marching -"). Almost half a century later, Noyes wrote, "I think the success of the poem... was because it was not an artificial composition, but was written at an age when I was genuinely excited by that kind of romantic story."

== Literary techniques ==
"The Highwayman" uses hexameter that mixes iambs and anapaests. The rhythm is suggestive of the foot falls of a galloping horse. Noyes frequently uses alliteration, such as the phrase "ghostly galleon", and also uses refrains in each stanza. The genre of this poem seems to be a romance, but like Romeo and Juliet, the poem is a tragedy in the end. This poem can also be called a ballad.

== Adaptations and use in popular culture ==
- In 1933, a setting of the poem for chorus and small orchestra by the English composer C. Armstrong Gibbs received its first performance at Winchester College Music School.
- In 1944, the poem was adapted into an episode of the romance and adventure radio show "Dangerously Yours", starring Victor Jory and sponsored by the Vicks chemical company.
- In 1951, the poem was used as the basis for a feature-length Hollywood film of the same name, starring Philip Friend and Wanda Hendrix. Noyes writes in his autobiography that he was pleasantly surprised by "the fact that in this picture, produced in Hollywood, the poem itself is used and followed with the most artistic care".
- The poem was featured in the February 10, 1957 broadcast of the CBS Radio Workshop, narrated by William Conrad, with an orchestral soundtrack by Jerry Goldsmith.
- The poem is referenced in parody form in the 1959 radio episode of Hancock's Half Hour "The Poetry Society". "He wore a French cocked hat on his forehead/And a bunch of lace at his chin/And the highwayman came riding/With his whiskers soaked in gin."
- In 1965, American folksinger Phil Ochs set the poem to music on his second album, I Ain't Marching Any More. His arrangement has since been covered by other musicians.
- Cult British singer-songwriter John Otway adapted the poem as a rock song on his 1979 album Where Did I Go Right?.
- In 1981, Oxford University Press published an edition of the poem illustrated by Charles Keeping in black and white. He won the annual Kate Greenaway Medal from the Library Association, recognising the year's best children's book illustration by a British subject.
- In the 1985 film Anne of Green Gables, the main character Anne Shirley recites the poem at a concert at which it is very well received.
- The Scottish children's author Nicola Morgan used the poem as the background for her historical novels, The Highwayman's Footsteps and The Highwayman's Curse.
- One of the videos to the 1987 hit pop song "Everywhere" by the rock band Fleetwood Mac is based on this poem.
- The 1996 book Angela’s Ashes mentioned it briefly after a sick, 14-year-old girl tells poems to the protagonist, Frank McCourt.
- The Canadian singer Loreena McKennitt adapted it as a folk song on her 1997 album The Book of Secrets.
- The 2009 anthology How Beautiful the Ordinary contains a short story by Margo Lanagan titled A Dark Red Love Knot based on the poem.
- It inspired the 2011 illustrated children's book The Highway Rat by Julia Donaldson.
