= Donald Quan =

Canadian composer

Donald Quan (born 1962) is a Canadian composer of film and world music, best known for writing the scores to television shows Relic Hunter and Mutant X.

== Career ==
Born in Toronto, Ontario, and schooled at the Berklee College of Music in Boston, Quan was the recipient of the Joe Venuti scholarship for stringed instrument performance. After Quan left college, he ventured into pop/rock music with the Canadian rock band Lighthouse and played with them for three years.

In 1988, Quan joined the Canadian rock group Eye Eye as a keyboardist and violist. He also performed as a multi-instrumentalist with the performance artist Meryn Cadell, the Celtic-rock band Enter the Haggis, alt-rock band Cliché Verre and Juno nominated Afro-Canadian pop ensemble Kaleefah.

Quan has been a long-time band member of Canadian singer Loreena McKennitt and has assisted in the production of several studio albums and recordings including the acclaimed The Book of Secrets.

Quan collapsed onstage on Saturday, August 8, 2009, playing keyboards with Derek Miller in Kitchener, Ontario, for the Kitchener Bluesfest. He has since fully recovered.

Since 2007, Donald Quan's music shop of musical instrument curiosities MUSIDEUM has become known as a premiere concert venue for all genres of music from all over the world.

== Music for film and television ==
Quan's film music company Q Music Inc. has provided music services to hundreds of television, film, radio and multi-media productions including the popular television shows Relic Hunter (starring Tia Carrere for Fireworks Entertainment), Mutant X (Tribune Entertainment), Tracker (starring Adrian Paul for Lions Gate), Starhunter, and The War Next Door, the notable Aboriginal TV drama Moccasin Flats as well as feature films Expecting, and Eve. Other notable projects include scoring the four-part documentary China Rises for CBC, one of the first HD-TV projects for the network. Quan is also responsible for the well recognized world music-tinged theme for CBC Radio's Metro Morning.

Recently (2020) Quan scored the feature documentary Gods In Shackles (with Janal Bechthold), and 3 Holiday MOVs Mistletoe Magic, A Very Corgi Christmas and Christmas By Chance (with Jim Gelcer).

In 2019, he scored the documentaries My Farmland (CBC) and Running Home and the social feature documentary Queer Cooli-tudes.

In 2020, his scoring projects include Herstory (PBS).

== Music style ==
Donald Quan is especially well known for his diverse work in the area of contemporary World Music. The Q Music studios house an instrument collection of over 400 indigenous instruments from 6 continents. His CDs Tear of the Sun (with Ron Korb) and Invocata (recorded at Real World Studios) have garnered acclaim worldwide. Quan has toured China and Japan with longtime collaborators Ron Korb and George Gao playing music dubbed New Chinese Jazz, a blend of jazz improvisation and traditional Chinese melodies.

Quan has left his mark on the Canadian world music scene by collaborating with organizations such as the Toronto Tabla Ensemble, Brazilian-influenced percussion group Samba Squad, M-Do Kathak Dance Company and renowned First Nations choreographer Santee Smith (Kaha:wi Dance Theatre).

Aboriginal music has always been a passion of Donald Quan and he has contributed greatly to the Canadian Aboriginal music scene. He has collaborated with theatrical company Red Sky Performance, Santee Smith, Kahawii Dance Theatre, created theme music for APTN and has composed numerous film scores for Big Soul Productions including the series By The Rapids and Moccasin Flats, for which he was nominated for a Gemini award for "Best score in a dramatic series". He has worked intimately with Aboriginal recording artists for 10 years as musical director for the annual Canadian Aboriginal Music Awards. He has been a full-time member of the Derek Miller Band and has recently taught a course on film music composition on Manitoulin Island as part of the Weengushk organization. As acknowledgement for his contributions, Quan was honoured in 2007 with the Music Industry Award at the 9th annual Canadian Aboriginal Music Awards.

== Awards and nominations ==
Gemini Award Nomination 2002: Best Original Music Score for a Dramatic Series: Relic Hunter

Gemini Award Nomination 2003: Best Original Music Score for a Dramatic Series: Mutant X

Gemini Award Nomination 2006: Best Original Music Score for a Dramatic Series: Moccasin Flats Season III – The Other Side

Gemini Award Nomination 2006: Best Original Music Score for a Documentary Program or Series: The In between World of M.G. Vassanji

SOCAN International Television Series Award (2007/2006/2004): Relic Hunter

Canadian Aboriginal Music Awards: Music Industry Award (2006)

Canadian Aboriginal Music Awards Nomination: Best Score in an Aboriginal film/television program (2008)

== Selected discography ==
The Relaxations of Katt
Q Music 2017
Donald Quan - Composer, Performer

17 Minutes of Sleep
Toronto Rehab Foundation 2010
Donald Quan - Composer, Performer

Solitudes – Zen of Sleep
Somerset 2007
Donald Quan - Composer, Performer

Solitudes – Zen Relaxation
Somerset 2006
Donald Quan - Composer, Performer

Solitudes – Mysterious Places
Somerset 2006
Donald Quan - Composer, Performer

Hallmark - Feng Shui
Somerset 2006
Donald Quan - Composer, Performer

Ron Korb/ Donald Quan - Seasons
Humble Dragon 2005
Donald Quan - Composer, Performer, Producer (with Ron Korb)

Solitudes - Asian Spa
Somerset 2004
Donald Quan - Composer, Performer

Ron Korb - Celtic Heartland
Humble Dragon 2000
Donald Quan - Producer

Loreena McKennitt - Live In Paris And Toronto
Quinlan Road 1999
Donald Quan - Multi-Instrumentalist

Loreena McKennitt - Book of Secrets
Quinlan/Warner 1997
(Recorded at Peter Gabriel's Real World Studios)
Donald Quan - Multi-Instrumentalist/Assistant to Producer

Loreena McKennitt - A Winter Garden
Quinlan/Warner 1996
Donald Quan - Multi-Instrumentalist

Myakudo Taiko (Traditional Japanese Music)
Independent 1992
Donald Quan - Producer

Donald Quan - Invocata
Oasis 1990
Donald Quan Composer, Performer

Carol Lipson - Try And Imagine
Donald Quan - Producer/Arranger
