= Loreena McKennitt =

Canadian musician (born 1957)

Loreena McKennitt OC OM CD
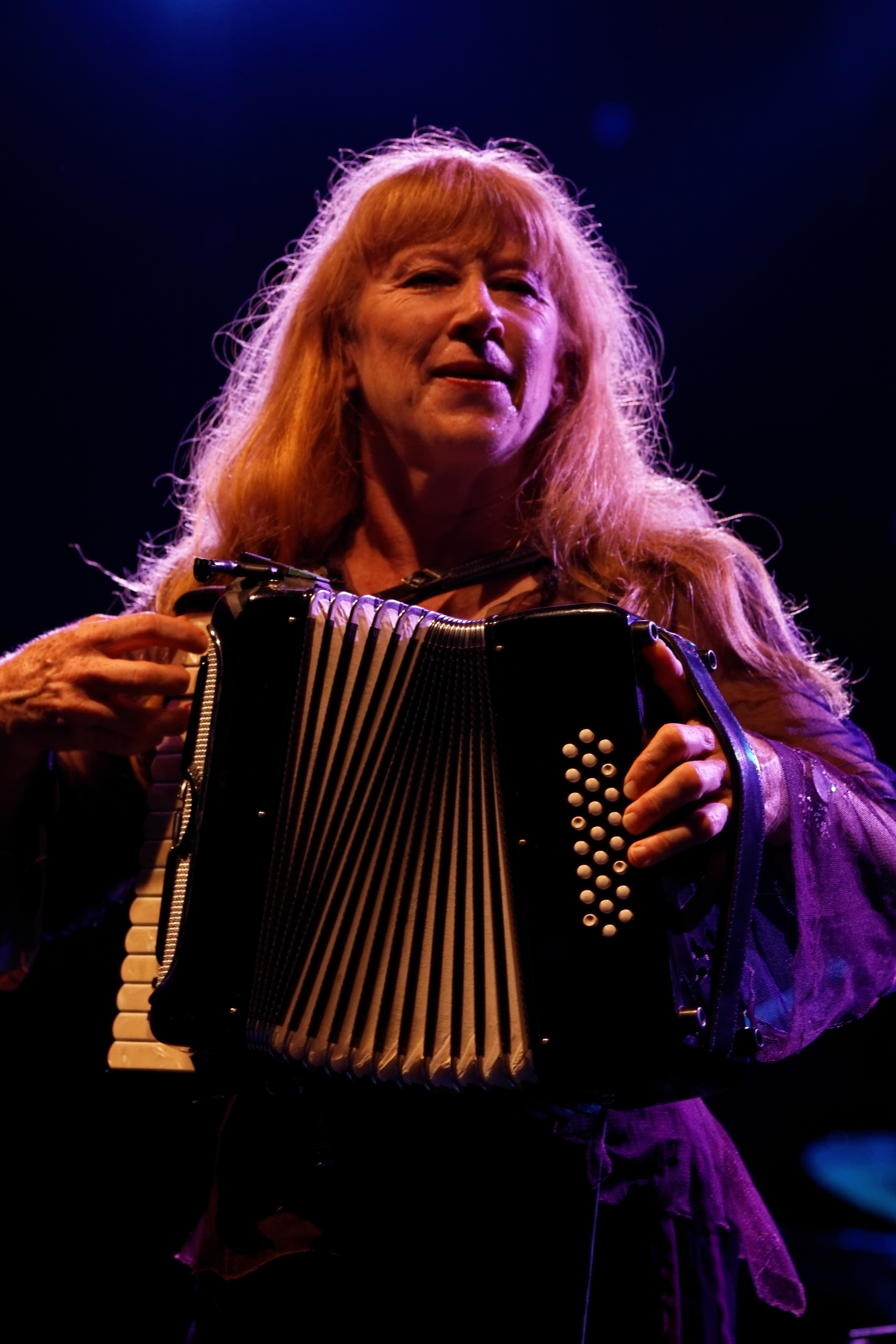
- McKennitt performing in 2012

Background information
- Born: Loreena McKennitt; February 17, 1957 (age 69); Morden, Manitoba, Canada
- Origin: Stratford, Ontario, Canada
- Genres: Celtic fusion; world; new-age
- Occupations: Musician; singer-songwriter; producer; composer
- Instruments: Vocals; piano; harp; accordion
- Years active: 1985–1998, 2006–present
- Labels: Quinlan Road; Warner Bros.; Verve Forecast/Universal
- Website: loreenamckennitt.com

Loreena McKennitt OC OM CD (born February 17, 1957) is a Canadian singer-songwriter, multi-instrumentalist, and composer who writes, records, and performs world music with Celtic and Middle Eastern influences. McKennitt is known for her refined and clear soprano vocals. She has sold more than 16 million records worldwide.

== Early life and education ==
McKennitt was born in Morden, Manitoba, of Irish and Scottish descent to parents Jack McKennitt (died 1992) and Irene née Dickey (1931–2011). In Morden, she developed her love for music, influenced, in part, by the musical traditions of the local Mennonite community.

McKennitt enrolled at the University of Manitoba in Winnipeg to become a veterinarian. While in Winnipeg she discovered folk music, including fellow Canadians Neil Young, Joni Mitchell, and Gordon Lightfoot. After performing at the inaugural Winnipeg Folk Festival in 1974, McKennitt developed an interest in Celtic music and visited Ireland to hear it for herself. She learned to play the Celtic harp and began busking at various places, including St. Lawrence Market in Toronto to earn money to record her first album.

In 1981, she moved to Stratford, Ontario to join the Stratford Festival acting company; she still resides there.

== Career ==
=== Initial success: 1985–1998 ===
McKennitt's first album, Elemental, was released in 1985, followed by To Drive the Cold Winter Away (1987), Parallel Dreams (1989), The Visit (1991), The Mask and Mirror (1994), A Winter Garden (1995), and The Book of Secrets (1997). All of her work is released under her own label, Quinlan Road.

In 1990, McKennitt provided the music for the National Film Board of Canada documentary The Burning Times, a feminist revisionist account of the Early Modern European witchcraft trials. She and the musical team she headed would later re-record the documentary's main theme on her album The Visit under the title "Tango to Evora".

In 1993, she toured Europe supporting Mike Oldfield. In 1995, her version of the traditional Irish song "Bonny Portmore" was featured in the Highlander series, followed by the 1994 film Highlander 3: The Sorcerer. McKennitt's single "The Mummers' Dance" received airplay in North American markets during the spring of 1997, and was used as the theme song for the short-lived TV series Legacy. It also saw use in the trailer for a wide-release 1998 Drew Barrymore film Ever After.

Her music appeared in the movies The Santa Clause, Soldier, Jade, Holy Man, The Mists of Avalon, and Tinker Bell. It was also featured in the television series Roar, Due South, and Full Circle (Women and Spirituality).

=== Personal tragedy and hiatus ===
In July 1998, McKennitt's fiancé Ronald Rees, his brother Richard, and their close friend Gregory Cook drowned in a boating accident on Georgian Bay. She was deeply affected by the event, and she founded the Cook-Rees Memorial Fund for Water Search and Safety in the same year. At the time of the incident, she was working on a live album of two performances called Live in Paris and Toronto. The proceeds from this album were donated to the newly created memorial fund, totalling some three million dollars.

After the release of the live album, McKennitt decided that she would substantially reduce the number of her public performances, and she did not release any new recordings.

=== Return to music: 2006–present ===
During 2005, McKennitt began working on the album An Ancient Muse, her seventh full-length studio album, released in November 2006. In September 2006, she performed live at the Alhambra in Spain. The performance premiered on PBS and in August 2007 was released on a three-disc DVD/CD set titled Nights from the Alhambra.

In 2008, McKennitt wrote and composed "To the Fairies They Draw Near" for the theme song for Disney's direct-to-video animated film Tinker Bell. She also provided the narration for the film.

In early 2008, she returned to Peter Gabriel's Real World Studios to record A Midwinter Night's Dream, an extended version of her 1995 mini-album A Winter Garden: Five Songs for the Season. The album was released on October 28, 2008.

Since the release of An Ancient Muse, McKennitt has toured consistently, in Europe and North American, including the An Ancient Muse tour in 2007, another extensive tour across Canada and United States later in 2007, a tour of Europe in 2008 and a Mediterranean tour in 2009 with stops in Greece, Turkey, Cyprus, Lebanon, Hungary and Italy.

On September 17, 2009, McKennitt announced the release of a two-disc album, A Mediterranean Odyssey. The first CD, "From Istanbul to Athens", consisted of 10 new live recordings from her 2009 Mediterranean tour, including songs she had never before recorded in concert. The second CD, "The Olive and the Cedar", had a Mediterranean theme which McKennitt herself curated. It contained previously released studio recordings created between 1994 and 2006.

November 16, 2010, saw the US release (November 12 for Europe) of McKennitt's studio album, The Wind That Shakes the Barley. Recorded at the Sharon Temple in Ontario, the album comprises nine traditional Celtic songs.

When McKennitt released The Wind that Shakes the Barley she visited several countries to help promote the album. During the promotional tour she performed an hour-long concert in the studios of German radio station SWR1, accompanied only by Brian Hughes (guitars) and Caroline Lavelle (cello) who have long been part of her tours and recordings. This live concert was released on CD in 2011. Called Troubadours on the Rhine, the album was nominated for a 2012 Grammy for Best New Age Album.

On November 30, 2012, McKennitt lent her support to Kate Winslet's Golden Hat Foundation together with Tim Janis, Sarah McLachlan, Andrea Corr, Hayley Westenra, the Sleepy Man Banjo Boys, Dawn Kenney, Jana Mashonee, Amy Petty, and a choir, along with others, performing on "The American Christmas Carol" concert at Carnegie Hall.

McKennitt's 10th studio album, Lost Souls, was released on May 11, 2018. She planned a tour to support the album's release in 2018 and 2019.

She had a small acting role in the 2018 film Road to the Lemon Grove, as the voice of God.

In 2019, McKennitt released the live album Live at the Royal Albert Hall, recorded earlier that year in London.

== Legacy ==
=== Genre ===
McKennitt's music has generally been classified as World or Celtic music even though it contains aspects and characteristics of music from around the globe and is sometimes classified as folk music in record stores.

McKennitt is occasionally compared to Enya, but McKennitt's music is more grounded in traditional and classical invocations, using literary works as sources of lyrics and springboards for interpretation such as "The Lady of Shalott" by Lord Tennyson, "Prospero's Speech" (the final soliloquy in William Shakespeare's The Tempest), the Northumbrian murder ballad "The Twa Sisters" (which inspired "The Bonny Swans" on The Mask and Mirror), "Snow" by Archibald Lampman, "Dark Night of the Soul" by St. John of the Cross, Dante's Inferno, William Blake's "Lullaby", Yeats' "The Stolen Child," "The English Ladye and the Knight" by Sir Walter Scott, and "The Highwayman" by Alfred Noyes.

=== Influences ===
Before McKennitt composes any music, she engages in considerable research on a specific subject which then forms the general concept of the album. Before creating Elemental and Parallel Dreams, she travelled to Ireland for inspiration from the country's history, folklore, geography and culture. The album The Mask and Mirror was preceded by research in Spain where she studied Galicia, a Celtic section of Spain, along with its abundant Arabic roots. The result was an album that included elements of Celtic and Arabic music. According to the jacket notes, her album An Ancient Muse was inspired by travels among and reading about the various cultures along the Silk Road.

=== Documentaries ===
Late in the 1990s, McKennitt created No Journey's End, a half-hour documentary, for American television in which she discussed the influences behind her music. No Journey's End contained excerpts from several songs from the albums Parallel Dreams, The Visit, and The Mask and Mirror. It also shows live performances of the songs "The Lady of Shalott", "Santiago", and "The Dark Night of the Soul". It was later released on DVD and VHS, the former also containing music videos for "The Mummers' Dance" and "The Bonny Swans." A bonus copy of the DVD was included with the 2004 remastered versions of McKennitt's CDs.

In 2008, McKennitt released A Moveable Musical Feast, based on her 2007 An Ancient Muse tour. The DVD included interviews with McKennitt, her band, crew, fans and professional colleagues from the Canadian music industry.

=== Court case ===
In 2005, McKennitt was involved in an acrimonious court case in England when her former friend and employee, Niema Ash, published a book, Travels with Loreena McKennitt: My Life as a Friend, that contained intimate details of their friendship. McKennitt argued that much of the book contained confidential personal information that Ash had no right to publish. The English courts found that there had indeed been a breach of confidence and a misuse of McKennitt's private information, and the case set important precedents in the law of England and Wales on the privacy of public figures. The House of Lords affirmed the lower court's decisions in 2007.

== Honours ==
- Juno Award, Best Roots/Traditional Album 1992, for The Visit
- Juno Award, Best Roots/Traditional Album 1994, for The Mask and Mirror
- Billboard Music Award for International Achievement, 1997
- Honorary Doctor of Letters, Wilfrid Laurier University, 2002
- Honorary Doctor of Laws, University of Manitoba, June 2005
- Canadian Ambassador, Hans Christian Andersen Bicentenary, June 2005
- Honorary Doctor of Laws, Queen's University, October 2005
- Investiture as Honorary Colonel, 435 Transport and Rescue Squadron, Royal Canadian Air Force, December 2006
- Nominated for a Grammy award, Best Contemporary World Music Album, in 2007
- Western Canadian Music Awards Lifetime Achievement Award, September 2009
- Performed at Vancouver 2010 Winter Olympics, Opening Ceremonies, February 12, 2010
- Honorary Bachelor of Applied Business, George Brown College, June 2010
- Nominated for a Grammy award, Best New Age Album, in 2012
- Appointment as Honorary Colonel of the Royal Canadian Air Force, September 2014
- Inductee, Canadian Songwriters Hall of Fame, 2023
- Joseph-Elzéar Bernier Medal, Royal Canadian Geographical Society, 2023
- Paul Harris Fellow, Rotary International, 2025
- Inductee, Canadian Music Hall of Fame, 2025

== Awards and decorations ==
McKennitt's personal awards and decorations include the following:

Ribbon	Description	Notes
	Order of Canada (OC)	Appointed Officer (OC) April 17, 2026
	Order of Canada (CM)	Appointed Member (CM) on May 13, 2004
	Order of Manitoba (OM)	Appointed (OM) on July 15, 2003; medal number: 056
	Queen Elizabeth II Golden Jubilee Medal	Decoration awarded in 2002; Canadian version
	Queen Elizabeth II Diamond Jubilee Medal	Decoration awarded in 2012; Canadian version
	Canadian Forces' Decoration (CD)	December 14, 2019.; 12 years service in the Canadian Armed Forces.
	Ordre des Arts et des Lettres	Appointed Officer on April 20, 2025.; Republic of France
	Ordre des Arts et des Lettres	Appointed Knight on 2013.; Republic of France

== Quinlan Road ==
Quinlan Road
- Founded: 1985
- Founder: Loreena McKennitt
- Genre: Folk, Celtic, world, new-age
- Country of origin: Canada
- Official website: www.quinlanroad.com

Quinlan Road is an independent record label founded in 1985 and based in Stratford, Ontario, Canada. It is owned and operated by its sole artist, Loreena McKennitt. Quinlan Road started out at McKennitt's home where she sold recordings by mail order. Today Quinlan Road music is distributed internationally by Universal Music Group.

== Discography ==
=== Studio albums ===
Year	Album details	Peak chart positions				Certifications (sales threshold)
Year	Album details	CAN	AUS	GER	US	Certifications (sales threshold)
1985	Elemental: Release date: 1985; Label: Quinlan Road	—	—	—	—	
1987	To Drive the Cold Winter Away: Release date: January 11, 1987; Label: Quinlan Road	—	—	—	—	
1989	Parallel Dreams: Release date: March 7, 1989; Label: Quinlan Road	—	—	—	—	
1991	The Visit: Release date: November 1, 1991; Label: Quinlan Road, Warner Bros. (US)	28	—	—	—	BR: Gold; CAN: 4× Platinum; US: Gold
1994	The Mask and Mirror: Release date: March 22, 1994; Label: Quinlan Road, Warner Bros. (US)	4	21	18	143	ARG: Gold; AUS: Platinum; CAN: 3× Platinum; US: Gold
1997	The Book of Secrets: Release date: September 30, 1997; Label: Quinlan Road, Warner Bros. (US)	3	33	7	17	ARG: Gold; AUS: Gold; CAN: 4× Platinum; US: 2× Platinum; GER: Gold
2006	An Ancient Muse: Release date: November 21, 2006; Label: Quinlan Road, MRA	9	—	15	83	CAN: Platinum
2008	A Midwinter Night's Dream: Release date: October 28, 2008; Label: Quinlan Road, Universal	12	—	27	140	
2010	The Wind That Shakes the Barley: Release date: November 12, 2010; Label: Quinlan Road	13	—	28	141	
2018	Lost Souls: Release date: May 11, 2018; Label: Quinlan Road	14	—	5	164	
"—" denotes releases that did not chart

=== Live albums ===
Year	Album details	Peak chart positions			Certifications (sales threshold)
Year	Album details	CAN	GER	US	Certifications (sales threshold)
1995	Live in San Francisco at the Palace of Fine Arts: Release date: October 1995; Label: Quinlan Road	—	—	—	
1999	Live in Paris and Toronto: Release date: September 22, 1999; Label: Quinlan Road	—	65	—	
2007	Nights from the Alhambra: Release date: August 21, 2007; Label: Quinlan Road, Verve	—	11	190	AUS: Gold; GER: Platinum
2009	A Mediterranean Odyssey: Release date: October 20, 2009; Label: Quinlan Road	11	—	—	
2012	Troubadours on the Rhine: Release date: 2012; Label: Quinlan Road	16	32	—	
2019	Live at the Royal Albert Hall: Release date: November 1, 2019; Label: Quinlan Road	—	76	—	
2022	Under a Winter's Moon: Release date: November 18, 2022; Label: Quinlan Road	—	41	—	
2024	The Road Back Home: Release date: March 8, 2024; Label: Quinlan Road	—	9	—	
2025	Live in Madrid 2024: Release date: November 21, 2025; Label: Quinlan Road				
"—" denotes releases that did not chart

=== EPs ===
Year	EP details	Peak chart positions		Certifications (sales threshold)
Year	EP details	CAN	AUS	Certifications (sales threshold)
1995	A Winter Garden: Five Songs for the Season: Release date: November 1995; Label: Quinlan Road, Warner Bros. (US)	44	93	CAN: Gold

=== Compilations ===
Year	Album details	Peak chart positions
Year	Album details	GER
2009	A Mummers' Dance Through Ireland: Release date: 2009; Label: Quinlan Road	—
2013	The Journey So Far – The Best of Loreena McKennitt: Release date: 2013; Label: Quinlan Road	20
"—" denotes releases that did not chart

=== Boxed sets ===
Year	Album details
2008	The Journey Begins: Release date: 2008; Label: Quinlan Road

=== Singles ===
Year	Single	Peak chart positions				Album
Year	Single	CAN	US	US AC	US Pop	Album
1991	"The Lady of Shalott"	—	—	—	—	The Visit
1991	"All Souls Night"	—	—	—	—	The Visit
1991	"Courtyard Lullaby"	—	—	—	—	The Visit
1993	"Greensleeves"	—	—	—	—	The Visit
1994	"The Bonny Swans"	75	—	—	—	The Mask and Mirror
1994	"Santiago"	—	—	—	—	The Mask and Mirror
1994	"The Dark Night of the Soul"	—	—	—	—	The Mask and Mirror
1995	"The Mystic's Dream"	—	—	—	—	The Mask and Mirror
1995	"God Rest Ye Merry, Gentlemen"	—	—	—	—	A Winter Garden: Five Songs for the Season
1997	"The Mummers' Dance"	10	18	23	14	The Book of Secrets
1998	"Marco Polo"	—	—	—	—	The Book of Secrets
2006	"Caravanserai"	—	—	—	—	An Ancient Muse
2007	"Penelope's Song"	—	—	—	—	An Ancient Muse
2008	"The Seven Rejoices of Mary"	—	—	—	—	A Midwinter's Night Dream
2008	"Noël Nouvelet!"	—	—	—	—	A Midwinter's Night Dream
2009	"Dante's Prayer"	—	—	—	—	The Book of Secrets
2017	"Breaking of the Sword"	50	—	—	—	Lost Souls
"—" denotes releases that did not chart

=== Videos ===
- The Bonny Swans (1994)
- The Mummers' Dance (1997)
- Nights from the Alhambra (2007, live concert in Spain premiered on PBS)
- A Moveable Musical Feast (2008, a tour documentary from McKennitt's 2007 North American Tour)

=== Other ===
- No Journey's End (half-hour profile, aired on PBS; DVD)
- Heaven on Earth (TV movie 1987 – played "Lady Traveler")
- Highlander III: The Sorcerer (Soundtrack contribution)
- The Santa Clause (Soundtrack contribution, "The Bells of Christmas")
- Léolo (Soundtrack contribution)
- Una casa con vista al mar (Soundtrack contribution)
- The Mists of Avalon (Soundtrack use)
- The Burning Times (Soundtrack contribution)
- Due South (Soundtrack use)
- Northern Exposure (Soundtrack use)
- Tinker Bell (Direct-to-DVD movie, 2008 – Narrator)
- Soldier (Soundtrack use)

== See also ==
- Eileen McGann – fellow Irish-Canadian female Celtic folksinger. During McKennitt's early career McGann played many of the same venues, and they appeared together on several early compilation recordings.
- List of ambient music artists
