= Brian Hughes (musician) =

Canadian guitarist (born 1955)

- Born: 5 May 1955 (age 71); Vegreville, Alberta, Canada
- Genres: Smooth jazz, Latin, Jazz fusion, New age
- Occupations: Musician, composer, producer
- Instruments: Guitar, oud, bouzouki, electric sitar
- Years active: 1990–present
- Labels: Justin Time, Higher Octave, Sylvan House
- Website: brianhughes.com

Brian Hughes (born 5 May 1955) is a Canadian guitarist whose work draws from smooth jazz and Latin music. Hughes also plays oud, bouzouki, and balalaika. For over twenty years, he has worked in the studio with singer-songwriter Loreena McKennitt. He co-produced many of her recordings and leads her touring band.

== Music career ==
Hughes grew up in Alberta, Canada and studied at Grant MacEwan College (now MacEwan University) in Edmonton and the Banff School of Fine Arts with jazz guitarists Ed Bickert and Gene Bertoncini. In 1981 he moved temporarily to Los Angeles where he studied at the Guitar Institute with Pat Martino, Joe Diorio, and Robben Ford.

In 1987 Hughes moved to Toronto where he began working with harpist Loreena McKennitt. In 1990 he recorded Between Dusk...and Dreaming, his first album as a leader, for Justin Time Records, followed by Under One Sky, two years later. He started his label, Sylvan House Music, which was distributed by Warner Music Canada and licensed to Higher Octave Music/EMI in the U.S. and abroad. He recorded three more albums (Straight to You, One 2 One, and Shakin' Not Stirred) under this arrangement before releasing Along the Way with A440 Music Group in 2003. He returned to his Sylvan House Music imprint for the release of Live (2007), No Reservations (concert DVD, 2009), and Fast Train to a Quiet Place in 2011. He moved to Los Angeles in 2000. Many of his works can be heard on The Weather Channel's Local on the 8's, SiriusXM's Watercolors channel, and on the Music Choice Smooth Jazz channel.

== Awards and honors ==
Hughes received the Society of Canadian Authors and Composers (SOCAN) Jazz and Instrumental Composer of the Year award from 1997 to 2001 and in 2006 and 2008. He was nominated for a Juno Award as Producer of the Year in 1991 for Loreena McKennitt's album The Visit.

== Discography ==
- Between Dusk...and Dreaming (Justin Time, 1990)
- Under One Sky (Justin Time, 1992)
- Straight to You (Higher Octave, 1996)
- One 2 One (Higher Octave, 1998)
- Shakin' Not Stirred (Higher Octave, 1999)
- Along the Way (A440 Music Group)
- Live (Sylvan House, 2007)
- Fast Train to a Quiet Place (Sylvan House, 2011)
