= Block Out discography =

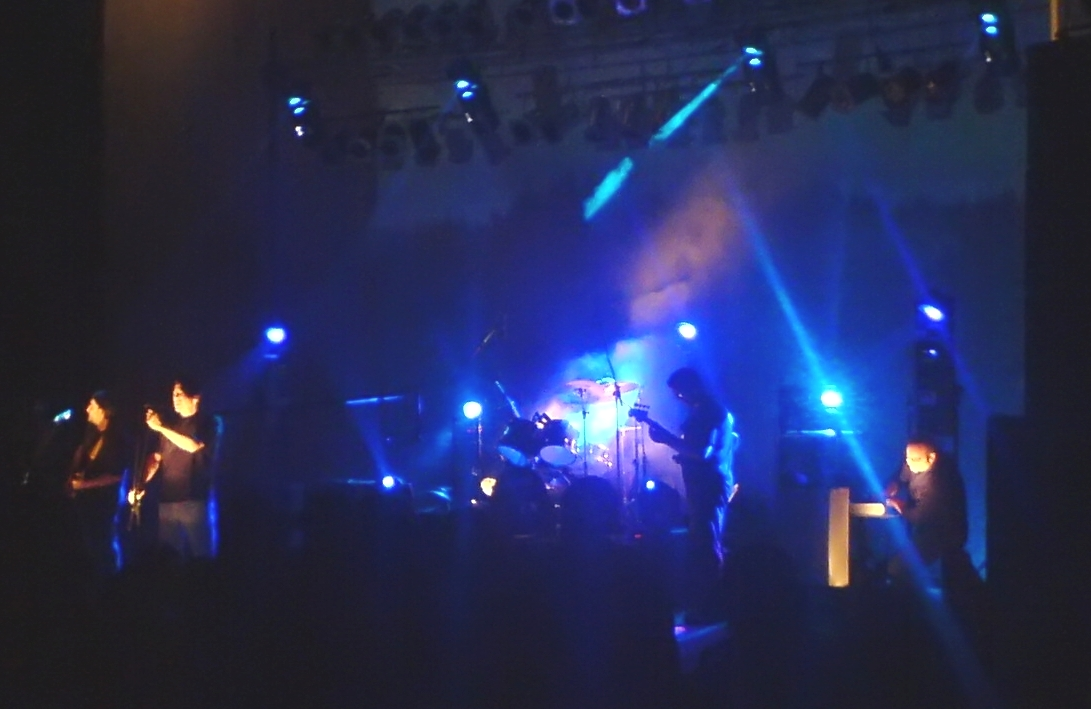
- Block Out performing live on Nisomnia music festival in 2007
- Studio albums: 4
- Live albums: 2
- Singles: 5
- Video albums: 1
- Music videos: 15

The discography of the Serbian alternative rock band Block Out comprises four studio albums, two live albums, one video album, five singles, and fifteen music videos.

The band released their debut album, Crno, belo i srebrno in 1993, after the release of the compact cassette Live KST, Akademija, also released in 1993. With the release of the band's second studio album, Godina sirotinjske zabave, the band abolished the early hard rock concept, and turned towards grunge. However, it was on the follow-up, San koji srećan sanjaš sam, that the band found their own musical style and expression, an artistically oriented alternative rock, captured live on the three volume live album Između dva zla, also found on the fourth studio album Ako imaš s kim i gde, released in 2004. In 2007, the band released the self-titled DVD featuring the live recording of the 2005 Belgrade Dom Omladine performance, and all the music videos the band had made throughout their career. At the moment, the band is preparing a new studio album.

== Studio albums ==
Year	Album details
1993	Crno, belo i srebrno: Released: 1993; Label: ITV Melomarket; Format: CS, CD
1996	Godina sirotinjske zabave: Released: 1996; Label: Metropolis; Format: CS, CD
1998	San koji srećan sanjaš sam: Released: 1998; Label: Metropolis; Format: CS, CD
2004	Ako imaš s kim i gde: Released: 2004; Label: Universal/Multimedia; Format: CS, CD

== Live albums ==
Year	Album details
1993	Live KST, Akademija: Released: 1993; Label: Take It Or Leave It; Format: CS
2001	Između dva zla: Released: 2001; Label: Metropolis; Format: CS, CD

== Singles ==
=== Various artists compilation appearances ===
Year	Single details
1993	"Neki moji drugovi": From the compilation: Academia Vol.1; Released: 1993; Label: L.V.O.; Format: CS
1994	"Kiša" / "Ja znam": From the compilation: New Rock Power '93-'94; Released: 1994; Label: ITV Melomarket; Format: CS, CD
1996	"SDSS": From the compilation: Ustani i kreni; Released: 1996; Label: Metropolis; Format: CS

=== Tribute album appearances ===
Year	Single details
2002	"Soba": From the tribute album: Kao da je bilo nekad... Posvećeno Milanu Mladenoviću; Released: 2002; Label: Circle; Format: CD
2006	"Volkovi": From the tribute album:: Pankrti 06; Released: 2006; Label: B Pop Založba; Format: CD

== Video albums ==
Year	Album details
2007	Block Out DVD: Released: 2007; Label: Universal/Multimedia; Format: DVD

== Music videos ==
Song
1993	"Neki moji drugovi"
1993	"Devojko mala"
1996	"Trenje"
1996	"Sekira"
1996	"Manastir"
1996	"Nedostupna polja"
1998	"Beltaine"
1998	"Protiv sebe"
1998	"San koji srećan sanjaš sam"
1998	"Zvezdane staze"
2002	"Soba"
2004	"Tata Brada"
2004	"Ako imaš s kim i gde"
2005	"Majdan"
2005	"Nevremena"
