= Banshee (disambiguation) =

In Irish and Scottish mythology, the banshee is a "fairy woman" whose mournful wail heralds an imminent death.

Banshee may also refer to:

== Fiction ==
- Banshee (character), a superhero in Marvel Comics
- "Banshee" (short story), a 1984 autobiographical short story by Ray Bradbury
- Silver Banshee, a DC Comics character
- Banshees, large flightless blind carnivorous birds in Marion Zimmer Bradley's Darkover series

=== Film and television ===
- Banshee (film), a 2006 TV movie by Kari Skogland
- Banshee (TV series), an American action television series that aired from 2013 to 2016
- Mountain Banshee, a flying animal in the film Avatar
- The Banshees of Inisherin, 2022 film sometimes informally called Banshees

== Music ==
- Banshee (band), a melodic power metal band from the 1980s American Midwest
- Banshee (musician), an American heavy metal musician
- The Banshee (band), an indie-new wave band from Genova
- The Banshees (band), an American garage rock band
- Banshee (album), a 2016 album by The Cave Singers
- Siouxsie and the Banshees, a British rock band
- The Banshee (composition), a musical piece by American composer Henry Cowell
- "Banshee", an instrumental track by Irish band Thin Lizzy on their 1974 album Nightlife
- "Banshee", a song by American electronic singer Santigold on her 2016 album 99¢
- "The Banshee", a song by Serbian band Orthodox Celts on their 2017 album Many Mouths Shut!
- "Banshee", the Irish entry by Anna Kearney to the Junior Eurovision Song Contest 2019

== Vehicles ==
- Banshee (dinghy), an American cat-rigged, one-design, sailing dinghy design
- HMS Banshee (1894), a Banshee class destroyer
- International Ultralite Banchee, ultralight aircraft
- McDonnell F2H Banshee, a military fighter aircraft
- Pontiac Banshee, a concept car
- QinetiQ Banshee, a series of British air target drones
- A-24 Banshee, USAAF equivalent of the SBD Dauntless dive bomber
- Yamaha Banshee 350, a high-performance all-terrain vehicle

== Other ==
- Voodoo Banshee, a video card by 3Dfx
- Banshee (video game), a 1994 Amiga shoot 'em up video game
- Banshee (collection), a 1994 fashion collection by Alexander McQueen
- Banshee (roller coaster), a steel roller coaster located at Kings Island amusement park in Mason, Ohio
