= A Moment Like the Longest Day =

Studio album by Orthodox Celts
- Released: 2002
- Recorded: November 2001 – June 2002
- Studios: Vitas Studio, Belgrade
- Genres: Irish folk; Celtic rock
- Label: Metropolis Records
- Producer: Nikola Vranjković

Orthodox Celts chronology
Green Roses (1999)	A Moment Like the Longest Day (2002)	One, Two... Five (2007)

Professional ratings
Review scores
Source	Rating
Monitor	3.5/5 stars
Popboks	6/10 stars
Rock Express	9/10 stars

A Moment Like the Longest Day is the fourth studio album by the Serbian Irish folk/Celtic rock band Orthodox Celts released in 2002.

Produced by Block Out leader Nikola Vranjković and featuring only one cover of a traditional Irish song, "Humors of Scariff", A Moment Like the Longest Day is more rock-oriented than the band's previous releases.

In 2021, the album was polled 91st on the list of 100 Best Serbian Albums Since the Breakup of SFR Yugoslavia. The list was published in the book Kako (ni)je propao rokenrol u Srbiji (How Rock 'n' Roll in Serbia (Didn't) Came to an End).

== Track listing ==
A Moment Like the Longest Day track listing
No.	Title	Lyrics	Music	Length
1.	"Moment ... Like the Longest Day"	Aleksandar Petrović; Ana Đokić	Ana Đokić	5:38
2.	"Captain Moonlight and Me"	Aleksandar Petrović	Ana Đokić	6:02
3.	"Against the Wind"	Aleksandar Petrović	Ana Đokić	3:47
4.	"The Real Me"	Aleksandar Petrović; Ana Đokić	Ana Đokić	2:35
5.	"Humors of Scariff"		Traditional	3:28
6.	"Can You Get Me Out?"	Colette Ioannidou	Ana Đokić	4:17
7.	"Sail Away"	Aleksandar Petrović	Ana Đokić	3:03
8.	"Front Row Theme"		Ana Đokić	1:51
9.	"Eimer"	Colette Ioannidou	Ana Đokić	5:33
10.	"Hidden Corner"	Aleksandar Petrović	Ana Đokić	3:36
11.	"Dead End"	Aleksandar Petrović	Ana Đokić	6:01

== Personnel ==
- Aleksandar Petrović– vocals
- Ana Đokić – violin, vocals (on track 6), backing vocals
- Dušan Živanović – drums, percussion
- Dejan Lalić – mandolin, acoustic guitar, electric guitar, bagpipes, tin whistle
- Vladan Jovkovic - acoustic guitars, backing vocals
- Dejan Grujić – bass, acoustic guitar, electric guitar, keyboards, backing vocals
- Dejan Popin – tin whistle, whistle

=== Additional personnel ===
- Nikola Vranjković – guitar (on track 1), producer
- Mladen Vasojević – cymbal (on track 2)
- Aleksandar Balać – backing vocals (on track 3)
- Bojan Bratić – accordion (on track 4)
- Jelena Popin – backing vocals (on tracks: 7, 9, 10)
- Stevan Vitas – keyboards (on tracks: 1, 2, 6, 7, 9, 11)
- Velja Mijanović – engineer, mastering

== Legacy ==
In 2021 the album was polled 91st on the list of 100 Best Serbian Albums Since the Breakup of SFR Yugoslavia. The list was published in the book Kako (ni)je propao rokenrol u Srbiji (How Rock 'n' Roll in Serbia (Didn't) Came to an End).
