= Waxies' Dargle =

Irish folk song

"The Waxies' Dargle" is a traditional Irish folk song about two Dublin "aul' wans" (older ladies/mothers) discussing how to find money to go on an excursion. It is named after an annual outing to Ringsend, near Dublin city, by Dublin cobblers (waxies). It originated as a 19th-century children's song and is now a popular pub song in Ireland.

== Origin of “The Waxies’ Dargle” ==
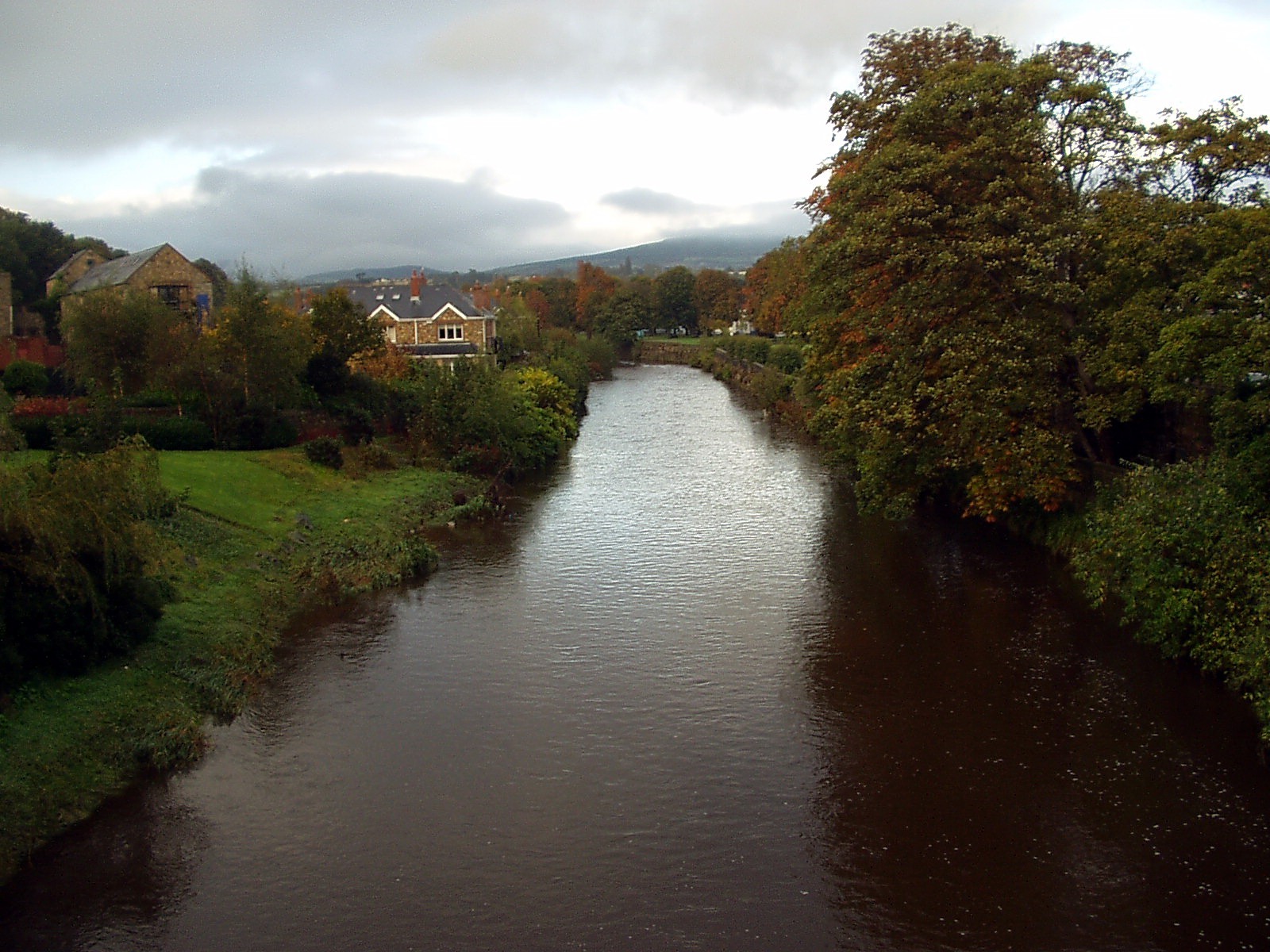
The Dargle

In the 19th century, during the Summer, the gentry of Dublin would travel out to Bray and Enniskerry with their entourages and have picnics on the banks of the River Dargle. The Dargle was a popular holiday resort, and the name in Dublin slang became synonymous with "holiday resort".

The shoemakers and repairers in Dublin were known as waxies because they used wax to waterproof and preserve the thread they used in stitching the shoes. Easter and Whitsun were their principal holidays, with Monday being the excursion for men and Tuesday for women. The original Waxies' Dargle was said to be part of Donnybrook Fair, but because of riotous behaviour, this fair closed in 1855. In any case, the waxies' excursions did not go all the way to Bray but only went as far as Irishtown, located between Ringsend and Sandymount. In imitation of the gentry, they called their outing the Waxies' Dargle. They drove out from the city to Ringsend on flat drays, ten or a dozen to each vehicle. It cost two pence per car-load and the usual cry of the driver was "Tuppence, an' up with yeh!". Those who wanted a more comfortable ride could take a jaunting car from D'Olier Street for three pennies.

Their destination was a favourite resort for Dubliners, a grass-covered triangle near the seafront at Irishtown. On Summer evenings, fiddlers, flautists, and melodeon players played dance music (sets, half-sets, and reels) until midnight. There was a roaring trade in porter, cockles, and mussels, and "treacle Billy". On Bank holidays there were boxing contests.

There is an engraved stone marking the Waxies' Dargle "picnic" site near The Merry Cobbler Pub in Irishtown.

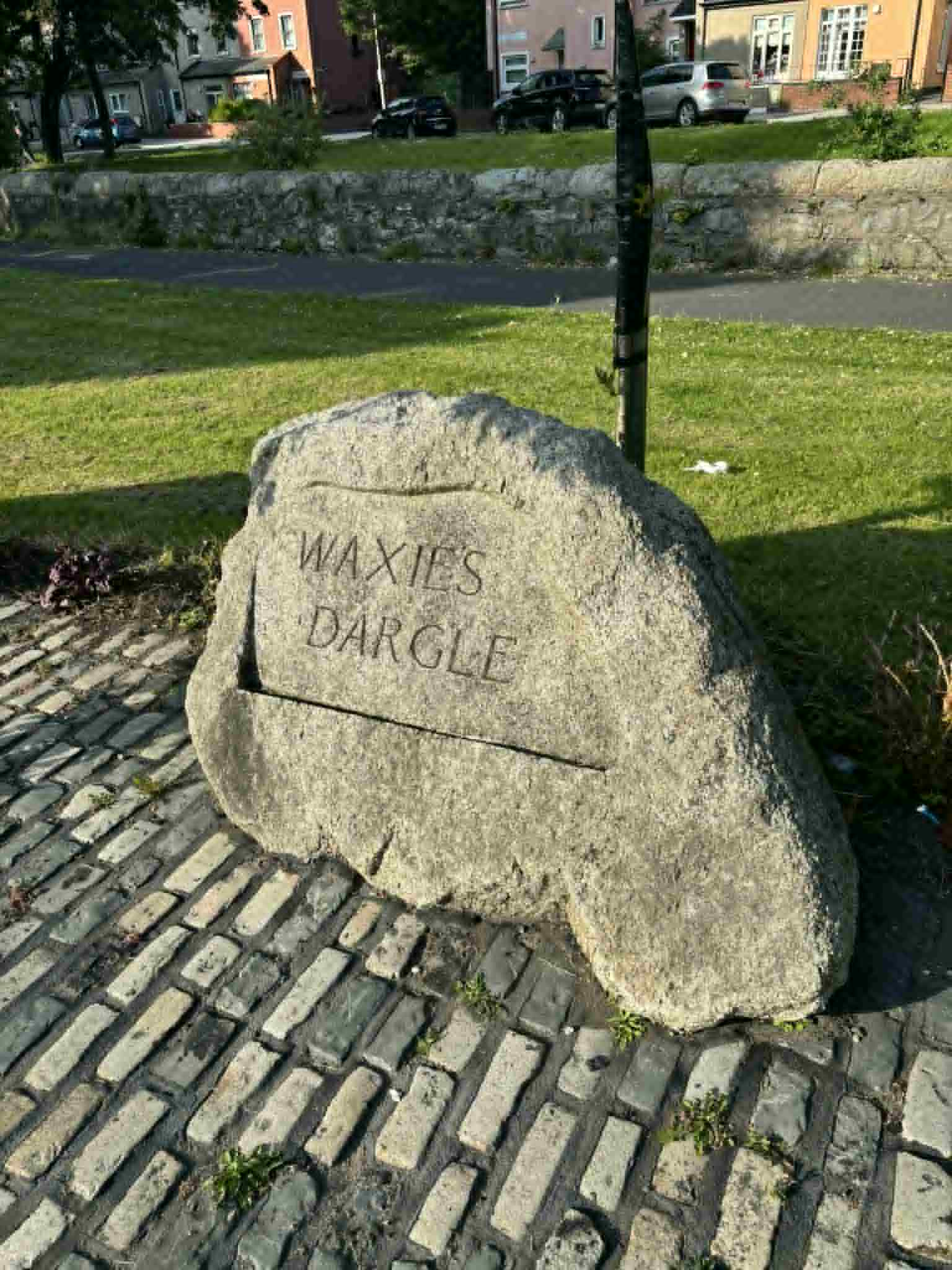
The Engraved Waxies' Dargle Stone in Irishtown

Robert Gogan describes how the "Waxies' Dargle" focuses on working-class Dublin. The places referenced are in areas frequented by the inferior. Monto was an area around Montgomery Street, a notorious red-light district near the centre of Dublin. Capel Street is on the north side of the city and was renowned for its pawnbroking shops, a few of which remain to this day.

The Waxies' Dargle is also mentioned in another Dublin folk song, "Monto (Take Her Up to Monto)" by George Desmond Hodnett.

The Waxies' Dargle is referenced in the Aeolus episode of the novel Ulysses by James Joyce. The character Myles Crawford refers to the two old ladies on top of Nelson's pillar as being "Out for the Waxies' Dargle".

== The air ==
The air to which the song is sung is that of "Brighton Camp" (a reel in G Major), which is also used for "The Girl I Left Behind" and "The Rare Old Mountain Dew". The earliest known version of the melody was printed about 1810 in Hime's Pocket Book for the German Flute or Violin (Dublin), vol. 3, p. 67, under the title The Girl I Left Behind Me (in the National Library of Ireland, Dublin).

== Recordings ==
- Dominic Behan and Ewan MacColl on The Singing Streets in 1958
- Sweeney's Men as a single released in 1968
- Mucky Duck Bush Band on their 1980 album "At Last The Mucky Duck"
- The FerryBoat Musicians on their self-titled album in 1984, re-released on CD in 2008
- The Pogues on their 1984 album Red Roses for Me
- Four to the Bar on their 1994 live album Craic on the Road
- Young Dubliners on their 2005 album Real World
- Tom Donovan on A Taste of Ireland: Pub Songs
- Orthodox Celts on the 1996 live album Muzičke Paralele
- So-Ranna on their 2006 self-titled E.P.
- Dr Strangely Strange referenced as part of "Donnybrook Fair" on their 1969 album Kip of the Serenes
- Los Stompers on their 1998 live album Mezzy on Stage
- Marc Gunn on his 2009 album Happy Songs of Death
- Joe Hurley for the 2008 film I Sell the Dead
- The Skels on their 1999 album Stoney Road
