= Green Roses =

Studio album by Orthodox Celts
- Released: 1999
- Recorded: June–November 1999
- Studio: Academia Studios, Belgrade
- Genre: Irish folk; Celtic rock
- Label: Metropolis Records
- Producer: Aleksandar Radosavljević

Orthodox Celts chronology
| The Celts Strike Again (1997) | Green Roses (1999) | A Moment Like the Longest Day (2002) |

Green Roses is the third studio album by the Serbian Irish folk/Celtic rock band Orthodox Celts released in 1999.

Green Roses features sixteen songs, half of which were covers of traditional songs, and the other half the band's original songs. The album was produced by Aleksandar Radosavljević, and as guests appeared Dragoljub Marković (keyboards), Aleksandar Eraković (keyboards) and Goran Stojković (backing vocals).

In 2021, the album was polled 57th on the list of 100 Best Serbian Albums Since the Breakup of SFR Yugoslavia. The list was published in the book Kako (ni)je propao rokenrol u Srbiji (How Rock 'n' Roll in Serbia (Didn't) Came to an End).

== Track list ==
Green Roses track listing
| No. | Title | Lyrics | Music | Length |
|---|---|---|---|---|
| 1. | "St. Patrick Was a Gentleman" | Traditional | Traditional | 02:19 |
| 2. | "Sindidun" | Aleksandar Petrović | Ana Đokić | 03:42 |
| 3. | "Green Roses" | Aleksandar Petrović | Ana Đokić | 03:15 |
| 4. | "Marie's Wedding" | Traditional | Traditional | 04:28 |
| 5. | "Rare Old Mountain Dew" | Traditional | Traditional | 03:20 |
| 6. | "Gravel Walk" | | Traditional | 03:29 |
| 7. | "Stand Up to Your Devils" | Colette Ioannidou | Ana Đokić | 03:44 |
| 8. | "Leads Me On" | Aleksandar Petrović | Ana Đokić | 04:02 |
| 9. | "Rocky Road to Dublin / Down the River" | Aleksandar Petrović | Ana Đokić | 04:24 |
| 10. | "Merry Sisters" | | Traditional | 02:10 |
| 11. | "Bean Na Shi" | Colette Ioannidou | Ana Đokić | 03:00 |
| 12. | "Me, Myself and Sky" | Aleksandar Petrović | Ana Đokić; Dejan Lalić | 03:25 |
| 13. | "Whisky You're The Devil" | Traditional | Traditional | 01:59 |
| 14. | "Far Away" | Aleksandar Petrović | Ana Đokić | 02:58 |
| 15. | "Wind That Shakes the Barley / Sailor on the Rock" | Traditional | Traditional | 02:29 |
| 16. | "The Beggarman" | Traditional | Traditional | 03:33 |

== Personnel ==
- Aleksandar Petrović – vocals
- Ana Đokić – violin, backing vocals, arrangements
- Dušan Živanović – accordion, drums, percussion, bodhrán, backing vocals
- Dejan Lalić – mandolin, guitar, bagpipes, banjo, mandolin, backing vocals
- Vladan Jovković – guitar, backing vocals
- Dejan Jevtović – bass, backing vocals
- Dejan Popin – tin whistle, whistle, backing vocals

=== Additional personnel ===
- Goran Stojković – backing vocals
- Aleksandar Eraković – keyboards
- Dragoljub Marković – keyboards
- Aleksandar Radosavljević - producer
- Velja Mijanović - mastering
- Dušan Đokić - artwork
- Anamarija Vartabedijan - design
- Nebojša Stanković - design

== Legacy ==
In 2021 the album was polled 57th on the list of 100 Best Serbian Albums Since the Breakup of SFR Yugoslavia. The list was published in the book Kako (ni)je propao rokenrol u Srbiji (How Rock 'n' Roll in Serbia (Didn't) Came to an End).
