= Stompers =

Stompers or The Stompers may refer to:

== Sports teams ==
- Oakland Stompers, a North American Soccer League team in the 1978 season
- East Bay FC Stompers, a National Premier Soccer League team
- Sonoma Stompers, an independent professional baseball team based in Sonoma, California
- Stompers RFC, a Maltese rugby club
- St. Catharines Blue Jays, a Canadian minor league baseball renamed the St. Catharines Stompers (1996-1999)

== Entertainment ==
- The Stompers (band), an American rock band
- Los Stompers, an Irish music group based in Barcelona, Spain
- Stompers (toy), a line of toy trucks and other vehicles

== See also ==
- Stomp (disambiguation)
- "The Stomper", a ring name of Archie Gouldie, a retired Canadian professional wrestler
