= Muzičke paralele =

Live album by Orthodox Celts and Pachamama
- Released: 1996
- Recorded: 15 September 1995
- Venue: Synagogue, Novi Sad
- Genre: Andean music; Irish folk; Celtic rock
- Label: Self-released
- Producer: Slobodan Misailović

Orthodox Celts chronology
Orthodox Celts (1994)	Muzičke paralele (1996)	The Celts Strike Again (1997)

Muzičke paralele (trans. Musical Parallels) is the live album released by Serbian Irish folk/Celtic rock band Orthodox Celts and Serbian Andean music band Pachamama. The album was recorded on the bands' concert in Novi Sad Synagogue, held on 15 September 1995, and self-released by the bands in 1996. The first six tracks on the album are performed by Pachamama, the following seven are performed by Orthodox Celts, and the last five are performed together by two bands.

== Track listing ==
Pachamama
No.	Title	Music	Length
1.	"Vírgenes Del Sol"	Jorge Bravo de Rueda
2.	"Tinku"	Traditional
3.	"Phuru Runas"	Ramiro de la Zerda
4.	"Cunumicita"	Gilberto Rojas
5.	"Chilli"	Traditional
6.	"El Condor Pasa"	Daniel Alomía Robles

Orthodox Celts
No.	Title	Music	Length
7.	"Mrs. McGrath"	Traditional
8.	"Star of the County Down"	Traditional
9.	"Shetland Reel"	Traditional
10.	"Marrie's Wedding"	Traditional
11.	"Waxie's Dargle / Big Strong Man"	Traditional / Traditional
12.	"Waltzing Matilda"	Traditional
13.	"Boston O'Connor / John Gassney's Fling / Doorus Mill"	Traditional / Traditional / Jackie Daly

Orthodox Celts and Pachamama
No.	Title	Music	Length
14.	"Campanitas De Punayro"	Traditional
15.	"The Strayaway Child"	Traditional
16.	"Valicha"	Miguel Ángel Hurtado Delgado
17.	"My Little Boat"	Traditional
18.	"Pandilla Puneña"	Traditional

== Personnel ==
=== Pachamama ===
- Vladimir Lazić - guitar, vocals
- Stanislav Stanojević - charango, panpipes
- Snežana Stanojević - flute, panpipes

=== Orthodox Celts ===
- Aleksandar Petrović - vocals
- Ana Đokić - violin
- Dejan Lalić - mandolin, banjo, guitar, tin whistle
- Dušan Živanović - accordion, bodhrán, tin whistle
- Vlada Jovković - guitar
- Željko Janković - percussion

=== Additional personnel ===
- Ivan Vlatković - recording
- Svetozar Štrbac - engineer
- Slobodan Misailović - producer
