= Peigín Leitir Móir =

Song
- Language: Irish
- English title: "Peggy Lettermore"
- Published: 1911
- Genre: Irish folk song
- Songwriters: Máirtín Ó Clochartaigh, Pádraic Ó Maille

"Peigín Leitir Móir" is a popular Irish folk song.

The original verses of the song were written in Irish by Máirtín Ó Clochartaigh and Pádraic Ó Maille of Leitir Caladh (a townland to the north of Leitir Mór, County Galway) around the turn of the 20th century. It was published in the review An Claidheamh Soluis in 1911. However, new verses were added at various times and places as the song gained popularity in Irish-speaking districts.

In general, the song extols the beauty of a woman called Peigín, and tells how she attracts not only the poet but men from different districts.

The song is also played as a polka, without lyrics, by traditional musicians.

== Recordings ==
- The Dubliners, In Concert (1965), A Time to Remember (2009)
- Na Casaidigh (1994)
- Orthodox Celts, The Celts Strike Again (1997)
- Tadhg Mac Dhonnagáin (2008)
- John Spillane, Irish Songs We Learned at School (2008)
- Seán Ó Riada
- Ceoltóirí Chualann
