= One, Two... Five =

Studio album by Orthodox Celts
- Released: March 17, 2007
- Genre: Irish folk; Celtic rock
- Length: 38:46
- Label: Automatik Records
- Producer: Nikola Vranjković

Orthodox Celts chronology
A Moment Like the Longest Day (2002)	One, Two... Five (2007)	Many Mouths Shut! (2017)

Professional ratings
Review scores
Source	Rating
Popboks	6/10 stars

One, Two... Five is the fifth studio album by the Serbian Irish folk/Celtic rock band Orthodox Celts released in 2007.

Unlike the band's previous releases, for which most of the band's songs were composed by violinist Ana Đokić, songs on One, Two... Five were composed mostly by Dejan Lalić. One, Two... Five was the band's last album to feature Ana Đokić. Like the band's previous album, A Moment Like the Longest Day, One, Two... Five was produced by Block Out leader Nikola Vranjković.

One, Two... Five is Orthodox Celts' only studio album to feature a cover which is not a cover of an Irish folk song. It is a cover of the Thin Lizzy song "Sarah".

== Track list ==
One, Two... Five track listing
No.	Title	Lyrics	Music	Length
1.	"The Sparrow Song"	Aleksandar Petrović	Dejan Grujić	02:58
2.	"Two Faces"	Aleksandar Petrović	Dejan Grujić	02:46
3.	"What's Goin' On"	Aleksandar Petrović; Dejan Grujić	Dejan Grujić	03:25
4.	"Sarah"	Gary Moore; Phil Lynott	Gary Moore; Phil Lynott	02:18
5.	"Can't Say Another Prayer"	Aleksandar Petrović; Nenad Lazarević	Dejan Grujić	04:42
6.	"Freedom Cry"	Dragana Ponjavić	Dejan Grujić	03:40
7.	"Pain for Sale"	Aleksandar Petrović	Dejan Grujić	04:36
8.	"Queen of the Day"	Aleksandar Petrović; Dejan Grujić	Dejan Grujić	02:38
9.	"Native Ground"	Aleksandar Petrović; Dragana Ponjavić	Dejan Grujić	02:52
10.	"Your Song"	Aleksandar Petrović	Dejan Grujić	04:21
11.	"Fields Of Athenry"	Pete St. John	Pete St. John	04:30

== Personnel ==
- Aleksandar Petrović – vocals, spoons
- Ana Đokić-Brusić – violin
- Dušan Živanović – drums
- Dejan Lalić – mandola, mandolin, backing vocals, engineer
- Vladan Jovković – acoustic guitar, backing vocals
- Dejan Grujić – guitar, bass guitar, keyboards
- Dejan Popin – whistles

=== Additional personnel ===
- Nikola Vranjković – slide guitar (on track 10), producer, arranged by
- Saša Ranđelović – slide guitar (on track 10)
- Aleksandar "Era" Eraković – backing vocals
- Jelena Popin-Stanošević – backing vocals
- Zoran Antonijević – backing vocals (on track 10)
- Marko Jovanović – engineer
- Marko Nježić – engineer

== Reissue ==
In 2023, the remastered version of the album was released on vinyl by Mascom Records.
