= Canticle of the Turning =

1990 hymn based on the Magnificat

- by Rory Cooney
- Genre: Hymn
- Written: 1990
- Text: by Rory Cooney
- Language: English
- Based on: Luke 1:46–55
- Meter: C.M. (8.6.8.6 D)
- Melody: Star of the County Down
- Published: 1990 by GIA Publications

"Canticle of the Turning", also known by its first line "My soul cries out with a joyful shout", is a Christian hymn based on the Magnificat. It was published in 1990 by Catholic composer Rory Cooney and set to the Irish folk tune Star of the County Down. The four-verse hymn portrays Mary's song as a revolutionary anthem of justice and hope in an environment of oppression. It has become a popular hymn in Catholic and Protestant churches alike, particularly for Advent and Christmas.

== Background ==
Rory Cooney (born 1952) is a self-taught Catholic choir director who has composed more than 250 songs for the Mass. He published "Canticle of the Turning" as a choral octavo through GIA Publications in 1990. The text is based on the Magnificat of Mary, inspired by theologian John Dominic Crossan's interpretation of the Magnificat as an "overture" to the Gospel. Cooney specifically sought to undermine the docile presentation of Mary in many 20th-century hymns by presenting Mary's voice with the energy of youth living under the political oppression of the Roman Empire. Cooney recorded the song on his 1990 album Safety Harbor alongside collaborators Gary Daigle and Theresa Donohoo. "Canticle of the Turning" was one of several hymns and worship songs written in the second half of the 20th century based on the Magnificat of Mary from Luke 1.

== Synopsis ==
"Canticle of the Turning" adapts the Magnificat in four verses set in common meter (8.6.8.6 D), along with a chorus. The rhyme scheme is a complex AABCCBDDEFFE. The first verse expresses Mary's joy in God's care for her and asks whether the world could be "about to turn." The second verse expresses Mary's confidence that God's work and mercies will persist and will be demonstrated to the whole world. The third verse conveys a belief that worldly hierarchies will be upended and that the poor and hungry will be uplifted and fed. The final verse expresses Mary's faith in God's mercy through conflict and war as the world waits for God's final victory. The chorus, repeated after each verse, reads:

My heart shall sing of the day you bring.
Let the fires of your justice burn.
Wipe away all tears, for the dawn draws near,
And the world is about to turn.

In addition to the Magnificat in Luke 1, scriptural references in the hymn include Acts 17:6; Psalms 27:14; 37:9, 34 and 130:5; Isaiah 25:8 and Isaiah 40:31 and the Song of Zechariah in Luke 1.

== Music ==
The musical setting of the hymn, Star of the County Down, is a pentatonic Irish variant of the popular hymn tune Kingsfold. (Kingsfold was collected by Ralph Vaughan Williams in his 1906 English Hymnal.) Star of the County Down is identical to Kingsfold but "retains a bit more wildness than the domesticated English form," writes hymnologist Carl P. Daw Jr. Like many folk tunes, the tune has a degree of elasticity to permit the addition of extra syllables or adjust pitch as needed. Guitar accompaniment is idiomatic, according to Daw. The tune's range spans one and one-third octaves in a lower register, making it accessible to a range of singers.

== Reception ==
The hymn has appeared in at numerous hymnals, including several published by GIA Publications for use by the Catholic Church, as well as in hymnals published for the Anglican Church of Canada, Christian Reformed Church in North America, Community of Christ, Evangelical Lutheran Church in America (Evangelical Lutheran Worship), Mennonite Church USA, National Association of Congregational Christian Churches, and Presbyterian Church (USA). The hymn has been recorded by feminist folk group Siskin Green. It is Cooney's only song to receive widespread adoption outside the Catholic Church. The "Canticle of the Turning" is a popular selection for the Advent and Christmas seasons.

The text of the canticle plays on the "revolutionary and apocalyptic resonances" in the Magnificat, evoking a version of Mary who is not "meek and mild" but rather a bold prophet. Barbara P. Rossing highlights the message of hope embedded in the apocalyptic text. Liturgical scholar Bridget Nichols highlights the text's focus on revolutionary upheaval leading to a just environment. According to Rebecca Konyndyk DeYoung of Calvin University, the song "aligns our aching hearts and steadies our gaze on God's promised redemption and new creation," helping singers "[w]ithin that cosmic gospel story [to] grasp both anger's value and its limits." Church musician Hilary Seraph Donaldson praises the combination of the "direct text and rowdy tune" as evoking a Celtic cèilidh, which she says can be amplified by combining piano, drum and melody instruments in accompaniment.

"Canticle of the Turning" is popular among younger audiences, including liberal Catholics and college students at places like the University of San Diego and the University of Notre Dame. It is traditionally sung at the end of the weekly "Milkshake Mass" at Notre Dame's Dillon Hall. It has been sung as a protest song.
