= Los Stompers =

- Origin: Barcelona, Catalonia, Spain
- Genres: Folk; pop; folk rock
- Years active: 1997–present
- Label: Ventilador Music
- Members: Dara Luskin; Frank McMahon; Brian O'Mahony; David Holmes; Marcos Lopez
- Past members: Alex Crichton; Colm Petit; Salva Suau; David Garcia; Juan Aguiar; Dave Varriale
- Website: www.losstompers.com/

Los Stompers are an Irish music group based in Barcelona, Spain. Formed in 1997, the group refers to itself as post-Irish. They have established themselves as a point of reference on the Catalan music scene, developing from Irish folk beginnings towards a more personalised stance expressed by what they call the Barcelona Irish Sound. The group seek to demystify Irish Traditional Music and in general all forms of folk music by drawing on a variety of styles injected with a healthy dose of irony.

== History ==
After the break-up of the Stomping Clawhammers, Dara Luskin (bass), Frank McMahon (banjo, mandolin), Alex Crichton (vocals, guitar) formed Los Stompers in 1997. Following a tour of Scandinavia, the band released its first album, Mezzy on Stage, in 1998. Recorded live in the now defunct Jazzmatazz, Barcelona and released through former Los Manolos group members label, Ventilador Music, the album was a compendium of traditional Irish pub songs such as "Follow me up to Carlow", "The Star of the County Down" and "Waxie's Dargle" as well as original material. 1999 saw the release of their debut studio album, Pub Friction, joined by Colm Petit on fiddle, and solidified their proposal of a fusion between many styles and traditions from Catalan rumba to country music. This was achieved through the production skills of former Manolos drummer Andreu Hernandez, various collaborations with experienced session musicians such as Ricky Araiza and Cece Giannotti, and the inclusion of many instruments not normally found in Irish music such as the cajón, the darbouka, trumpet and tuba. The album was received well in the Spanish press, with reviews by EFE EME and La Vanguardia.

With the inclusion of David García on drums and the replacement of Colm Petit initially by Dave Holmes and later by Juan Aguiar, 2001 saw the release of Belmondo Café. A more stylised and produced album but laced yet again with a dash of wry humour and fusion of genres including ska, ragga and pop. The album was reviewed by Spanish newspapers Avui and El País.The group followed this up with a tour of Catalunya and a new-look line-up. Dani Violant joined on diatonic accordion and Salva Suau and Dave Holmes replaced David Garcia and Juan Aguiar respectively. The band's single "Turn of the century EU" was on the playlist of the Spanish radio station M80 Radio during May 2001. In 2003 Dave Varriale replaced Salva Suau on drums. Varriale had recently finished a Tour with Paul Fuster. The year 2005 saw more personnel changes, with Violant and Varriale both leaving and Marcos López joining on drums. In 2008 the group were invited to play in the prestigious Skagen Festival in Denmark, lining up alongside folk legends such as Donovan and The Dubliners.

"Belmondo Cafe shows a sense of humour at times more unfathomable than the Dalinian extravagance displayed on its cover... an invitation to descend into the city's most dissolute dives...facetious and filthy, but hardly ever uncouth"

=== Side Projects ===
During the following years the band began to diversify into other areas of music. In 2002 Alex Crichton (guitar, vocals) and Frank McMahon (banjo, mandolin & vocals) set up Ded Grandad, a group dedicated to the recuperation of American folk music from the turn of the century. In 2006 the band released their first CD called On the Gravey Train, which featured newer additions to the group such as Dara Luskin on bass, Ricky Ariza de los Cobos on bazouki and Nigel Haywood on clarinet. The band has played in festivals such as Blue a Roses or Country Beer Blues.

2006 saw the launch, with Irish tap dancing group Celtic Caos of their Irish music and dance show An Taisteal. During the following years the two groups played in festivals in Catalonia, Andorra and France. In 2008 An Taisteal toured Aragon playing in towns such as Zuera, La Almunia and Fuentes del Ebro among others.

=== New album ===
In 2006, after nine years in the group Alex Crichton decided to call it a day. He was replaced by Brian O'Mahony, originally from Cork, Ireland as lead singer and guitarist. This was the last change in what now is the full-time line up of the group. With this injection of new blood the group began work on their fourth album. After a long gestation period, the recording finally began in November 2008, reuniting them with the producer of their previous albums, Andreu Hernandez, recording once again in the studios of Ventilador Music in Sants, Barcelona. The album, titled Animal, Vegetable, Miserable was released in November 2009.

== Discography ==
- Mezzy on Stage (Ventilador Music, 1998)
- Pub Friction (Ventilador Music, 1999)
- Belmondo Café (Ventilador Music, 2001)
- Animal, Vegetable, Miserable (Ventilador Music, 2009)
