= All For Me Grog =

- Side A of the UK single

Single by The Dubliners
- B-side: "A Pub With No Beer"
- Released: 6 July 1967
- Genre: Folk
- Length: 3:01
- Label: Major Minor
- Songwriter: traditional
- Producer: Tommy Scott

The Dubliners singles chronology
"Black Velvet Band" (1967)	"All For Me Grog" (1967)	"Maids When You're Young Never Wed An Old Man" (1967)

"All For Me Grog" (Roud 475) is a traditional folk song, also known as "Good Brown Ale and Tobacco" or "Across the Western Plains", that was originally popular with sailors and later adopted by folk music performers and pub singers. It was collected by George Gardiner in 1906 under the title "The Nobby Hat". James Madison Carpenter collected a version in c 1928 as "All for the Grog". In 1961 A. L. Lloyd and Alf Edwards recorded the song on an E.P. by Topic Records.

It tells the tale of a man who sells all his possessions, and even his wife, to pay for drink and tobacco. Although the song is effectively about a man's ruin through drink, it is upbeat and celebratory rather than regretful, with the intention to go back to the sea to find a new fortune. It is usually performed as a raucous chorus song. Grog originally referred to a daily ration of rum that used to be given in diluted form to sailors in the Royal Navy. It later came to refer to all types of drink.

There is an Australian version of the song called Across the Western Plains.

The song was recorded as a single by The Dubliners. It had previously been recorded by The Watersons on their eponymous 1966 album and, more recently, by The Mary Wallopers on their eponymous 2022 album.

Serbian band Orthodox Celts recorded a version of the song for their 1994 self-titled début album.

The American quintet Bounding Main released their version of the song on their 2006 album Lost at Sea.
