= Orthodox Celts (album) =

Studio album by Orthodox Celts
- Released: 1994
- Recorded: March–April 1994
- Studio: Studio Adam, Belgrade
- Genre: Irish folk; Celtic rock
- Label: Take It or Leave It Records
- Producer: Orthodox Celts; Predrag Guculj

Orthodox Celts chronology
Orthodox Celts (1994)	Muzičke paralele (1996)

Professional ratings
Review scores
Source	Rating
Ritam	4/5 stars

Orthodox Celts is the debut album by Serbian Irish folk/Celtic rock band Orthodox Celts released in 1994. It is the only Orthodox Celts album which features only covers of Irish traditional songs.

== Track listing ==
All the songs are covers of Irish traditional songs.

Orthodox Celts track listing
No.	Title	Length
1.	"Bog Down the Valleye"	1:55
2.	"Weila Waila"	2:47
3.	"Irish Rover"	3:00
4.	"Sonnys"	2:40
5.	"All for Me Grog"	2:39
6.	"Poor Old Dicey Riley"	2:40
7.	"Nancy Whiskey"	2:43
8.	"Couragie / Fox Hunters"	3:51
9.	"Gentleman Soldier"	2:04
10.	"Wild Rover"	2:51
11.	"The Four Poster Bed / Colonel Rodney"	2:02
12.	"A Grand Old Team"	2:06

== Personnel ==
- Aleksandar Petrović – vocals
- Dejan Lalić – banjo, guitar, vocals
- Dušan Živanović – accordion, drums, percussion, vocals
- Ana Đokić – violin
- Predrag Guculj – bass, engineer, producer

=== Additional personnel ===
- Viktorija Jevtić – vocals
- Sava Đustibek – guitar
- Lusila Gluščević – flute
- Ljubomir Kunj - design
