= Lost Souls (Loreena McKennitt album) =

Studio album by Loreena McKennitt
- Released: May 11, 2018
- Recorded: May–October 2017
- Genres: Folk, World, Celtic
- Length: 47:58
- Label: Quinlan Road
- Producer: Loreena McKennitt

Loreena McKennitt chronology
The Wind That Shakes the Barley (2010)	Lost Souls (2018)	The Road Back Home (2024)

Singles from Lost Souls
- 1. "Breaking of the Sword" Released: 3 November 2017; 2. "A Hundred Wishes" Released: 9 March 2018; 3. "Spanish Guitars And Night Plazas" Released: 6 April 2018; 4. "Sun, Moon & Stars" Released: 27 April 2018

Professional ratings
Review scores
Source	Rating
Allmusic	4/5 stars

Lost Souls is the tenth studio album by Canadian singer-songwriter Loreena McKennitt, released on May 11, 2018. The track "The Ballad of the Fox Hunter" is an adaptation of the poem by W. B. Yeats, and "La Belle Dame Sans Merci" is an adaptation of the poem by John Keats.

== Track listing ==
No.	Title	Length
1.	"Spanish Guitars and Night Plazas"	6:41
2.	"A Hundred Wishes"	4:34
3.	"Ages Past, Ages Hence"	5:27
4.	"The Ballad of the Fox Hunter"	5:48
5.	"Manx Ayre" (Instrumental)	4:03
6.	"La Belle Dame sans merci"	6:09
7.	"Sun, Moon and Stars" (Instrumental)	4:34
8.	"Breaking of the Sword"	5:30
9.	"Lost Souls"	5:09
Total length:		47:58

== Personnel ==
- Ana Alcaide - Nyckelharpa
- Tal Bergman - Drums, Percussion
- Robert Brian - Drums, Percussion
- Stuart Bruce - Engineer, Mixing Engineer
- Daniel Casares - Flamenco Guitar, Handclapping
- Panos Dimitrakopoulos - Kanonaki
- Nigel Eaton - Hurdy-gurdy
- Graham Hargrove - Antique Cymbal, Drums (Bass), Drums (Snare)
- Ian Harper - Highland Bagpipe
- Brian Hughes - Bouzouki, Guitar, Guitar (Electric), Synthesizer
- Caroline Lavelle - Cello, Concertina
- Rick Lazar - Percussion
- Bob Ludwig - Mastering Engineer
- Hugh Marsh - Violin
- Loreena McKennitt - Accordion, Harp, Keyboards, Piano, Vocals
- Dudley Phillips - Acoustic Bass, Electric Bass
- Hossam Ramzy - Percussion
- Miguel Ortiz Ruvira - Handclapping, Percussion
- Yossi Shakked - Engineer
- Sokratis Sinopoulos - Lyra
- Michael White - Trumpet
- Jeff Wolpert - Engineer, Mixing Engineer
- Haig Yazdjian - Oud

== Charts ==
Chart (2018)	Peak position
Austrian Albums (Ö3 Austria)	13
Belgian Albums (Ultratop Flanders)	32
Belgian Albums (Ultratop Wallonia)	80
Canadian Albums (Billboard)	14
Dutch Albums (Album Top 100)	43
French Albums (SNEP)	57
German Albums (Offizielle Top 100)	5
Italian Albums (FIMI)	40
Scottish Albums (Official Charts)	59
Spanish Albums (PROMUSICAE)	15
Swiss Albums (Schweizer Hitparade)	11
UK Albums Sales (OCC)	48
US Billboard 200	164
