= The Celts Strike Again =

Studio album by Orthodox Celts
- Released: 1997
- Genre: Irish folk; Celtic rock
- Length: 55:55
- Label: ITMM
- Producer: Aleksandar Radosavljević

Orthodox Celts chronology
Muzičke paralele (1996)	The Celts Strike Again (1997)	Green Roses (1999)

The Celts Strike Again is the second studio album by the Serbian Irish folk/Celtic rock band Orthodox Celts released in 1997.

The Celts Strike Again was the band's first album to feature their own songs – besides covers of traditional Irish songs, the album features two songs written by the members of the band, "Drinking Song" and "Blue".

The album featured numerous guest musicians: actress Ana Sofrenović on vocals (on the song "Loch Lomond"), Vampiri member Aleksandar Eraković on backing vocals, Stočari member Branko Vitas on banjo, member of the band Pachamama (the band Orthodox Celts recorded the live album Muzičke paralele with) Milan Mihaljčić on khene and thin whistle, and Renesansa member Žorž Grujić on zurla and Serbian bagpipes.

In the cover of the traditional Irish song "I'll Tell Me Ma" the band replaced the line "She's the belle of Belfast City" with "She's the belle of Belgrade City", in reference to their hometown.

== Track list ==
All songs are covers of traditional songs, except where noted.

The Celts Strike Again track listing
No.	Title	Lyrics	Music	Length
1.	"Drinking Song"	Aleksandar Petrović	Ana Đokić; Dejan Lalić	2:50
2.	"Star of the County Down"			2:25
3.	"The Wearing of the Green"			2:44
4.	"Blue"	Aleksandar Petrović	Ana Đokić; Dejan Lalić	5:02
5.	"I'll Tell Me Ma"			2:41
6.	"Maidrin Rua"			2:29
7.	"Foggy Dew"			4:23
8.	"The Celts Strike Again"			2:51
9.	"Peggy Lettermore / Jar of Porter"			2:24
10.	"Spanish Lady (Bodhran Version)"			3:39
11.	"Finnegan's Wake"			3:32
12.	"Loch Lomond"			3:30
13.	"Mick Maguire"			2:21
14.	"Salonika"			3:35
15.	"Spanish Lady"			3:39
16.	"Medley"			7:59

== Personnel ==
- Aleksandar Petrović - vocals
- Dejan Lalić - guitar, banjo, mandolin, tin whistle, backing vocals
- Vladan Jovković - guitar, backing vocals
- Ana Đokić - violin
- Dejan Jevtović - bass
- Dušan Živanović - drums, bodhrán, percussion, accordion, backing vocals

=== Additional personnel ===
- Ana Sofrenović - vocals (on "Loch Lomond")
- Aleksandar Eraković - backing vocals
- Milan Mihaljčić
- Branko Vitas - banjo
- Žorž Grujić - zurla, gajde
- Aleksandar Radosavljević - producer, engineer
- Gojko Stojisavljević - engineer
- Ivan Brusić - engineer
- Aleksandar Mikić - design
