= Rocky Road to Dublin =

19th century Irish song

- Folk song
- Catalogue: Roud Folk Song Index 3012
- Genre: Irish traditional music
- Style: Slip jig
- Commissioned by: Harry Clifton (lyrics)
- Text: by D. K. Gavan
- Language: English
- Time: 9/8

Premiere
- Date: 1859 or earlier (with lyrics)
- Performers: Harry Clifton

The Rocky Road To Dublin
The song performed by Christoph Nolte.

"Rocky Road to Dublin" is a 19th-century Irish song written by Irish poet D. K. Gavan about a man's experiences as he travels to Liverpool, England, from his home in Tuam, Ireland. Originally popularized by Harry Clifton, it has since been performed extensively and become a standard of Irish folk music. The song is also often performed instrumentally.

== Origin ==
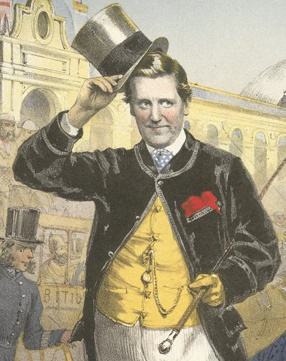
Harry Clifton in an 1863 illustration

Sheet music for "The Rocky Road to Dublin" without lyrics was published as early as 1841 in The Dublin Magazine, by which point it was already reportedly well known in Ireland. It was described in the accompanying article as being thought to be a modern dance and the title was reportedly based on a particular road in Clonmel. No lyrics were given, but the song was reportedly popular for nurses to "sing" to children, especially in Munster. The tune may derive from another folk song, "Cam Ye o'er frae France."

The words were written by D. K. Gavan, "The Galway Poet", for the English music hall performer Harry Clifton (1832–1872), who popularized the song.

== Synopsis ==
The song describes the adventures, troubles, and travails the protagonist encounters on his travels. At the beginning of the song, the protagonist says he is "off to reap the corn", meaning to seek his fortune. ("Corn" can refer to any cereal grain, such as wheat or barley, and metaphorically refers to wealth, which makes "off to reap the corn" akin to colloquialisms like "getting bread" or "stacking paper"). He begins his journey by bidding farewell to his family and friends and preparing supplies. He leaves his hometown of Tuam, County Galway, on foot, and heads east, resting in Mullingar, County Westmeath, where he charms the local women with his "curious style" and swagger. He next arrives in the capital, Dublin, and decides to tour the city, but is robbed of his meagre possessions. He attempts to find the thief ("Enquiring for the rogue"), but is mocked because of his accent ("Connaught brogue"). He hops a ship in the harbour headed for England, and is placed in the hold with the pigs, where he experiences severe sea sickness off the coast of Holyhead, Wales. He arrives in the English city of Liverpool, where he is mocked by the locals because of his nationality. Losing his temper, he engages them in a fight using his blackthorn shillelagh, but is outnumbered until a group of Irishmen from Galway come to his rescue ("join in the affray"), the first people who have helped him on his trip.

== Music ==
The tune uses Dorian mode. It has a typical Irish rhythm, classified as a hop jig in 9/8 time. An extra beat or two between chorus and verse is often added. (There are very few points where a singer can take a breath.) Sometimes the final line in the verses is sung with seven strong musical beats (9/8 + 12/8)—

And frighten all the dogs on the rocky road to Dublin. (every strong musical beat is in bold)

—rather than with six strong musical beats (9/8 + 9/8):

And frighten all the dogs on the rocky road to Dublin.

== Lyrics ==
Version reported by Manus O'Connor in 1901.

Hunt the hare and turn her down the rocky road And all the way to Dublin, whack-fol-la-de-da

In the merry month of June, when first from home I started,
And left the girls alone, sad and broken-hearted.
Shook hands with father dear, kissed my darling mother,
Drank a pint of beer, my tears and grief to smother;
Then off to reap the corn, and leave where I was born.
I cut a stout black-thorn to banish ghost or goblin;
With a pair of bran new brogues, I rattled o'er the bogs —
Sure I frightened all the dogs on the rocky road to Dublin.

(Chorus)
For it is the rocky road, here's the road to Dublin;
Here's the rocky road, now fire away to Dublin !

The steam-coach was at hand, the driver said he'd cheap ones.
But sure the luggage van was too much for my ha'pence.
For England I was bound, it would never do to balk it.
For every step of the road, bedad I says I, I'll walk it.
I did not sigh or moan until I saw Athlone.
A pain in my shin bone, it set my heart a-bubbling;
And fearing the big cannon, looking o'er the Shannon,
I very quickly ran on the rocky road to Dublin.

In Mullingar, that night, I rested limbs so weary.
Started by daylight, with spirits light and airy;
Took a drop of the pure, to keep my spirits from sinking,
That's always an Irishman's cure, whenever he's troubled with thinking.
To see the lassies smile, laughing all the while
At my comical style, set my heart a-bubbling.
They axed if I was hired, the wages I required.
Until I was almost tired of the rocky road to Dublin.

In Dublin next arrived, I thought it was a pity
To be so soon deprived of a view of that fine city;
'Twas then I took a stroll, all among the quality,
My bundle then was stole in a neat locality,
Something crossed my mind, thinks I, I'll look behind.
No bundle could I find upon my stick a-wobbling.
Inquiring for the rogue, they said my Connaught brogue.
It wasn't much in vogue on the rocky road to Dublin.

A coachman raised his hand as if myself was wanting,
I went up to a stand, full of cars for jaunting;
"Step up, my boy!" says he; "Ah, that I will with pleasure,"
"And to the Strawberry Beds, I'll drive you at your leisure."
"A strawberry bed?" says I, "faith, that would be too high!"
"On one of straw I'll lie, and the berries won't be troubling";
He drove me out as far, upon an outside car.
Faith! such jolting never wor on the rocky road to Dublin.

I soon got out of that, my spirits never failing,
I landed on the quay, just as the ship was sailing.
The captain at me roared, swore that no room had he.
But when I leaped on board, they a cabin found for Paddy.
Down among the pigs I played such rummy rigs,
Danced some hearty jigs, with water round me bubbling.
But when off Holyhead, I wished that I was dead,
Or safely put in bed, on the rocky road to Dublin.

The boys in Liverpool, when on the dock I landed.
Called myself a fool, I could no longer stand it;
My blood began to boil, my temper I was losing.
And poor old Erin's Isle, they all began abusing.
"Hurrah! my boys," says I, my shillelagh I let fly.
Some Galway boys were by, they saw I was a hobbling;
Then with a loud "hurrah!" they joined me in the fray.
Faugh-a-ballagh! Clear the way! for the rocky road to Dublin!

The lyrics vary depending on the singer. For instance, June in the first line is often, but not always, replaced by its Irish counterpart Meitheamh, mistaken by some for the English May. Most 20th-century interpretations omit the second and antepenultimate verse and replace the original chorus with the following:

One two three four five,
Hunt the hare and turn her down the rocky road
And all the way to Dublin, whack-fol-la-de-da !

== Adaptations ==
The song is partially recited several times by Mr Deasy in James Joyce's novel Ulysses.

The song serves as the first movement of Peter Graham's composition Gaelforce, which exists in versions for brass band (2000, commissioned by Foden's Band) and concert band (2001). The main theme and chorus are repeated four times, rather than five as in most modern vocal performances.

The song was adapted by songwriter Kiernan Anderson in his song "Rocky Road to Edmonton", which tells of a modern-day journey from Prince Edward Island to Alberta seeking employment in the Canadian oil sands.

The song appears on the soundtrack to Ryan Coogler's 2025 horror film Sinners, performed by Irish musicians Brian Dunphy and Darren Holden and Irish-English actor Jack O'Connell.

== Recordings ==
- The Clancy Brothers with Tommy Makem in 1964
- The Dubliners in 1964
- Luke Kelly in 1973 (this version is featured in the 2009 film Sherlock Holmes)
- Ryan's Fancy in 1973
- Paddy Reilly in 1985
- The Pogues in 1988
- Bert Jansch in 1990
- Fiddler's Green in 1992
- The Irish Descendants in 1993
- Young Dubliners in 1994
- The Chieftains featuring with The Rolling Stones on The Long Black Veil in 1995
- The Rolling Stones in 1995
- Clandestine in 1996
- The Permanent Cure in 1996
- Gaelic Storm in 1998
- Orthodox Celts on Green Roses in 1999
- Belfast Food on album Zašto zato in 2000
- Christy Moore in 2000
- Dropkick Murphys in 2001 and 2002
- Brobdingnagian Bards in 2002
- Cruachan in 2002
- Mad Dog Mcrea in 2002
- Blaggards in 2005
- Bad Haggis in 2005
- Barleyjuice in 2006
- Damien Dempsey in 2008
- The High Kings in 2008 and 2017
- The Tossers in 2008
- Johnny Logan in 2008, Irishman in America
- Culann's Hounds in 2008
- Leatherat in 2010
- Celtic Thunder in 2013
- Damien Leith in 2015, from the album Songs From Ireland
- The Kings of Connaught in 2016
- Fiachna Ó Braonáin in 2016, from the play The Bloody Irish
- Lankum in 2019
- Colm R. McGuinness, 2022
- The Longest Johns in 2023
- Sam Shackleton, aka "Sorley The Bard", in 2025
- Jack O'Connell in the 2025 film Sinners
- Glen Hansard in 2026
