= Sarah (Thin Lizzy song) =

- Single cover featuring Phil Lynott

Single by Thin Lizzy

from the album Black Rose: A Rock Legend
- B-side: "Got to Give It Up"
- Released: 5 October 1979
- Genre: Pop
- Length: 3:32
- Label: Vertigo
- Songwriters: Phil Lynott; Gary Moore
- Producers: Tony Visconti; Thin Lizzy

Thin Lizzy singles chronology
"Got to Give It Up" (1979)	"Sarah" (1979)	"A Merry Jingle" (1979)

Alternative cover
- Label of an early pressing of Black Rose featuring the title "My Sarah"

"Sarah" (Sometimes titled "My Sarah) is a pop song released in 1979 by Irish rock group Thin Lizzy, included on their album, Black Rose: A Rock Legend. The song was written by the band's frontman Phil Lynott and guitarist Gary Moore about Lynott's newborn daughter. The song was also issued as a single, and appeared on several compilation albums including Wild One: The Very Best of Thin Lizzy. The song was never performed live by Thin Lizzy, but it was adopted as a live favourite by Lynott's post-Thin Lizzy project, Grand Slam, and featured on Live in Sweden 1983, a recording of Lynott's solo band.

This song is not connected to another Thin Lizzy song entitled "Sarah", written for Lynott's grandmother, from their second album, Shades of a Blue Orphanage.

On early US pressings of Black Rose, the song was incorrectly titled "My Sarah" (pictured). It is also titled this on some streaming releases.

== Recording ==
"Sarah" was recorded at Morgan Studios in Willesden, and Moore completed all the guitar work, with American Mark Nauseef playing drums. Neither of the other members of Thin Lizzy (guitarist Scott Gorham and drummer Brian Downey) played on the song, implying that "Sarah" was originally intended for a Phil Lynott solo album. Another American musician, Huey Lewis, was featured playing distinctive harmonica parts – Lewis had been a member of Clover, a band that had supported Thin Lizzy on previous tours. Moore confirmed that the song was mostly composed on an acoustic guitar, mostly by him, and that a drum machine was used. "It wasn't even intended to be for Thin Lizzy... I thought it might end up on Phil's solo record," he added, and suggested that the song only appeared on Black Rose because Lynott was one track short for the album. He also praised Tony Visconti's production and the layering of guitars on the solo. Regarding the melody, he said he could not remember where he got the idea from: "I probably nicked it from Jan Hammer or someone."

== Artwork and video ==
Three different covers for the single were produced, each featuring different members of the group, one each for Lynott (pictured), Gorham and Downey, even though neither Gorham nor Downey played on the song. Moore had already left the group when the single was released, quitting during an American tour in July 1979.

The accompanying video for the song was filmed in early October at Hewitt Studios, and directed by David Mallet. It featured Lynott singing the song to a succession of girls, before Gorham appeared on the stage towards the end and mimed the lyrics until the song ended.

== Charts ==
The single reached no. 24 in the UK Singles Chart, and no. 26 in Ireland.

The song was performed on the British BBC TV chart programme Top of the Pops in November 1979, after Moore had left the band. Downey was also absent, and was replaced for this performance by Clive Edwards, then drummer with Wild Horses. The full line-up was Lynott, Gorham, Edwards and new guitarist Dave Flett, meaning that only Lynott was present of the musicians who had recorded the song.

== Personnel ==
- Phil Lynott – bass guitar, lead vocals
- Gary Moore – lead and rhythm guitar, backing vocals
- Mark Nauseef – drums (A-side only)
- Huey Lewis – harmonica (A-side only)
- Brian Downey – drums (B-side only)
- Scott Gorham – lead guitar (B-side only)

== Charts ==
Chart (1979–1980)	Peak position
Ireland (IRMA)	26
UK Singles (OCC)	24

== Cover versions ==
The song was covered by Serbian Irish folk/Celtic rock band Orthodox Celts on their 2007 album One, Two... Five.
