= Belfast Food =

Croatian music band

- Origin: Rijeka, Croatia
- Genres: Irish folk, Irish rock
- Years active: 1996–present
- Labels: Dallas Records
- Members: Erik Malnar; Alen Širola; Marko Anić; Marko Jurić; Sebastian Mavrić
- Website: belfastfood.com

Belfast Food is a music band from Rijeka, Croatia, performing Irish folk and rock music under their current name since 1996.

They have been featured on the national charts at least once.

Belfast Food had several original hit singles, such as "Van iz grada", "Trivijalna stvar", "Lagano lagano". They have also created covers of popular Irish songs, such as "Rocky Road to Dublin" ,"Dirty Old Town" ("Šporki stari grad") or the Australian "Waltzing Matilda" ("Mate i Matilda").

== Discography ==
=== Studio albums ===
- Live in Rijeka (Kondorcomm, 1997)
- Zašto zato (Kondorcomm, 2000)
- Melodije Irske i Kvarnera (Dallas Records, 2002)
- Zeleni album (Dallas Records, 2006)
- Live in Tvornica (Audio CD and Video DVD, Dallas Records, 2008)

=== Singles ===
Title	Year	Peak chart positions	Album
Title	Year	CRO	Album
"Volim kako se smiješ" (with Nikolina Tomljanović)	2021	3	Non-album single
"—" denotes releases that did not chart or were not released in that territory.
