= The Wind That Shakes the Barley (album) =

Studio album by Loreena McKennitt
- Released: November 12, 2010
- Recorded: July 2010
- Genre: Folk, world, Celtic
- Length: 45:11
- Label: Quinlan Road
- Producer: Loreena McKennitt

Loreena McKennitt chronology
A Mediterranean Odyssey (2009)	The Wind That Shakes the Barley (2010)	Lost Souls (2018)

The Wind That Shakes the Barley is the ninth studio album by the Canadian singer, songwriter, accordionist, harpist, and pianist Loreena McKennitt, released on November 12, 2010.

Professional ratings
Review scores
Source	Rating
Allmusic	4/5 stars

== Track listing ==
1. "As I Roved Out" (traditional) – 4:59
2. "On a Bright May Morning" (traditional) – 5:08
3. "Brian Boru's March" (traditional) – 3:51
4. "Down by the Sally Gardens" (traditional, lyrics by W. B. Yeats) – 5:39
5. "The Star of the County Down" (traditional) – 3:34
6. "The Wind That Shakes the Barley" (traditional, lyrics by Robert Dwyer Joyce) – 6:01
7. "The Death of Queen Jane" (traditional) – 6:04
8. "The Emigration Tunes" (McKennitt) – 4:42
9. "The Parting Glass" (traditional) – 5:13

== Personnel ==
- Loreena McKennitt – vocals (1, 2, 4, 5, 6, 7, 9), keyboards (1, 5, 6, 8), accordion (1, 7, 8) and harp (2, 3, 4, 7)
- Brian Hughes – Irish bouzouki (1, 3, 5, 7), drone (3), and electric (2, 4, 6, 8) & acoustic guitar (1, 8)
- Hugh Marsh – violin (1– 9)
- Caroline Lavelle – cello (1– 8)
- Ben Grossman – hurdy-gurdy drone (6), bodhrán (1, 6), frame drum (3), taber (3), triangle (1), bells (3, 5), and shaker (5)
- Ian Harper – uilleann pipes (1, 4, 5, 8) and whistle (3, 5, 6, 8)
- Tony McManus – acoustic guitar (2, 4, 7, 9)
- Jeff Bird – mandola (1, 5), mandolin (3, 6, 8) and acoustic bass (1, 8)
- Pat Simmonds – acoustic guitar (1, 5, 6, 8), button accordion (3, 5)
- Andrew Collins – mandolin (2, 7), mandocello (7)
- Brian Taheny – mandolin (4)
- Chris Gartner – bass (4)
- Andrew Downing – acoustic bass (5)
- Jason Fowler – acoustic guitar (5)
- Jeff Wolpert – recording and mixing

== Chart positions ==
Chart (2010–11)	Peak position
Austrian Albums (Ö3 Austria)	30
Belgian Albums (Ultratop Flanders)	77
Belgian Albums (Ultratop Wallonia)	78
Canadian Albums (Billboard)	13
French Albums (SNEP)	77
German Albums (Offizielle Top 100)	28
Mexican Albums (Top 100 Mexico)	69
Spanish Albums (Promusicae)	32
Swiss Albums (Schweizer Hitparade)	43
US World Albums (Billboard)	141
