= A Mediterranean Odyssey =

Compilation album by Loreena McKennitt
- Released: October 20, 2009
- Recorded: June 2009
- Genre: Folk; world music
- Length: 56:14
- Label: Quinlan Road
- Producer: Loreena McKennitt

Loreena McKennitt chronology
A Midwinter Night's Dream (2008)	A Mediterranean Odyssey (2009)	The Wind That Shakes the Barley (2010)

A Mediterranean Odyssey is a two-disc collection of the music of Canadian singer, composer and multi-instrumentalist Loreena McKennitt. The disc titled From Istanbul to Athens features a selection of previously unreleased live recordings from her 2009 Mediterranean Tour, while the disc titled The Olive and the Cedar contains previously released studio recordings selected by Loreena to complement the project's Mediterranean theme.

== Track listing ==
Disc one: The Olive and the Cedar
No.	Title	Length
1.	"The Mystic's Dream"	7:43
2.	"Tango to Evora"	4:10
3.	"The Gates of Istanbul"	4:03
4.	"Penelope's Song"	3:55
5.	"Marco Polo"	3:59
6.	"Marrakesh Night Market"	4:09
7.	"Santiago"	4:19
8.	"Caravanserai"	3:53
9.	"The Dark Night of the Soul"	4:03
10.	"Sacred Shabbat"	4:00
11.	"The Mummers' Dance"	3:33

Disc two: From Istanbul to Athens
No.	Title	Length
1.	"The Gates of Istanbul"	8:30
2.	"The Dark Night of the Soul"	6:49
3.	"Marco Polo"	4:36
4.	"Penelope's Song"	3:31
5.	"Sacred Shabbat"	3:13
6.	"Caravanseri"	5:53
7.	"Santiago"	6:08
8.	"Beneath a Phrygian Sky"	7:06
9.	"Tango to Evora"	5:01
10.	"Full Circle"	5:25

== Personnel ==
- Loreena McKennitt - Vocals, Harp, Accordion, Keyboards, Piano
- Clive Deamer - Drums, Percussion
- Simon Edwards - Bass
- Ben Grossman - Hurdy Gurdy, Percussion, Triangle
- Brian Hughes - Oud, Electric Guitars, Guitar Synthesizer, Nylon String Guitar, Celtic Bouzouki
- Caroline Lavelle - Cello
- Hugh Marsh - Violin
- Stratis Psaradellis - Greek Lute, Greek Lyra, Classical Classical Kemenche
- Panos Dimitrakpolous - Kanoun
- Haig Yazidjian - Oud
- Jeff Wolpert - Recording and mixing
- Bob Ludwig - Mastering
