= The Road Back Home (Loreena McKennitt album) =

Live album by Loreena McKennitt
- Released: March 8, 2024
- Recorded: August 2023
- Length: 42:39
- Label: Quinlan Road
- Producer: Loreena McKennitt

Loreena McKennitt chronology
Lost Souls (2018)	The Road Back Home (2024)

The Road Back Home is a live album by Canadian singer Loreena McKennitt. It was released on March 8, 2024, through Quinlan Road.

== Background and recording ==
The Road Back Home was recorded live in summer 2023 during four festival performances in Ontario, Canada. It sees the singer returning to her Celtic roots. During the performances, McKennitt recalled the feeling when she first "fell in love with Celtic music" in the 1970s and decided to capture these moments, not knowing whether she "would be back this way again". The recordings were joined by local musicians, whom McKennitt had previously worked with for her Under a Winter's Moon (2022) sessions. The album is set to serve as a "homage to simpler times", trying to catch feelings of comfort and homecoming.

== Track listing ==
The Road Back Home track listing
No.	Title	Length
1.	"Searching for Lambs" (recorded in Goderich, Ontario)	3:32
2.	"Mary and the Soldier" (recorded in Goderich, Ontario)	4:05
3.	"On a Bright May Morning" (recorded in Owen Sound, Ontario)	4:37
4.	"As I Roved Out" (recorded in Owen Sound, Ontario)	4:55
5.	"Custom Gap" (medley; recorded in Owen Sound, Ontario)	3:59
6.	"Bonny Portmore" (recorded in Goderich, Ontario)	3:42
7.	"Greystones" (recorded in Owen Sound, Ontario)	3:31
8.	"The Star of the County Down" (recorded in Goderich, Ontario)	3:42
9.	"Salvation Contradiction" (recorded in Owen Sound, Ontario)	4:23
10.	"Sí Bheag, Sí Mhór / Wild Mountain Thyme" (medley; recorded in Owen Sound, Ontario)	6:13
Total length:		42:39

== Personnel ==
Musicians

- Loreena McKennitt – vocals (tracks 1–4, 6, 8, 10), accordion (tracks 1, 4, 5, 8), harp (2, 3, 6, 7, 9, 10)
- Caroline Lavelle – cello (all tracks), vocals (track 1)
- Miriam Fischer – percussion (tracks 1, 3, 5, 6), accordion (2, 3, 7, 8, 9), piano (4, 5, 9), background vocals (8, 10)
- Romano DiNillo – bodhrán (tracks 2, 4, 5, 7–10)
- Pete Watson – guitar (tracks 2–10), background vocals (8, 10)
- Errol Fischer – violin (tracks 2, 4, 5, 7, 9, 10), mandolin (3), drums (4, 5, 8), banjo (4, 8, 9)
- Cait Watson – whistle (tracks 2–10), background vocals (8, 10)
- James Keelaghan – vocals (track 10)

Technical

- Loreena McKennitt – production (all tracks), arrangement (tracks 1–4, 6, 8, 10)
- Mark McCauley – production assistance
- Jeff Wolpert – mastering, mixing, engineering
- The Bookends – arrangement (tracks 5, 7, 9)

== Charts ==
Chart performance for The Road Back Home
Chart (2024)	Peak position
Austrian Albums (Ö3 Austria)	33
German Albums (Offizielle Top 100)	9
Scottish Albums (Official Charts)	81
Swiss Albums (Schweizer Hitparade)	29
UK Albums Sales (OCC)	44
UK Independent Albums (Official Charts)	18
