= San koji srećan sanjaš sam =

Studio album by Block Out
- Released: 1998; 2004 (reissue)
- Recorded: January 18 – June 15, 1998
- Studio: Akademija studio, Belgrade
- Genre: Alternative rock, art rock, acoustic rock, doom metal, psychedelic rock
- Length: 72:26
- Label: Metropolis Records; Multimedia Records (reissue)
- Producer: Aleksandar Radosavljević

Block Out chronology
Godina sirotinjske zabave (1996)	San koji srećan sanjaš sam (1998)	Ako imaš s kim i gde (2004)

San koji srećan sanjaš sam (trans. A Dream You Happily Dream Alone) is the third album by the Serbian alternative rock band Block Out, released by Metropolis Records in 1998. Considered to be one of the best Serbian rock albums ever. Some of the songs were predicting war cataclysm that hit FR Yugoslavia few months after the release of the album. The album was re-released by Multimedia records in 2004.

== Track listing ==
All tracks written by Nikola Vranjković.

1. "San koji srećan sanjaš sam" (5:02)
2. "Najduži je poslednji sat" (5:39)
3. "1228 (Zečevi beli)" (5:12)
4. "Zvezdane staze" (2:49)
5. "Raskorak" (6:37)
6. "Zorka" (7:19)
7. "Blentostamin" (6:11)
8. "U krtogu" (3:33)
9. "Armatura" (5:27)
10. "Protiv sebe" (5:10)
11. "Beltaine" (2:47)
12. "Sudopera" (3:43)
13. "Finansijska konstrukcija" (4:41)
14. "Koma" (8:14)

== Personnel ==
- Miljko Radonjić (drums)
- Aleksandar Balać (bass, vocals)
- Milutin Jovančić (vocals, artwork by [design])
- Nikola Vranjković (guitar, vocals, music by, lyrics by)
- Dragoljub Marković (keyboards, vocals)

=== Additional personnel ===
- Velja Mijanović (edited by, mastered by)
- Goran Živković Žika (engineer [postproduction])
- Aleksandar Radosavljević (recorded by, producer, vocals on tracks 1, 5, 13)
- Nebojša Zulfikarpašić Keba (guitar on tracks 3, 8, 10, 13)
- Srđan Sretenović (cello on track 2)
- Nemanja Popović (vocals on track 2)
- Strahinja Milićević (vocals on track 6)
- Nemanja Kojić Kojot (trombone on track 7)
- Dejan Lalić (mandolin on track 8)
