= The Banshee (band) =

Italian indie-new wave band

The Banshee are an indie-new wave band from Genoa, Italy.

== Albums ==
They released their first album Public Talks in 2006 on Suiteside Records. "Public Talks" was released in the UK as well by the British label Fading Ways.

In 2008 The Banshee released their second effort, Your Nice Habits.

In April 2009, Oxford's Shifty Disco records (former label of Elf Power and Young Knives) released the People Around EP.

In 2015, The band released a single, Bomb Squad.
