= Block Out (album) =

Block Out DVD

Video by Block Out
- Released: 2007
- Recorded: December 23, 2005, Dom Omladine, Belgrade; Promotional videos 1994–2004
- Genres: Alternative rock, Art rock, Hard rock, Doom metal, Psychedelic rock
- Label: Multimedia Records

Professional ratings
Review scores
Source	Rating
Popboks	link

Block Out DVD is the self-titled DVD release by the Serbian alternative rock band Block Out. The DVD, featuring the December 23, 2005 Dom Omladine live recording and all the promotional videos the band recorded throughout their career, was released by Multimedia records in 2007.

== Track listing ==
=== Live at Dom Omladine Belgrade, December 23, 2005 ===
All tracks written by Nikola Vranjković.

1. "Veži me"
2. "Čarobni akord"
3. "Majdan"
4. "Deponija"
5. "Tata Brada"
6. "Trenje"
7. "Bedem"
8. "Nedostupna polja"
9. "Najduži je poslednji sat"
10. "Protiv sebe"
11. "Težak slučaj pakla"
12. "Dan koji nikad nije došao"
13. "Kad hodam"
14. "SDSS" / "GSZ"
15. "Tri korne penal"

=== Videos ===
All tracks written by Nikola Vranjković. Directed By Milutin Jovančić except where noted.

1. "Neki moji drugovi" (directed by Brana Šouc; edited by Marija Tešić, Zoran Lazarević)
2. "Devojko mala"
3. "Trenje"
4. "Sekira" (edited by Predrag Novković)
5. "Manastir" (directed by Milan Nikolić)
6. "Nedostupna polja" (directed by Milorad Milinković, Milutin Jovančić)
7. "Beltaine" (directed by Milan Nikolić, Milutin Jovančić)
8. "Protiv sebe" (director of photography Dušan Vučković; edited by Predrag Novković)
9. "Soba"
10. "San koji srećan sanjaš sam"
11. "Zvezdane staze"
12. "Tata Brada"
13. "Ako imaš s kim i gde"
14. "Majdan" (director of photography Bojan Dmitrašinović, Milan Kilibarda; edited by Milutin Jovančić)
15. "Nevremena" (directed by Bojan Dmitrašinović)

== Personnel ==
- Aleksandar Balać (bass, vocals)
- Miljko Radonjić (drums)
- Dejan Hasečić (guitar, synthesizer)
- Nikola Vranjković (guitar, vocals, producer, lyrics by, music by, mixed by)
- Milutin Jovančić (vocals, artwork by [design], edited by)

=== Additional personnel ===
- Ljuba Pejić (engineer [sound])
- Aleksandar Zec (director of photography)
- Bojan Dmitrašinović (director of photography)
- Ivan Pecikoza (director of photography)
- Marko Petrović (director of photography)
- Milan Kilibarda (director of photography)
- Milenko Petković (director of photography)
- Marko Nježić (producer, mixed by)
- Sreten Milojević (recorded by)
