= Između dva zla =

Između dva zla vol.1

Live album by Block Out
- Released: 2001
- Recorded: September 11, 1999, SKC, Belgrade; Mixed Novovemer 1999, Akademija studio, Belgrade
- Genre: Alternative rock
- Length: 70:20
- Label: Metropolis Records

Block Out chronology
| Live KST, Akademija (1993) | Između dva zla vol.1 (2001) | Između dva zla vol.2 (2001) |

Između dva zla vol.2

Live album by Block Out
- Released: 2001
- Recorded: September 11, 1999, SKC, Belgrade; Mixed Novovemer 1999, Akademija studio, Belgrade
- Genre: Alternative rock
- Length: 48:05
- Label: Metropolis Records

Block Out chronology
| Između dva zla vol.1 (2001) | Između dva zla vol.2 (2001) | Između dva zla vol.3 (2001) |

Između dva zla vol.3

Live album by Block Out
- Released: 2001
- Recorded: 1999, Live recordings from Belgrade, Niš and Zrenjanin
- Genre: Alternative rock
- Length: 50:09
- Label: Metropolis Records

Block Out chronology
| Između dva zla vol.2 (2001) | Između dva zla vol.3 (2001) |

Između dva zla is a three-part live album by the Serbian alternative rock band Block Out, recorded in 1999, and released in 2001. The first, the second and the partially the third part were recorded live at the Belgrade SKC, on September 11, 1999. The volume 3 of the album was released only on the compact cassette edition of the album.

== Volume 1 ==
Između dva zla vol. 1 (Between Two Evils Volume 1) is the first part of the second live album by the Serbian alternative rock band Block Out, recorded in 1999, and released in 2001.

=== Track listing ===
All tracks written by Nikola Vranjković.

1. "Tri korne penal" (10:06)
2. "Rođendanska" (5:01)
3. "Nedostupna polja" (6:12)
4. "Raskorak" (7:34)
5. "Zvezdane staze" (2:38)
6. "San koji srećan sanjaš sam" (4:34)
7. "Trenje" (9:36)
8. "Zečevi beli" (5:43)
9. "Čarobni akord" (4:26)
10. "Finansijska konstrukcija" (5:07)
11. "Deponija" (9:27)

== Volume 2 ==
Između dva zla vol. 2 (Between Two Evils Volume 2) is the second part of the second live album by the Serbian alternative rock band Block Out, recorded in 1999, and released in 2001.

=== Track listing ===
All tracks written by Nikola Vranjković.

1. "Kad hodam" (4:29)
2. "Devojko mala" (3:12)
3. "Vertikalno gledano" (6:50)
4. "Poštar" (3:45)
5. "Sekira" (6:23)
6. "Protiv sebe" (5:00)
7. "Sudopera" (3:25)
8. "Manastir" (3:05)
9. "Blentostamin" (6:14)
10. "SDSS" (5:42)
11. "Koma" (10:37)

== Volume 3 ==
Između dva zla vol. 3 (Between Two Evils Volume 3) is the third part of the second live album by the Serbian alternative rock band Block Out, recorded in 1999, and released in 2001. The album was released only on compact cassette, and featured recordings from Belgrade, Niš, and Zrenjanin.

=== Track listing ===
All tracks written by Nikola Vranjković.

1. "Kad hodam" (4:29)
2. "Devojko mala (Ja ne želim da odeš)" (3:12)
3. "Vertikalno gledano" (6:50)
4. "Koma" (10:35)
5. "Leto na Adi" (8:59)
6. "Elektroliza" (3:40)
7. "Neki moji drugovi" (12:24)

== Personnel ==
- Aleksandar Balać (bass)
- Miljko Radonjić (drums)
- Nikola Vranjković (guitar, vocals, music by, lyrics by)
- Dragoljub Marković (keyboards, vocals)
- Milutin Jovančić (vocals, artwork by [design])

=== Additional personnel ===
- Ivan Brusić (engineer [postproduction], mastered by)
- Aleksandar Radosavljević (mixed by)
- Grujica Bibin (photography)
- Danilo Pavićević (recorded by)
- Milan Barković (recorded by)
