= Crno, belo i srebrno =

Studio album by Block Out
- Released: 1994
- Recorded: 1994, Akademija studio, Fokus studio (tracks 6 and 11)
- Genre: Alternative rock hard rock grunge
- Length: 47:38 reissue 56:18
- Label: ITV Melomarket; Metropolis Records (reissue)
- Producer: Dejan Škopelja, Nemanja Popović, Zoran Radetić

Block Out chronology
Crno, belo i srebrno (1994)	Godina sirotinjske zabave (1996)

Professional ratings
Review scores
Source	Rating
Ritam	2/5 stars

Crno, belo i srebrno (trans. Black, White and Silver) is the debut album by the Serbian alternative rock band Block Out, released by ITV Melomarket records in 1994. The album was rereleased in 2000 by Metropolis records with the bonus track "Leto na Adi" ("Summer at Ada").

== Track listing ==
Tracks 1 to 5, written by Danilo Pavićević and Milutin Jovančić, tracks 6 to 12, written by Nikola Vranjković

1. "Sanjaj me" (3:13)
2. "Kiša" (3:14)
3. "Ljubičasto (I)" (2:45)
4. "Ljubičasto (II)" (2:28)
5. "Ja znam" (4:06)
6. "Osam i trideset" (6:06)
7. "Neki moji drugovi" (6:31)
8. "Ja ne želim da odeš" (3:25)
9. "Eutanazija" (3:54)
10. "Deponija" (6:40)
11. "Rođendanska pesma" (5:15)
12. "Leto na Adi" (Bonus track on the 2000 CD reissue) (8:40)

== Personnel ==
- Miljko Radonjić (drums)
- Dragan Majstorović (bass)
- Milutin Jovančić (vocals)
- Nikola Vranjković (guitar)

=== Additional personnel ===
- Nemanja Popović (co-producer)
- Zoran Radetić (engineer [post-production])
- Balać (Aleksandar Balać; performer)
- Krle (Dragan Jovanović; performer)
- Leontina (Leontina Vukomanović; performer)
- Madamme Piano (Ljiljana Rančić; performer)
- Nemanja (Nemanja Popović; performer)
- Peđa Milanović (performer)
- Stevan Vitas (performer)
- Antiša (performer)
- Danilo Pavićević (performer [associate band member])
- Dean Dimitrijević (performer [associate band member])
- Dejan Škopelja (producer, performer)
