= Live KST, Akademija =

Live album by Block Out
- Released: 1993
- Recorded: Akademija, KST
- Genre: Alternative rock Hard rock
- Length: 55:15
- Label: Take It Or Leave It Records

Block Out chronology
Live KST, Akademija (1993)	Između dva zla vol.1 (2001)

Live KST, Akademija is a live album and the debut release by the Serbian alternative rock band Block Out, released in 1993. The album was released only on compact cassette, and was never rereleased on compact disc.

== Track listing ==
=== Akademija (Side A) ===
1. "Kiša" (3:22)
2. "Sanjaj me" (3:07)
3. "Ljubičasto" (2:24)
4. "Pijana noć" (3:43)
5. "Boje" (3:14)
6. "Daj mi svoju ljubav" (4:07)
7. "Ja znam" (5:55)

=== KST (Side B) ===
1. "Kiša" (5:18)
2. "Ona stalno razmišlja" (8:11)
3. "Život" (6:26)
4. "Neki moji drugovi" (9:28)
