= Many Mouths Shut! =

Studio album by Orthodox Celts
- Released: January 13, 2017
- Studio: Studio Vitas, Belgrade
- Genre: Irish folk; Celtic rock
- Label: O'Celts Records
- Producer: Dejan Lalić

Orthodox Celts chronology
| One, Two... Five (2007) | Many Mouths Shut! (2017) |

Many Mouths Shut! is the sixth studio album by the Serbian Irish folk/Celtic rock band Orthodox Celts, released in 2017.

Many Mouths Shut! was preceded by the singles "Save Me", released in March 2014, and "One / Milk & Honey", released in March 2015. The album featured seven songs authored by the band and six covers of traditional Irish songs. It was produced by the band member Dejan Lalić and released through the band's own label, O'Celts Records. The album artwork, depicting members of the band as convicts in the Wild West, was designed by Italian comic book artist Walter Venturi and inspired by his work on Zagor.

== Track list ==
Many Mouths Shut! track listing
| No. | Title | Writer(s) | Length |
|---|---|---|---|
| 1. | "One / Milk & Honey" | Aleksandar Petrović; Dejan Lalić; Vladan Jovković |
| 2. | "I Wish You the Very Worst" | Aleksandar Petrović; Dejan Grujić |
| 3. | "Morrison's Jig" | Traditional |
| 4. | "Save Me" | Aleksandar Petrović; Vladan Jovković |
| 5. | "The Banshee" | Traditional |
| 6. | "King of the Hill" | Aleksandar Petrović; Dejan Grujić |
| 7. | "Flowers of Red Hill" | Traditional |
| 8. | "Lone Wolf" | Aleksandar Petrović; Vladan Jovković |
| 9. | "Revolution" | Aleksandar Petrović; Dejan Grujić |
| 10. | "Banish Misfortune" | Traditional |
| 11. | "Double Cross" | Aleksandar Petrović; Dejan Grujić |
| 12. | "Parting Glass" | Traditional |
| 13. | "Kesh Jig" | Traditional |

== Personnel ==
- Aleksandar Petrović – vocals
- Dejan Lalić - mandolin, mandola, tenor banjo, electric guitar, backing vocals, producer
- Vladan Jovković - acoustic guitar, backing vocals, engineer, design
- Nikola Stanojević - violin
- Bojan Petrović - whistles, backing vocals
- Dejan Grujić - bass, keyboards, backing vocals, engineer
- Dušan Živanović - drums, bodhrán, accordion

=== Additional personnel ===
- Nikola Vranjković - electric guitar, engineer
- Stevan Vitas - keyboards
- Walter Venturi - artwork
- Marina Bešenski - design
