= Ako imaš s kim i gde =

Studio album by Block Out
- Released: April 24, 2004
- Recorded: May–December 2003; Akademija Free Zone studio, Belgrade, Elektropionir studio
- Genres: Alternative rock, Art rock, Acoustic rock, Doom metal, Psychedelic rock
- Length: 73:59
- Label: Multimedia Records
- Producers: Nikola Vranjković; Darko Marković

Block Out chronology
San koji srećan sanjaš sam (1998)	Ako imaš s kim i gde (2004)

Ako imaš s kim i gde (trans. If You Have With Whom And Where) is the fourth studio album by the Serbian alternative rock band Block Out, released by Multimedia records in 2004.

== Track listing ==
All tracks written by Nikola Vranjković.

1. "Nevremena" – 5:08
2. "Iz tri vode" – 6:01
3. "Tata Brada" – 6:31
4. "Majdan" – 8:41
5. "Bedem" – 5:28
6. "Težak slučaj pakla" – 7:10
7. "Andrej" – 8:57
8. "Nema više lakih protivnika" – 4:14
9. "Bunar želja ne postoji" – 4:31
10. "Dan koji nikad nije došao" – 3:10
11. "Ako imaš s kim i gde" – 5:32
12. "Tehno...logija" – 8:36

== Personnel ==
- Aleksandar Balać – bass, vocals
- Miljko Radonjić – drums
- Dejan Hasečić – guitar, synthesizer
- Nikola Vranjković – guitar, vocals, producer
- Milutin Jovančić – vocals

=== Additional personnel ===
- Nemanja Popović – backing vocals
- Darko Marković – co-producer, mixed by
- Bojan Drobac – mastered by
- Branko Maćić – mastered by
- Ivan Brusić – mastered by
- Saša Janković – mixed by
- Dušan Živanović – percussion
- Marko Jovanović – recorded by
- Ana Đokić – synthesizer on track 5 and 8
- Darko Marković – guitar on track 6
- Dejan Grujić – guitar on track 9
