= Star of the County Down =

Irish ballad

"Star of the County Down" (Roud 4801) is an Irish ballad set near Banbridge in County Down, Northern Ireland. The words are by Cathal MacGarvey (1866–1927) from Ramelton, County Donegal. MacGarvey's song was first collected in Herbert Hughes' Irish Country Songs. The tune is traditional, and may be known as "Dives and Lazarus" or (as a hymn tune) "Kingsfold".

The song is sung from the point of view of a young man who chances to meet a charming lady by the name of Rose (or Rosie) McCann, referred to as the "star of the County Down". From a brief encounter the writer's infatuation grows until, by the end of the ballad, he imagines himself marrying the girl.

== Composition ==
"The Star of the County Down" uses a tight rhyme scheme. Each stanza is a double quatrain, and the first and third lines of each quatrain have an internal rhyme on the second and fourth feet: [aa]b[cc]b. The refrain is a single quatrain with the same rhyming pattern.

The song usually begins with the opening verse:

Near Banbridge town, in the County Down,
One morning last July
Down a boreen green came a sweet colleen,
And she smiled as she passed me by

== Similar songs ==
The melody was also used in an Irish folk song called "My Love Nell". The lyrics of "My Love Nell" tell the story of a young man who courts a girl but loses her when she emigrates to America. The only real similarity with "Star of the County Down" is that Nell too comes from County Down. This may have inspired MacGarvey to place the heroine of his new song in Down as well. MacGarvey was from Donegal. The chorus of a similar song, "The Flower of the County Down" names landmarks local to Down, in contrast to those in "Star" which are from across Ireland.

== Versions ==
- Belfast singer-songwriter Van Morrison recorded a version of the song for the 1988 album Irish Heartbeat, in collaboration with The Chieftains.
- The Pogues recorded a version of the song that was included the 2005 reissue of their 1989 album Peace and Love.
- Canadian singer Loreena McKennitt recorded a version of the song for her 2010 album The Wind That Shakes the Barley, and released a live version on her 2024 album The Road Back Home. Her 2008 Christmas album A Midwinter Night's Dream includes "The Seven Rejoices of Mary," which uses the melody of "Star of the County Down."
- American hurdy-gurdy artist Dora Viellette released the song on her 2023 eponymous album and on her duo Manticore Consort's 2021 release Music for the Ages.
- Serbian band Orthodox Celts recorded a version of the song for the 1997 album The Celts Strike Again.
- Israeli singer Ehud Banai recorded a Hebrew version of the song titled "Ha-Kochav shel Mechoz Gush Dan" (Hebrew: הכוכב של מחוז גוש דן or "The Star of Gush Dan District"). It appeared first on his 1998 album Tip Tipa.
- Dublin folk artist Dylan Walshe recorded a live version of the song which appeared on the 2015 album Soul Hell Cafe released on Muddy Roots Records.
- German schlager music band Santiano recorded a version of the song called "Mädchen von Haithabu" (German: "Girls from Haithabu") with the same melody.
- English progressive and medieval folk rock group Gryphon used the melody in their version of The Unquiet Grave, the sixth track on their self-titled debut album.
- American composer Rory Cooney set the hymn "Canticle of the Turning" to this tune in 1990.
- American folk-jazz band Béla Fleck and the Flecktones included an instrumental arrangement of the song in their 1991 Grammy-nominated album Flight of the Cosmic Hippo.
- Irish-Canadian band The Irish Rovers recorded versions of the song for the 1996 album Gems and the 2020 Saints and Sinners.
- Tom Rowe recorded a vocable version for his 1991 album Whistle Up a Storm.
- Irish YouTuber Colm McGuinness uploaded a version of the song to his channel in 2021 titled "The Star of the County Down (Cover)".
- British vocal ensemble The King's Singers recorded an arrangement by Howard Goodall on their albums Watching the White Wheat (1985) and Postcards (2014).
- Irish band The High Kings uploaded a version of the song to their YouTube channel in 2011 titled "Star of the County Down".
- German metal band Lyriel recorded a version of the song for the 2012 album Leverage as a bonus track.
- Irish-Scottish band Celtic Thunder released the song on their version of the song in 2015 on their album The Very Best of Celtic Thunder.
- Sheridan Rúitín arranged and recorded a version on their 2022 album Rebels in the Night.
- The Kelly Family put that song on their album 25 years later.
- The Longest Johns uploaded a version of the song featuring Colm R. McGuinness on their YouTube channel in 2024.
- The Wellermen released an arrangement on their EP “1778” in 2026.
