= Banshee (dinghy) =

Sailboat class

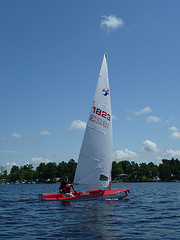

Development
- Designer: Richard L. Reid
- Location: United States
- Year: 1969
- No. built: 9,000
- Builders: Marine Plastics, Banshee International
- Role: One-design Racer
- Name: Banshee

Boat
- Crew: one
- Displacement: 115 lb (52 kg) (hull only)
- Draft: 2.75 ft (0.84 m) with the daggerboard down

Hull
- Type: Monohull
- Construction: Fiberglass
- LOA: 13.00 ft (3.96 m)
- LWL: 12.00 ft (3.66 m)
- Beam: 4.92 ft (1.50 m)

Hull appendages
- Keel: daggerboard
- Rudder: transom-mounted rudder

Rig
- Rig type: Catboat rig

Sails
- Sailplan: catboat
- Mainsail area: 88.00 sq ft (8.175 m^{2})
- Total sail area: 88.00 sq ft (8.175 m^{2})

The Banshee, sometimes called the Banshee 13, is an American sailing dinghy that was designed by Richard L. Reid as a one-design racer and first built in 1969.

== Production ==
The design was initially built by the designer himself through his company Marine Plastics in Foster City, California, United States starting in 1969. As demand increased he subcontracted construction to other companies. Barrett Bruch formed Banshee International, Inc. in Santa Cruz, California in August 1974, with Reid as vice-president, to take over construction. Additional company production capacity was added in Scotts Valley, California in 1982. A total of 9,000 boats were built, but Banshee International is no longer in business and the boat is now out of production.

Abbott Boats in Sarnia, Ontario, Canada was licensed to construct 500 Banshees, but it is unknown if that number were actually completed.

== Design ==
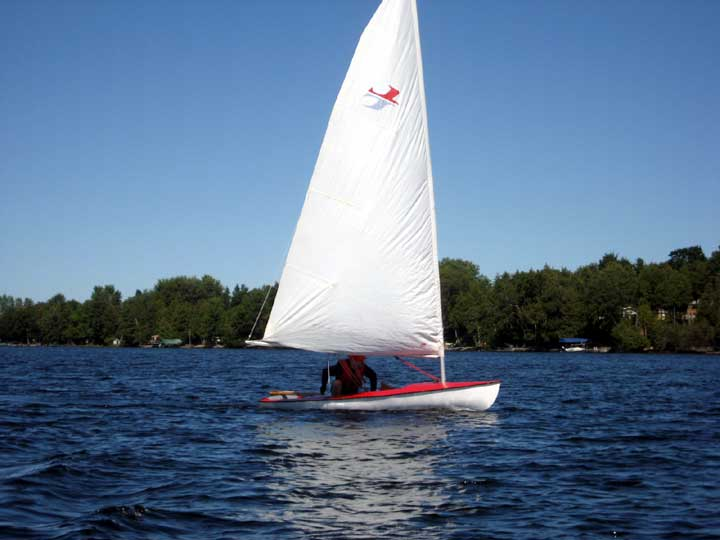
Banshee

The boat was derived from the Flying Junior hull design and envisioned by Reid as a mass-market boat, with more appeal for racing than the contemporary Sunfish.

The Banshee is a recreational sailboat, built predominantly of fiberglass, with foam flotation, making the boat unsinkable. It has an unstayed catboat rig, with aluminum spars, including a non-rotating mast, a loose-footed, four-batten mainsail, a spooned raked stem, a vertical transom, a transom-hung, kick-up rudder controlled by a tiller and a retractable daggerboard. The hull alone displaces 115 lb (52 kg).

The boat has a draft of 2.75 ft (0.84 m) with the daggerboard extended and 4 in (10 cm) with it retracted, allowing beaching or ground transportation on a trailer or car roof rack.

For sailing the boat has a boom vang, a Cunningham and an adjustable outhaul. The mast can be pivoted fore and aft, normally raked aft when sailing to windward and adjusted forward when on a run downwind. The mainsail is mounted via a sleeve over the mast and so is not hoisted by a halyard. The daggerboard may be adjusted fore-and-aft to balance the mainsail, when the sail is reefed by rolling it around the mast.

== Variants ==
Banshee
The base model has a sail of 88 sq ft (8.2 m^{2}) and a Portsmouth Yardstick racing average handicap of 94.3.
Banshee T
This model has a reduced sail area of 73 sq ft (6.8 m^{2}) to improve stability and has a Portsmouth Yardstick racing average handicap of 99.9.
Griffon (or Gryphon)
An experimental model built by Banshee International, with a slightly modified hull shape. It was made from carbon fiber with a hull weight of 80 lb (36 kg). A total of 15 were constructed.

== Operational history ==
The class rules allow modifications to the running rigging, including the sail shape, but no changes to the hull, spars or the sail.

In a 1994 review Richard Sherwood wrote that the Banshee is "a high-performance boat designed for cartopping. Maximum capacity is two, or in a pinch, three."

In 1994 it was reported that 50 fleets in five countries were racing the design.

== See also ==
- List of sailing boat types

Similar sailboats

- Laser (dinghy)
- RS Aero
