= Godina sirotinjske zabave =

Studio album by Block Out
- Released: 1996; 2004 (reissue)
- Recorded: May 1995 – July 1996; Akademija studio, Belgrade
- Genre: Alternative rock Grunge; Doom metal
- Length: 73:26
- Label: Metropolis Records; Multimedia records (reissue)
- Producer: Dejan Škopelja; Danilo Pavićević

Block Out chronology
Crno, belo i srebrno (1994)	Godina sirotinjske zabave (1996)	San koji srećan sanjaš sam (1998)

Godina sirotinjske zabave (trans. A Year of Poverty Amusement) is the second album by the Serbian alternative rock band Block Out, released by Metropolis Records in 1996. The album was rereleased by Multimedia records in 2004.

== Track listing ==
All tracks by Nikola Vranjković.

1. "Veži me" (2:45)
2. "Elektro-liza (gradski rok sa hevi elementima)" (3:30)
3. "Vertikalno gledano" (6:40)
4. "Trenje" (6:32)
5. "Gledam kao..." (1:11)
6. "Manastir" (3:20)
7. "Kad hodam" (4:19)
8. "Čarobni akord" (3:15)
9. "Godina sirotinjske zabave" (8:13)
10. "SDSS" (4:47)
11. "Poštar" (4:12)
12. "Nedostupna polja" (6:17)
13. "Sekira" (3:43)
14. "Ka zelenoj obali" (6:23)
15. "Tri korne penal" (10:20)

== Personnel ==
- Miljko (Miljko Radonjić; drums)
- Mita (Milutin Jovančić; vocals, artwork by [design])
- Trle (Dragan Majstorović; keyboards)
- Balać (Aleksandar Balać; bass)
- Nikola (Nikola Vranjković; guitar, music by, lyrics by)

=== Additional personnel ===
- Ivan Brusić (engineer [postproduction])
- Velja Mijanović (engineer [postproduction])
- Rodoljub Stojanović (executive producer, percussion on 5)
- Danilo Pavićević (guitar on 1, 5, 7, 13, 14)
- Danilo Pavićević (producer [assistant], guitar on 1, 5, 7, 13 and 14, vocals on 1 and 2)
- Aleksandar Radosavljević (producer, recorded by, engineer [postproduction], guitar on 8 and 15, backing vocals on 1 and 2)
- Dejan Škopelja (recorded by, co-producer on 4, 10, 12)
- Acika Logoped (Aleksandar Stanojević; percussion on 5)
- Vladimir Lesić (percussion on 8 and 13)
- Miša Savić Mipi (keyboards on 4)
- Đura Svarog (Zoran Đuroski; vocals on 9)
- Nebojša Zulfikaprašić Keba (guitar on 15)
- Zoran Antonijević (vocals on 8, 10, 12, 14)
- Nemanja Popović (vocals on 10 and 12)
- Dragoljub Marković (vocals on 14, keyboards on 7 and 14)
- Gordan Paunović (voice on 2)

== Legacy ==
In 2000, the song "Manastir" ("Monastery") was polled No.100 on Rock Express Top 100 Yugoslav Rock Songs of All Times list.
