= Madame Piano =

Serbian musical artist

- Born: Ljiljana Rančić
- Origin: Belgrade, Serbia
- Genres: Jazz; rock; ethnic music; world music
- Occupations: Singer, songwriter
- Years active: 1991–2004
- Labels: ITMM, Hi-Fi Centar
- Website: www.madamepiano.com

Ljiljana Rančić (Serbian Cyrillic: Љиљана Ранчић), known professionally as Madame Piano, is a Serbian retired jazz/world music singer and songwriter. She was a prominent act on the Serbian music scene in the 1990s and early 2000s, releasing three studio albums before retiring from the scene.

== Musical career ==
Ljiljana Rančić got her classical music education by learning to play violin. In the early 1990s, she started performing as a jazz singer, having her debut performance as a singer singing with actress Ana Sofrenović. In 1993, she won the first place at the Belgrade Spring Festival with the song "Sanjam" ("I'm Dreaming"). She performed on the festivals in Russia, Ukraine and Belarus, regularly performing in jazz clubs in her homeland.

Her debut recording was Vlada Maričić's composition "Caravan", which she recorded with bass guitarist Dejan Škopelja and percussionist and keyboardist Boris Bunjac, with which she appeared on the 1993 various artists compilation album Beogradska džez scena 1993. (Belgrade Jazz Scene 1993). After long work, in the autumn of 1997, she released her debut album, entitled Predeli (Landscapes). The album was produced by Madam Piano herself and Dejan Škopelja, at the time her husband and a member of the band Babe. Predeli featured a mixture of jazz, popular and ethnic music. Beside Madame Piano's own songs, the album featured songs written by Nebojša Zulfikarpašić and Nebojša Kostić, the song "Cvetak žuti" ("Yellow Flower"), a cover of a song by Loreena McKennitt, a cover of Duke Ellington's song "Caravan", and a cover of Native American song "Niya Niya Ni". The album also featured the song "Galija" ("Galley"), which she recorded with the band Orthodox Celts. She appeared on the 1998 Music Festival Budva, performing the song "Moj Jasmine" ("Oh, My Jasmine") with flutist Bora Dugić. The song was released on the festival album Budva 98.

Her second album, entitled Zemlja čuda (Wonderland), was released in 2001. Unlike Predeli, Zemlja čuda was mostly ethnic music-oriented. The album was produced and arranged, as well as partially written by Boris Krstajić. It featured Bora Dugić and vocalists Franco Masi and Raul Alberto Dias. The song "Eternal Love", a duet with Italian singer Franco Masi became a large hit. Her following album, Priče iz davnina (Tales from the Olden Times), recorded with ethnic music band Teodulija, was stylistically similar to Zemlja čuda, featuring covers of Serbian traditional songs. The album was arranged and produced by Teodulija, Branko Isaković (who also played bass guitar on the album recording) and Boris Krstajić. The album featured guest appearances by vocalists Ružica Čavić, Marija Mihajlović, Predrag "Cune" Gojković, Oliver Njego, and other musicians. Some of the songs from Priče iz davnina were used in Balkan Novi Pokret theatre group play Vilinsko kolo (Vilas' Kolo) and Boba Dedić's film Svetlost života (The Light of Life).

In 2004, she took part in Evropesma, a national final where a representative for Serbia and Montenegro in the Eurovision Song Contest 2004 was chosen. With song Igra (Game) she placed 9th. After that, she retired from the scene. In an interview from December 2011, she stated that she is working on her comeback album.

== Other activities ==
During her presence on the scene, Madame Piano taught jazz singing in the Stanković Musical High School. She currently teaches singing at Belgrade New Academy of Arts and Petar Jelić's school Kulturno sklonište (Cultural Shelter).

Madame Piano is also an astrologist. In 2012, under the pseudonym Nia Niačić, she published astrology book Odiseja 2012 (Odyssey 2012), which she co-wrote with Aleksandar Imširagić, president of Johan Kepler Institute in Belgrade, and Roy Gillett, the president of Astrological Association of Great Britain.

== Personal life ==
Madame Piano was married to musician Dejan Škopelja, who was a member of the bands U Škripcu and Babe. They have daughter named Luna. She is currently married to Marko Nedeljković. They have a son named Luka. She also started her own music school.

== Discography ==
=== Studio albums ===
- Predeli (1997)
- Zemlja čuda (2001)
- Priče iz davnina (with Teodulija, 2002)

=== Other appearances ===
- "Caravan" (Beogradska džez scena 1993., 1993)
- "Moj Jasmine" (with Bora Dugić; Budva 98, 1998)
