= Orthodox Celts =

Serbian band

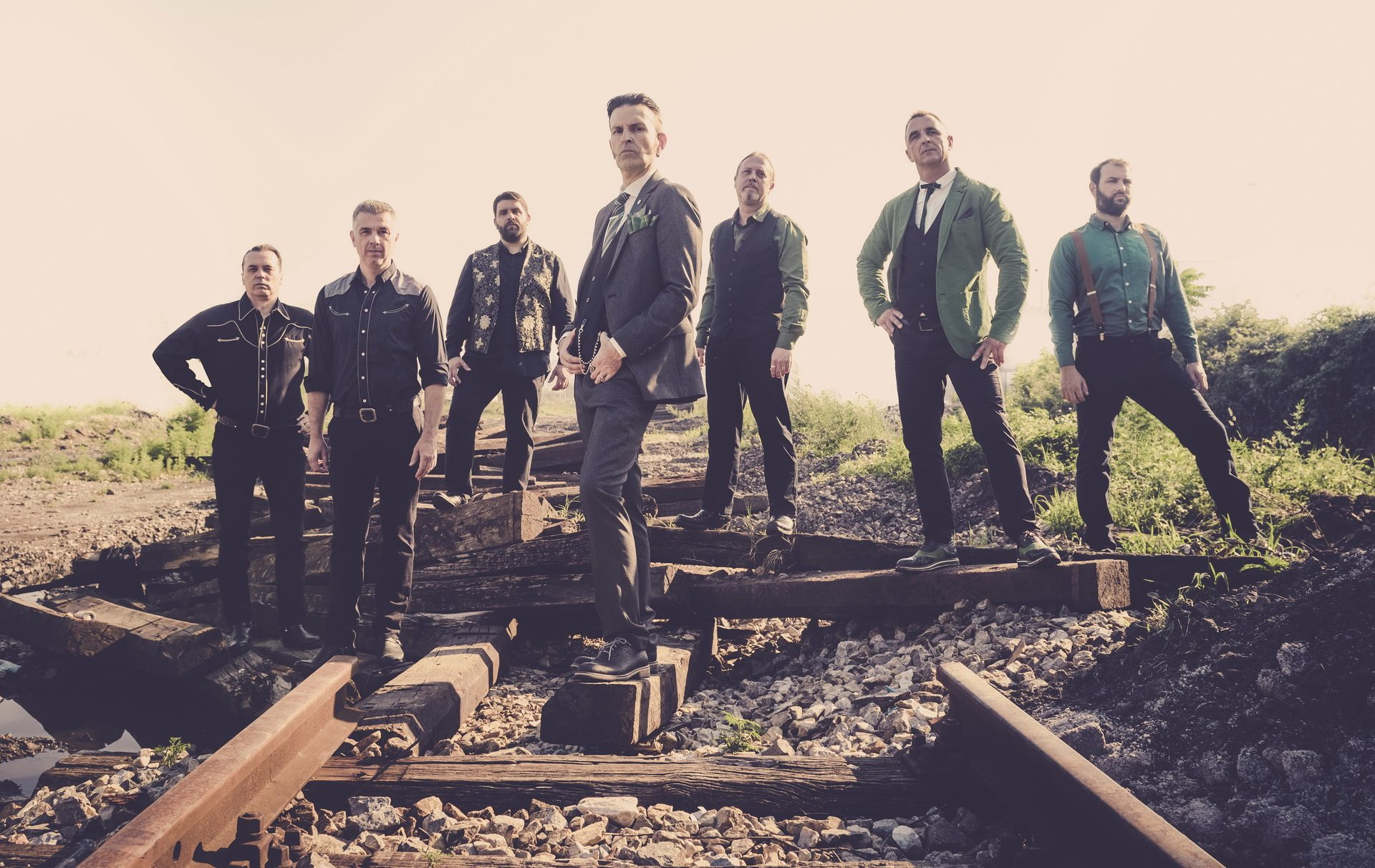
- Orthodox Celts in 2021

Background information
- Origin: Belgrade, Serbia
- Genres: Irish folk; Celtic rock
- Years active: 1992–present
- Labels: Take It Or Leave It Records, ITMM, Metropolis Records, Automatik, O'Celts Records
- Members: Aleksandar Petrović; Dušan Živanović; Dejan Lalić; Nikola Stanojević; Vladan Jovković; Dejan Grujić; Dragan Gnjatović
- Past members: Ana Đokić; Dejan Jevtović; Dejan Popin; Bojan Petrović
- Website: www.orthodoxcelts.com

Orthodox Celts is a Serbian band formed in Belgrade in 1992 which plays Irish folk music combined with rock elements. Despite their uncharacteristic genre in their home country, the band has been one of the top acts of the Serbian rock scene since their formation, and has influenced a number of younger Serbian bands, most notably Irish Stew of Sindidun and Tir na n'Og.

The band started their career performing traditional Irish songs and, gradually, introduced more and more of their own material (lyrics mostly written by the band's frontman Aleksandar "Aca Seltik" Petrović, music mostly written by band's violinist Ana Đokić). All their lyrics are in English, but the group has composed some purely instrumental songs as well. They traditionally celebrate St. Patrick's Day with a large concert in Belgrade. The group has released six studio albums to date.

== Band history ==
=== 1990s ===
During the mid-1980s, Dušan Živanović, drummer of the pub rock band Roze Poze (Pink Poses), wanted to form a band which would perform cover versions of Irish folk songs. Even though he had partially managed to fulfill this idea through some of the songs recorded by Roze Poze, in 1992 he took up playing the accordion and, with Ana Đokić (violin) and Dejan Lalić (mandolin, banjo, tin whistles), formed Orthodox Celts, which initially gathered occasionally for club performances. The band had their first official public appearance on Saint Patrick's day in 1992, at the British Council in Belgrade. At the end of the following year, vocalist Aleksandar Petrović joined the band and their performances became more frequent. The band had their first performance with Petrović on 9 November 1993 in Belgrade Youth Center. Soon the band completed the lineup with the arrival of guitarist Vladan Jovković and bassit Dejan Jevtović, with Živanović switching back to drums, also playing bodhrán on the band's performances.

The band released their debut self-titled album in 1994, featuring cover versions of twelve Irish folk songs. Among the covers appeared the songs "The Wild Rover", "The Irish Rover", "Weela Weela Walya", "All For Me Grog", "Poor Old Dicey Riley", football chant "A Grand Old Team", and others. The album featured guest appearances by Viktorija Jevtić on vocals, Sava Đustibek on guitar, Predrag Guculj on bass guitar and Lusila Gluščević on flute. The band presented the album on a series of concerts, mainly in Belgrade's Club of Technical Sciences Students, but also performed acoustic sets in smaller venues. At the same time, the band started writing their own songs, keeping up with the existing musical style. On 15 September 1995, at Synagogue in Novi Sad, they held a performance with the band Pachamama, which performed Andean music. The recording of the concert was released on the split live album Muzičke paralele (Musical Parallels) in 1996.

For the next album, The Celts Strike Again, the band, beside the cover versions of traditional songs, included two of their own songs, "Drinking Song" and "Blue". As guests on the album appeared actress Ana Sofrenović, who recorded vocals for the track "Loch Lomond", vocalist of the band Vampiri Aleksandar Eraković, who recorded backing vocals, member of the band Stočari Branko Vitas, who played banjo, Pachamama member Miljan Mihaljčić, who played khene and thin whistle, and Renesansa member Žorž Grujić, who played zurla and Serbian bagpipes. Three promotional videos were recorded for the album, for "Drinking Song", "Star Of The County Down" and the title track. In 1997, the band, with jazz and world music singer Madame Piano, recorded the song "Galija" ("Galley"), which was released on her album Predeli (Landscapes). At the time, the band presented their new member, Dejan Popin (tin whistles), and started working on their new release. In September 1998, the band represented FR Yugoslavia on the GEA ethnic music festival in Salonica.

Green Roses, released in 1999, featured sixteen songs, half of which were covers of traditional songs, and the other half their original songs. The album was produced by Aleksandar Radosavljević, and as guests appeared Dragoljub Marković (keyboards), Aleksandar Eraković (keyboards) and Goran Stojković (backing vocals). Promotional videos were recorded for the tracks "Rocky Road to Dublin / Down The River", "Merry Sisters", "Far Away", and the title track.

=== 2000s ===
In 2001, Metropolis Records re-released Orthodox Celts debut album with the band's songs from the split live album Muzičke paralele as bonus tracks. The following year, the band released their fourth studio album, A Moment Like the Longest Day. The album songs were written by Đokić (who also sang lead vocals on "Can You Get Me Out?"), Petrović, new bass guitarist Dejan Grujić (formerly of Čutura i Oblaci and Ruž) and Colette Ioanniduoi. The album featured only one cover of a traditional song, "Humors Of Scariff". Block Out leader Nikola Vranjković produced the album, and the band moved to a more rock-oriented sound than on the previous releases. Promotional videos were recorded for "Can You Get Me Out" and the title track. In 2002, Orthodox Celts performed on the Exit festival alongside Shane MacGowan, and Petrović appeared on the stage with MacGowan performing "The Irish Rover" with him.

In 2007, the band released their fifth studio album, One, Two... Five. The album, produced by Nikola Vranjković, brought eleven songs, two of which are covers of traditional songs, and one of them being a cover of the Thin Lizzy song "Sarah". Unlike the band's previous releases, for which most of the band's songs were composed by Ana Đokić, songs for One, Two... Five were composed mostly by Dejan Grujić. Several months after the album release, Đokić left Orthodox Celts, and was replaced by Nikola Stanojević. During the same year, PGP-RTS released the DVD World Music Stage, featuring the recording of performances from the Exit festival World Music Stage, including Orthodox Celts' performance.

In 2009, the band wrote and recorded the music for the Yugoslav Drama Theatre play Prevođenje (Translating), directed by Dejan Mijač.

=== 2010s ===
In 2012, Dejan Popin was replaced by Bojan Petrović, leader of the Celtic rock band Irish Stew of Sindidun. In Orthodox Celts Petrović played whistles and sung backing vocals, continuing to front his own band. In March 2012, the band held their traditional Saint Patrick's Day's day tour, including two 20th anniversary celebration concerts at the Students' Cultural Centre in Belgarade, one being an unplugged set for a limited number of visitors, and the other a standard tour set. On 12 July 2013, the band performed at the 47th Montreux Jazz Festival. In 2016, Bojan Petrović left Orthodox Celts and Dragan Gnjatović came to his place.

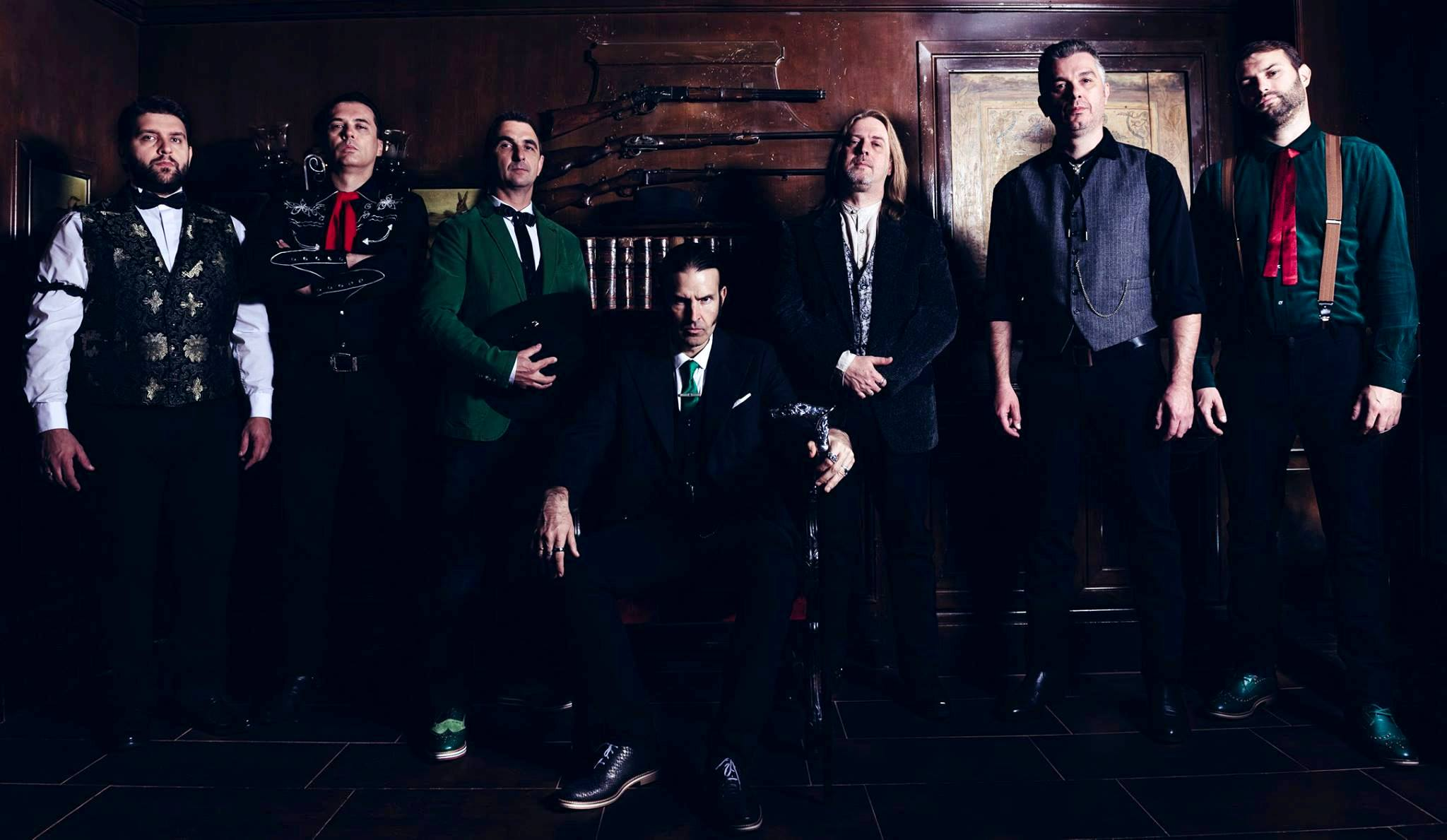
Orthodox Celts in 2017

On 13 January 2017, the band released their latest studio album, Many Mouths Shut!, previously announced by singles "Save Me", released in March 2014, and "One / Milk & Honey", released in March 2015. The album featured seven songs authored by the band and six covers of traditional Irish songs. It was produced by Dejan Lalić and released through the band's own label, O'Celts Records. The album artwork was designed by Italian comic book artist Walter Venturi and inspired by Venturi's work on Zagor. In 2018, the band performed in Ireland for the first time, in the club Fibber Magees in Dublin. In June 2020, the band, in cooperation with the Gvint brewery, launched their own brand of beer, Orthodox Celts Irish Red Lager.

=== 2020s ===
In 2023, the remastered edition of the album One, Two... Five! was released on green vinyl. In February 2024, the band appeared in the non-competitive part of Pesma za Evroviziju '24, the Radio Television of Serbia-organized contest for Serbian entry for the 2024 Eurovision Song Contest, performing a cover of "Does Your Mother Know" as a part of ABBA medley.

== Legacy ==
In 2021, the band's album Green Roses was polled 57th and the album A Moment Like the Longest Day was polled 91st on the list of 100 Best Serbian Albums Since the Breakup of SFR Yugoslavia. The list was published in the book Kako (ni)je propao rokenrol u Srbiji (How Rock 'n' Roll in Serbia (Didn't) Came to an End).

== Members ==
=== Current members ===
- Aleksandar Petrović - vocals (1993–present)
- Dejan Lalić - octave mandola, mandolin, banjo, backing vocals (1992–present)
- Nikola Stanojević - violin (2009–present)
- Vladan Jovković - acoustic guitars, backing vocals (1993–present)
- Dejan Grujić - bass guitar, backing vocals (2001–present)
- Dušan Živanović - drums, bodhran (1992–present)
- Dragan Gnjatović - tin whistles (2016–present)

=== Past members ===
- Ana Đokić - violin (1992–2009)
- Dejan Jevtović - bass guitar (1993–2001)
- Dejan Popin - tin whistles (1997–2012)
- Bojan Petrović - tin whistles (2012–2016)

== Discography ==
=== Studio albums ===
- Orthodox Celts (1994)
- The Celts Strike Again (1997)
- Green Roses (1999)
- A Moment Like the Longest Day (2002)
- One, Two... Five (2007)
- Many Mouths Shut! (2017)

=== Live albums ===
- Muzičke paralele (split live album, with Pachamama; 1996)

=== Other appearances ===
- "Galija" (with Madame Piano; Predeli, 1997)
