= Kako (ni)je propao rokenrol u Srbiji =

2021 book by Duško Antonić

- Author: Duško Antonić
- Language: Serbian
- Published: 2021 (Take It Or Leave It)
- Publication place: Serbian

Kako (ni)je propao rokenrol u Srbiji (trans. How Rock 'n' Roll in Serbia (Didn't) Came to an End) is a book by Duško Antonić, published in 2021. The book features a number of Antonić's essays on Serbian rock scene, as well as a list of 100 best Serbian rock music albums published after the dissolution of SFR Yugoslavia. The list was formed according to the poll of 58 Serbian music journalists and critics, artists and others, similarly to the poll in the 1998 book YU 100: najbolji albumi jugoslovenske rok i pop muzike (trans. YU 100: the Greatest Yugoslav Rock and Pop Music Albums) by Antonić and Danilo Štrbac.

== 100 Best Serbian Albums Published after the Breakup of SFRY ==
=== Statistics ===
==== Artists with the most albums ====
- 4 Partibrejkers
- 4 Nikola Vranjković and Block Out
- 4 Darkwood Dub
- 4 Kanda, Kodža i Nebojša
- 4 Disciplina Kičme
- 3 Bjesovi
- 3 Goblini
- 3 Van Gogh
- 3 Obojeni Program
- 2 Eva Braun
- 2 Goribor
- 2 YU Grupa
- 2 Kazna Za Uši
- 2 Vlada Divljan Old Stars Band
- 2 Električni Orgazam (including The Black Bomber soundtrack album)
- 2 Bajaga i Instruktori
- 2 Atheist Rap
- 2 Sunshine
- 2 Orthodox Celts
- 2 Ritam Nereda
- 2 Jarboli
- 2 Đorđe Balašević

==== The most successful record labels by the number of albums ====
- 20 PGP-RTS
- 15 Metropolis Records
- 10 B92
- 10 Odličan Hrčak
- 5 ITVM
- 4 Take It Or Leave It Records
- 4 Automatik Records
- 3 Mascom Records
- 2 Long Play Records
- 2 Carlo Records
- 2 Hi-Fi Centar
- 2 Multimedia Music
- 2 Sorabia Disk
- 2 Komuna
- 2 Hard Rock Shop

=== Voters ===
The voters were music journalists, critics, artists closely associated to the Serbian rock scene, and others. Each of them suggested twenty Serbian rock albums published after the breakup of SFRY Yugoslavia he or she considered the best. The book features short biographies of every one of them and each one's choice of twenty albums. The list was completed according to their poll.

- Duško Antonić – author, journalist, festival organizer
- Muharem Bazdulj – writer, journalist, translator
- Miloš Cvetković – journalist
- Milan Ćunković – journalist
- Milorad Dunđerski – journalist, concert organizer
- Nemanja Đorđević – photographer
- Miša Đurković – political and legal theorist, author
- Aleksandar Gajić – author, political analyst, former musician
- Aleksandar Gajović – journalist, politician
- Branka Glavonjić – journalist
- Saša Gočanin – journalist, Take It Or Leave It Records director
- Ivan Ivačković – journalist, author
- Miloš Ivanović – journalist, concert organizer
- Predrag "Karlo" Jakšić – author, former Carlo Records owner
- Aleksandar S. Janković – Belgrade Faculty of Dramatic Arts professor, rock critic
- Jadranka Janković – journalist
- Petar Janjatović – journalist, author
- Vladimir "Vlada Džet" Janković – radio host, musician, author
- Olga Kepčija – journalist
- Petar Kostić – journalist
- Goran Kukić – journalist, author
- Nenad Kuzmić – journalist
- Branimir Lokner – journalist
- Ivan Lončarević – journalist and music manager
- Andrea Magazin – journalist
- Igor Marojević – writer, journalist, musician
- Bogomir Mijatović – journalist, author
- Milorad Milinković – director, screenwriter, novelist, former musician
- Miloš Najdanović – journalist
- Aleksandar Nikolić – journalist
- Srđan Nikolić – journalist
- Predrag Novković – journalist
- Vladislav Pejak – concert organizer, music manager
- Zoran Panović – journalist, author
- Vojislav Pantić – math professor, journalist, art director of Belgrade Jazz Festival
- Miloš Pavlović – journalist, translator
- Marina Pešić – concert photographer
- Milan B. Popović – poet, journalist
- Branko Radaković – multimedia artist, director, musician
- Aleksandar Raković – historian
- Marko Ristić – journalist, photographer
- Ivan St. Rizinger – journalist, author, former musician
- Branko Rogošić – journalist, author
- Zoran Rogošić – journalist, author
- Branko Rosić – journalist, novelist, former musician
- Vladimir Samardžić – journalist, jazz musician
- Jovana Stanković – journalist
- Miroslav Stašić – journalist, former musician
- Gorčin Stojanović – director, journalist, author
- Danko Strahinić – photographer
- Goran Tarlać – journalist, author
- Igor Todorović – journalist, concert organizer, author, former musician
- Anamarija Vartabedijan – painter, concert photographer, teachers' training college professor
- David Vartabedijan – painter, graphic designer, journalist, author
- Jelena Vlahović – music theorist, journalist
- Aleksandar Žikić – journalist, author, former musician
- Goran Živanović – journalist, author

== Book cover ==
The book cover features a photograph of Romana Slačala of the band Artan Lili.

== See also ==
- YU 100: najbolji albumi jugoslovenske rok i pop muzike
- Rock Express Top 100 Yugoslav Rock Songs of All Times
- B92 Top 100 Domestic Songs
