= Block Out (band) =

Serbian rock band active 1990-2014

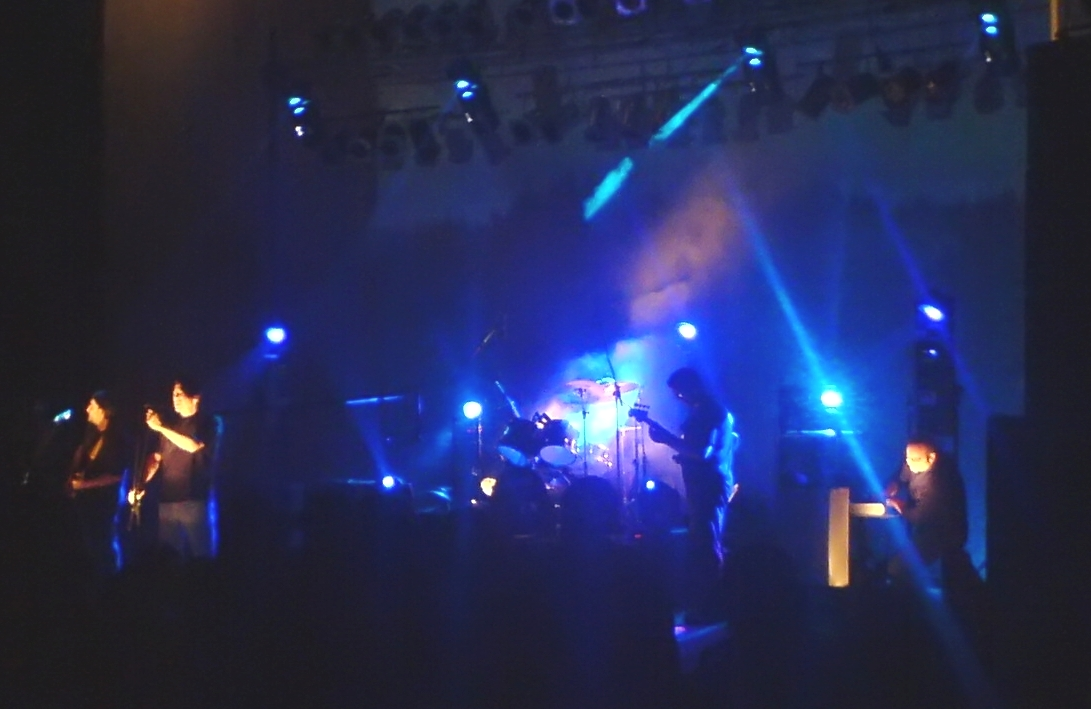
- Block Out performing live in Niš in 2007

Background information
- Origin: Belgrade, Serbia
- Genres: Alternative rock; hard rock; grunge; neo-psychedelia; art rock; doom metal
- Years active: 1990 – 2014
- Labels: Take It Or Leave It, ITMM, Metropolis Records, Multimedia Records, Long Play
- Past members: Milutin Jovančić; Nikola Vranjković; Dragan Majstorović; Danilo Pavićević; Vladan Lazarević; Dean Dimitrijević; Miljko Radonjić; Aleksandar Balać; Dragoljub Marković; Dejan Hasečić

Block Out was a Serbian alternative rock band formed in Belgrade in 1990. They were one of the most notable acts of the 1990s Serbian rock scene.

Originally formed under the name Ad Hoc, the band was initially hard rock-oriented, but moved towards darker, heavier sound with the arrival of guitarist and songwriter Nikola Vranjković in 1991, who would become the creative core of the band. The band's albums Crno, belo i srebrno (1994), Godina sirotinjske zabave (1996) and San koji srećan sanjaš sam (1998) featured a combination of alternative rock, grunge, metal and psychedelic sound, with Vranjković's poetic and dark lyrics about Serbian society in the years following the dissolution of Yugoslavia and artistic music videos created by the band's vocalist Milutin Jovančić "Mita". In 2004 the band released their last studio album, Ako imaš s kim i gde. Despite critical acclaim and large popularity, growing disagreements inside the band led to Vranjković being excluded from Block Out in 2013. Vranjković started a successful career as a solo artist and the rest of band members continued to perform as Block Out for a short period of time, before continuing their work under the name Čovek Vuk (Wolf Man).

== History ==
=== Formation and early career (1990–1993) ===
Block Out history begins with the hard rock-oriented band Ad Hoc, formed in late 1990 by Milutin Jovančić "Mita" (vocals), Dragan Majstorović "Trle" (bass guitar), Danilo Pavićević (guitar), Vladan Lazarević (guitar), and Dean Dimitrijević (drums). Due to the existence of another band under the name Ad Hoc, they decided to change their name. The band chose the name from at the time very popular computer game, Block Out, with the slang meaning of the phrase referring to the moment before losing consciousness. During 1991, Lazarević left Block Out and moved to Netherlands and Nikola Vranjković joined the band as a new guitarist, soon becoming the central creative core of the band. Vranjković previously lived for four years in Moscow and worked with many groups, including the band Besiders, which consisted of experienced Soviet musicians. On his return to Yugoslavia, Vranjković worked as a studio musician, did a tour with the pop rock band Ruž, and, alongside Voja Vijatov, performed with punk rock musician Satan Panonski.

At the beginning of the Yugoslav Wars, the band moved to London. They performed at the clubs Sick of Rock and Robby's, at Finsbury Park and at the University Centre, where they performed songs with lyrics in English. They achieved an opportunity to release a single, but it never happened due to the fact the band were forced to return to Yugoslavia. Upon their return to Belgrade in 1992, they continued their work in a new lineup, which featured, beside Jovančić, Vranjković and Majstorović, the new drummer Miljko Radonjić. In 1993 Block Out released their first recordings on the cassette tape-only release Live KST, Akademija, recorded on the band's 1991 performance in Belgrade's Akademija club and 1992 performance in Belgrade's Engineering Students' Club (KST).

=== Nikola Vranjković-led era (1994–2013) ===
In 1994 Block Out released their debut album Crno, belo i srebrno (Black, White and Silver). The first half of the album consisted of Block Out's early, hard rock-oriented songs, bringing minor hits "Sanjaj me" ("Dream of Me") and "Kiša" ("Rain"), while the second part featured darker and heavier songs written by Vranjković. In the songs like "Neki moji drugovi" ("Some of My Friends") and the ironically titled "Rođendanska pesma" ("Birthday Song") Vranjković's poetic lyrics dealt with depression and hopelessness caused by the Yugoslav Wars and the subsequent economic crisis. At the time of album release, inspired by various diverse bands such as Soundgarden, Pink Floyd, Slayer, Discharge and some older Serbian bands as Ekatarina Velika and Luna, under Vranjković's songwriting the early hard rock concept of Block Out started to move towards a darker, heavier atmosphere and sound. The album was promoted on their first solo concert, held at Belgrade's Students' Cultural Centre, featuring guest appearances by Aleksandar Balać on guitar and Leontina Vukomanović and Madame Piano on backing vocals. The album was awarded with the Best Rock Record of the Year, awarded by the Belgrade city assembly.

In early 1996, revolted by the current situation in Serbia, the band recorded the track "Leto na Adi" ("Summer on Ada"), which, due to the lack of space. was not released on their second album, but appeared as a bonus track for the 2001 reissue of Crno, belo i srebrno. In 1996 the band's second album, Godina sirotinjske zabave (The Year of Poverty Amusement), was released, featuring the material written by Vranjković during the six years of the band existence. The main themes on this album were closely related to the end of socialism and the subsequent social changes. The band's new members Aleksandar Balać on bass guitar and Dragoljub Marković (who at the time also performed with Ništa Ali Logopedi) on keyboards debuted on the album. The album was produced by Aleksandar Radosavljević and as guests appeared Danilo Pavićević (guitar), Miša Savić (keyboard) and Nebojša Zulfikaprašić (guitar).

In 1998 the band's third album, San koji srećan sanjaš sam (A Dream You Are Dreaming Alone Happy), was released. Produced by Aleksandar Radosavljević, the album brought Block Out's unique version of artistic rock, capturing a depressing picture of the reality of life in Serbia in the songs like "Zvezdane staze" ("Star Trek"), "Najduži je poslednji sat" ("The Last Hour Is the Longest"), "U krtogu" ("In the Pit") and "Armatura" ("Framework"). The album was met with wide critical acclaim. The album release was followed by artistic music videos created by Jovančić. As guests on the album appeared Nebojša Zulfikarpašić on guitar, Orthodox Celts member Dejan Lalić on mandolin, Eyesburn frontman Nemanja Kojić on trombone and Srđan Sretenović on cello.

The band performance at Belgrade's Students' Cultural Centre on 11 September 1999 was recorded and released in 2001 on the double CD/triple musical cassette release Između dva zla (Between Two Evils). The following year, Vranjković released his poetry book Zaovdeilizaponeti (Forhereorfortake). The book included his poems as well as all his lyrics written for Block Out. In addition to the book came his first solo album of the same title, characterized by calmer, minimalistic and acoustic music, but still in the vein of Block Out's melancholic atmosphere. In 2002 the band appeared on the Milan Mladenović tribute album Kao da je bilo nekad... Posvećeno Milanu Mladenoviću (Like It Happened Someday... Dedicated to Milan Mladenović), with the cover of the Ekatarina Velika track "Soba" ("Room"). In February 2003 the band entered the studio, starting to work on the album under the working title Nema više lakih protivnika (No More Easy Opponents'). In the meantime, Marković left the band and was replaced by Dejan Hasečić, a former Speed Limit and Slaves member.

In April 2004 the band released their fourth album entitled Ako imaš s kim i gde (If You Have With Whom And Where). The album was produced by Vranjković, with the complete material written by him. As guests on the album appeared Ana Đokić (synthesizer), Nemanja Popović (backing vocals), Darko Marković (guitar) and Dušan Živanović (percussion). In December 2005 the band performed at the Belgrade Youth Center, with the recording of the performance released in 2007 on the video album Block Out DVD. The album featured, beside the performance, music videos recorded during the band's career. The following year the band appeared on the Pankrti tribute album Pankrti 06, with the cover version of the song "Volkovi" ("Wolves"). In 2007 the band performed as an opening act for Kaiser Chiefs on their concert in Belgrade Arena and started writing new material. Some of the new songs, like "Fotelja" ("Armchair"), "Nikad (Dve hiljade i kusur godina)" ("Never (Two Thousand And Something Years)") and "Sve što mogu reći" ("All I Can Say"), were performed live during 2008 and 2009.

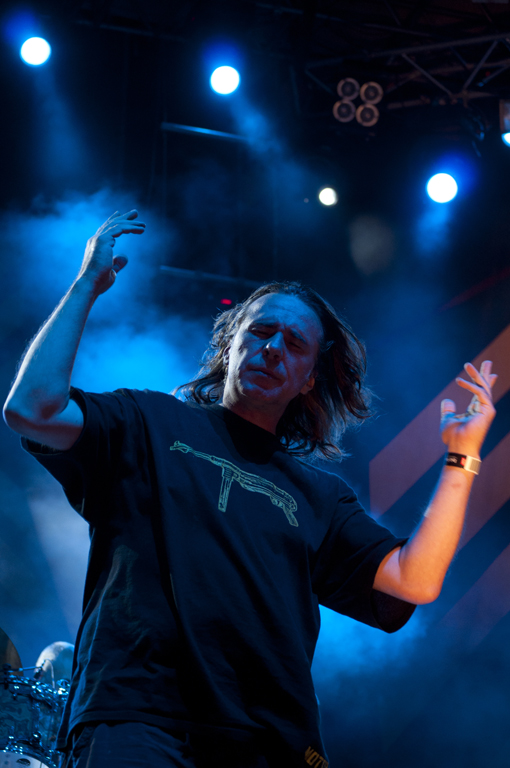
Milutin Jovančić "Mita" performing with Block Out at the 2012 Exit Festival

In 2011 the band released the CD single "Beograd spava" ("Belgrade is Sleeping"), a cover of the song by the Yugoslav band U Škripcu. The Block Out cover featured a recording of writer Miloš Crnjanski reading his poem "Lament nad Beogradom" ("Lament over Belgrade"). The CD featured the edited version of the song and a promotional video for the track. On 9 June 2012, Block Out performed, alongside Marilyn Manson, Mizar, Laibach and Dirty Vegas, at the IQ Festival, held in Belgrade Arena. In October 2012 the band released the single "Prokletije Live" ("Accursed Mountains Live"). In February 2013 the band released the single "Nikad (Dve hiljade i kusur godina)" ("Never (Two Thousand and Something Years)").

=== Vranjković's departure and breakup (2013–2014) ===
On 1 September 2013 the band had their last performance with Nikola Vranjković on a one-day festival in Niš, where they performed alongside Van Gogh and Bajaga i Instruktori. Several days after the festival, Jovančić, through his official Facebook profile, stated that Vranjković, author of all Block Out songs of the last almost 20 years, is no longer a member of Block Out. Vranjković's departure saw mixed reactions by the fans, with some expressing support to the band and others expressing doubt the band will keep the quality without Vranjković's songwriting.

Block Out continued their activity, stating they will not perform songs written by Vranjković. In December 2013 the band released the single "Reka" ("River"), which featured Riblja Čorba frontman Bora Đorđević on backing vocals, and on December 21 had their first performance without Vranjković, on a concert in Belgrade club Sioux. The concert was co-headlined by the band Popečitelji, with Block Out performance featuring Bora Đorđević as guest. During the same month, Jovančić stated that the band is working on other new songs with producer Oliver Jovanović.

In October 2014 it was announced that the remaining four members of Block Out would continue their activities under the name Čovek Vuk (The Wolf Man), stating Vranjković's acquisition of rights to the Block Out name in the Serbian Institute for the Protection of Intellectual Property as the reason for such a decision, Block Out thus ceasing to exist.

== Legacy ==
In 2021 the album Godina sirotinjske zabave was polled 20th and the album San koji srećan sanjaš sam was polled 26th on the list of 100 Best Serbian Albums Since the Breakup of SFR Yugoslavia. The list was published in the book Kako (ni)je propao rokenrol u Srbiji (How Rock 'n' Roll in Serbia (Didn't) Came to an End).

In 2000 the song "Manastir" ("Monastery") was polled No.100 on Rock Express Top 100 Yugoslav Rock Songs of All Times list.

The lyrics of 9 songs by the band were featured in Petar Janjatović's book Pesme bratstva, detinjstva & potomstva: Antologija ex YU rok poezije 1967 - 2007 (Songs of Brotherhood, Childhood & Offspring: Anthology of Ex YU Rock Poetry 1967 - 2007).

== Members ==
Final lineup

- Milutin Jovančić "Mita" – vocals (1990–2014)
- Nikola Vranjković – guitar, vocals (1991–2013)
- Aleksandar Balać "Lale" – bass guitar (1996–2014)
- Miljko Radonjić – drums (1992–2014)
- Dejan Hasečić – keyboards, guitar (2003–2014)

Former members

- Danilo Pavićević – guitar (1990–1993)
- Vladan Lazarević – guitar (1990–1991)
- Dragan Majstorović – bass guitar (1990–1995)
- Dean Dimitrijević – drums (1990–1993)
- Dragoljub Marković – keyboards (1996–2003)

== Discography ==
Studio albums

- Crno, belo i srebrno (1994)
- Godina sirotinjske zabave (1996)
- San koji srećan sanjaš sam (1998)
- Ako imaš s kim i gde (2004)
