= Film adaptation =

Films based on other media

A film adaptation transfers the details or story of an existing source text, such as a novel, into a feature film. This transfer can involve adapting most details of the source text closely, including characters or plot points, or the original source can serve as loose inspiration, with the implementation of only a few details. Although often considered a type of derivative work, film adaptation has been conceptualized recently by academic scholars such as Robert Stam as a dialogic process.

While the most common form of film adaptation is the use of a novel as the basis, other works adapted into films include non-fiction (including journalism), autobiographical works, comic books, scriptures, plays, historical sources and even other films. Adaptation from such diverse resources has been a ubiquitous practice of filmmaking since the earliest days of cinema in nineteenth-century Europe. In contrast to when making a remake, movie directors usually take more creative liberties when creating a film adaptation, changing the context of factors such as audience or genre.

== Fidelity ==
=== The Fidelity Argument ===
One aspect that is usually considered for analyzing adaptations is the fidelity argument. This regards the discussion between scholars, reviewers, or fans, evaluating the effectiveness and success of an adaptation based on how faithfully it follows the original plot and details. This can involve the common discourse of the "book being better than the movie" without considering the efforts that go towards a film adaptation.

A film can choose to stay faithful, or stray from the original source text details, but regardless, this medium is created with the use of more elements. Unlike a piece of media like a novel, a film has many aspects to consider, including the script, the music, the actors and their performances, images and shots, and sound effects. All these elements must work together to translate the source material into a feature film. As a type of media that is composed of several elements, a film's runtime often impacts the final product too.

A film adaptation may go against adhering to fidelity for a number of reasons, including the desire for a shift in the time period, cultural context, or perspective of the original plot, and a shift in overall audience. On the other hand, a film adaptation may consider strong fidelity to help promote the work if it is already tied to a popular writer or existing title, especially since it can help financially.

It can be difficult to judge or account for the effectiveness of a film adaptation based solely on fidelity, especially since an adaptation also exists as its own entity outside of the original source text. Although one can consider the original ideas and themes being consistently transposed, an adaptation can also be examined for the new elements it brings audiences.

=== Types of Fidelity ===
One way to think of fidelity as other than a measure of success is as different levels of faithfulness to help facilitate discourse. Although not all adaptations aim towards focusing on fidelity for their final product, these labels may help consider how much of a story translates through history.

==== Close Adaptation ====
A close adaptation would help define a work that adheres to fidelity closely, implementing most, if not all, details from the original source text. This would include embedding a majority of the original characters, plot points, and timeline. An example of this would include To Kill a Mockingbird (1962) that closely adapted a majority of the details from Harper Lee's 1960 novel of the same name, To Kill a Mockingbird.

==== Loose Adaptation ====
A loose adaptation would include any work that mainly uses the original source text as inspiration, straying far from fidelity. This can include instances of only implementing one or two elements, such as the protagonist or title of the original text. This type of adaptation is where the most creative liberties are taken. An example of this would include Clueless (1995), that was loosely adapted from Jane Austen's 1815 novel, Emma, into a modern day context.

==== Intermediate Adaptation ====
An intermediate adaptation would consist of a work that falls in between a close and loose adaptation, as it both embeds original source text details, takes creative liberties to incorporate new elements (such as new characters or plot points), and/or excludes certain original details. An example of this would include What's Eating Gilbert Grape (1993) that was adapted from Peter Hodge's 1991 novel of the same name, What's Eating Gilbert Grape, that closely adapts a few details, while also excluding certain original characters.

== Elision and interpolation ==
In 1924, Erich von Stroheim attempted a literal adaptation of Frank Norris's novel McTeague with his film Greed. The resulting film was 9½ hours long, and was cut to four hours at studio insistence. It was then cut again (without Stroheim's input) to around two hours. The result was a film that was largely incoherent. Since that time, few directors have attempted to put everything in a novel into a film. Therefore, elision is all but essential.

In some cases, film adaptations also interpolate scenes or invent characters. This is especially true when a novel is part of a literary saga. Incidents or quotations from later or earlier novels will be inserted into a single film. Additionally and far more controversially, filmmakers will invent new characters or create stories that were not present in the source material at all. Given the anticipated audience for a film, the screenwriter, director or movie studio may wish to increase character time or to invent new characters. For example, William J. Kennedy's Pulitzer Prize-winning novel Ironweed included a short appearance by a prostitute named Helen. Because the film studio anticipated a female audience for the film and had Meryl Streep for the role, Helen became a significant part of the film. However, characters are also sometimes invented to provide the narrative voice.

== Interpretation as adaptation ==
There have been several notable cases of massive inventive adaptation, including the Roland Joffe adaptation of The Scarlet Letter with explicit sex between Hester Prynn and the minister and Native American obscene puns into a major character and the film's villain. The Charlie Kaufman and "Donald Kaufman" penned Adaptation, credited as an adaptation of the novel The Orchid Thief, was an intentional satire and commentary on the process of film adaptation itself. The creators of the Gulliver's Travels miniseries interpolated a sanity trial to reflect the ongoing scholarly debate over whether or not Gulliver himself is sane at the conclusion of Book IV. In those cases, adaptation is a form of criticism and recreation as well as translation.

Change is essential and practically unavoidable, mandated both by the constraints of time and medium, but how much is always a balance. Some film theorists have argued that a director should be entirely unconcerned with the source, as a novel is a novel and a film is a film, and the two works of art must be seen as separate entities. Since a transcription of a novel into film is impossible, even holding up a goal of "accuracy" is absurd. Others argue that what a film adaptation does is change to fit (literally, adapt), and the film must be accurate to the effect (aesthetics), the theme, or the message of a novel and that the filmmaker must introduce changes, if necessary, to fit the demands of time and to maximize faithfulness along one of those axes.

In most cases of adaptation, the films are required to create identities (for example, a characters' costume or set decor) since they are not specified in the original material. Then, the influence of filmmakers may go unrecognized because there is no comparison in the original material even though the new visual identities will affect narrative interpretation. Peter Jackson's adaptations of The Lord of the Rings trilogy and The Hobbit by author JRR Tolkien represent an unusual case since many visual and stylistic details were specified by Tolkien. For the Harry Potter film series, author JK Rowling was closely consulted by the filmmakers, and she provided production designer Stuart Craig with a map of Hogwarts' grounds and also prevented director Alfonso Cuarón from adding a graveyard scene because the graveyard would appear elsewhere in a later novel.

An often overlooked aspect of film adaptation is the inclusion of sound and music. In a literary text, a specific sound effect can often be implied or specified by an event, but in the process of adaptation, filmmakers must determine the specific sound characteristics that subliminally affects narrative interpretation. In some cases of adaptation, music may have been specified in the original material (usually diegetic music). In Stephenie Meyer's 2005 Twilight novel, the characters Edward Cullen and Bella Swan both listen to Debussy's Clair de lune and Edward composes the piece Bella's Lullaby for Bella. While Clair de lune was a pre-existing piece of music, Bella's Lullaby was not and required original music to be composed for the 2008 movie adaptation.

In the 2016 sci-fi film 2BR02B: To Be or Naught to Be adapted from the story by Kurt Vonnegut, the filmmakers decided to abandon Vonnegut's choice of music. They stated that they felt that it worked in his prose only because it was not actually heard. Filmmakers' test screenings found that Vonnegut's style of music confused audiences and detracted from narrative comprehension. The film's composer, Leon Coward, stated, "You can try to be as true to Vonnegut's material as possible, but at the end of the day also you’re working with the material that you as a team have generated, not just Vonnegut's, and that’s what you've got to make work."

== Theatrical adaptation ==
Stage plays are frequent sources for film adaptations.

Many of William Shakespeare's plays, including Hamlet, Romeo and Juliet, and Othello, have been adapted into films. The first sound adaptation of any Shakespeare play was the 1929 production of The Taming of the Shrew, starring Mary Pickford and Douglas Fairbanks. It was later adapted as both a musical play called Kiss Me, Kate, which opened on Broadway in 1948, and as the 1953 Hollywood musical of the same name. The Taming of the Shrew was again retold in 1999 as a teen comedy set in a high school in 10 Things I Hate about You, and also in 2003 as an urban romantic comedy, Deliver Us from Eva. The 1961 musical film West Side Story was adapted from Romeo and Juliet, with its first incarnation as a Broadway musical play that opened in 1957. The animated film The Lion King (1994) was inspired by Hamlet as well as various traditional African myths, and 2001's O was based on Othello.

Film adaptations of Shakespeare's works in languages other than English are numerous, including Akira Kurosawa's films Throne of Blood (1957, an epic film version of Macbeth), The Bad Sleep Well (1960, inspired by Hamlet) and Ran (1985, based on King Lear); and Vishal Bhardwaj's "Shakespearean trilogy" consisting of Haider (2014, a retelling of Hamlet), Omkara (2006, based on Othello) and Maqbool (2003, based on Macbeth).

Another way in which Shakespearean texts have been incorporated in films is to feature characters who are either actors performing those texts or characters who are somehow influenced or effected by seeing one of Shakespeare's plays, within a larger non-Shakespearean story. Generally, Shakespeare's basic themes or certain elements of the plot will parallel the main plot of the film or become part of a character's development in some way. Hamlet and Romeo and Juliet are the two plays which have most often been used in this way. Éric Rohmer's 1992 film Conte d'hiver (A Tale of Winter) is one example. Rohmer uses one scene from Shakespeare's A Winter's Tale as a major plot device within a story that is not based on the play at all.

In Britain, where stage plays tend to be more popular as a form of entertainment than currently in the United States, many films began as a stage productions. Some British films and British/American collaborations that were based on successful British plays include Gaslight (1940), Blithe Spirit (1945), Rope (1948), Look Back in Anger (1959), Oh! What a Lovely War (1969), Sleuth (1972), The Rocky Horror Picture Show (1975), Shirley Valentine (1989), The Madness of King George (1994), The History Boys (2006), Quartet (2012), and The Lady in the Van (2015).

Similarly, hit Broadway plays are often adapted into films, whether from musicals or dramas. Some examples of American film adaptations based on successful Broadway plays are Arsenic and Old Lace (1944), Born Yesterday (1950), Harvey (1950), A Streetcar Named Desire (1951), The Odd Couple (1968), The Boys in the Band (1970), Agnes of God (1985), Children of a Lesser God (1986), Glengarry Glen Ross (1992), Real Women Have Curves (2002), Rabbit Hole (2010), and Fences (2016).

On one hand, theatrical adaptation does not involve as many interpolations or elisions as novel adaptation, but on the other, the demands of scenery and possibilities of motion frequently entail changes from one medium to the other. Film critics will often mention if an adapted play has a static camera or emulates a proscenium arch. Laurence Olivier consciously imitated the arch with his Henry V (1944), having the camera begin to move and use color stock after the prologue, indicating the passage from physical to imaginative space. Sometimes, the adaptive process can continue after one translation. Mel Brooks' The Producers began as a film in 1967, was adapted into a Broadway musical in 2001, and then adapted again in 2005 as a musical film.

== Television adaptation ==
Feature films are occasionally created from television series or television segments, or vice versa, a television series will derive from a film, such as in the case of Bates Motel and Chucky. In the former, the film will offer a longer storyline than the usual television program's format and/or expanded production values. During the 1970s, many British television series were turned into films including Dad's Army, On the Buses, Steptoe and Son and Porridge. In 1979, The Muppet Movie was a big success. In the adaptation of The X-Files to film, greater effects and a longer plotline were involved. Additionally, adaptations of television shows will offer the viewer the opportunity to see the television show's characters without broadcast restrictions. These additions (nudity, profanity, explicit drug use, and explicit violence) are only rarely a featured adaptive addition (film versions of "procedurals" such as Miami Vice are most inclined to such additions as featured adaptations) – South Park: Bigger, Longer & Uncut is a notable example of a film being more explicit than its parent TV series.

At the same time, some theatrically released films are adaptations of television miniseries events. When national film boards and state-controlled television networks co-exist, filmmakers can sometimes create very long films for television that they may adapt solely for time for theatrical release. Both Ingmar Bergman (notably with Fanny and Alexander but with other films as well) and Lars von Trier have created long television films that they then recut for international distribution.

Even segments of television series have been adapted into feature films. The American television sketch comedy show Saturday Night Live has been the origin of a number of films, beginning with The Blues Brothers, which began as a one-off performance by Dan Aykroyd and John Belushi.

== Radio adaptation ==
Radio narratives have also provided the basis of film adaptation. In the heyday of radio, radio segments were often translated to film, usually as shorts. Radio series turned into film series include Dr. Christian, Crime Doctor and The Whistler. Dialog-heavy stories and fantastic stories from radio were also adapted to film (e.g. Fibber McGee and Molly and The Life of Riley). The Hitchhiker's Guide to the Galaxy began as a radio series for the BBC and then became a novel that was adapted to film.

== Comic book adaptation ==
American comic book characters, particularly superheroes, have long been adapted into film, beginning in the 1940s with Saturday movie serials aimed at children. Superman (1978) and Batman (1989) are two later successful movie adaptations of famous comic book characters. In the Philippines, superhero comics have been adapted numerous times into films such as Darna (1951), Captain Barbell (1964), and Lastik Man (1965). In addition, comics of various genres other than those involving superheroes such as romance, fantasy and drama have widely been used as a source for film adaptations such as Roberta (1951), Dyesebel (1953), Ang Panday (1980), Bituing Walang Ningning (1985) and Mars Ravelo's Bondying: The Little Big Boy (1989). In the early 2000s, blockbusters such as X-Men (2000) and Spider-Man (2002) have led to dozens of superhero films. The success of these films has also led to other comic books not necessarily about superheroes being adapted for the big screen, such as Ghost World (2001), From Hell (2001), American Splendor (2003), Sin City (2005), 300 (2007), Wanted (2008), and Whiteout (2009).

The adaptation process for comics is different from that of novels. Many successful comic book series last for several decades and have featured several variations of the characters in that time. Films based on such series usually try to capture the back story and “spirit” of the character instead of adapting a particular storyline. Occasionally, aspects of the characters and their origins are simplified or modernized.

Self-contained graphic novels, and miniseries many of which do not feature superheroes, can be adapted more directly, such as in the case of Road to Perdition (2002) or V for Vendetta (2006). In particular, Robert Rodriguez did not use a screenplay for Sin City but utilized actual panels from writer/artist Frank Miller's series as storyboards to create what Rodriguez regards as a "translation" rather than an adaptation.

Furthermore, some films based on long-running franchises use particular story lines from the franchise as a basis for a plot. The second X-Men film was loosely based on the graphic novel X-Men: God Loves, Man Kills and the third film on the storyline "The Dark Phoenix Saga". Spider-Man 2 was based on the storyline "Spider-Man No More!". Likewise, Batman Begins owes many of its elements to Miller's Batman: Year One and the film's sequel, The Dark Knight, uses subplots from Batman: The Long Halloween.

The Marvel Cinematic Universe starting in 2008 is a shared universe with films combining characters from different works by Marvel Comics. The DC Extended Universe starting in 2013 uses the same model for DC Comics.

The highest-grossing and most profitable comic book adaptations are Avengers: Endgame (2019) and Joker (2019), respectively.

== Video game adaptation ==
A video game adaptation is primarily a film that is based on a video game, usually incorporating elements of the game's plot or gameplay, beginning in the mid-1980s. Tie-in video games with films or other properties have existed since home consoles and arcade games of the early 1980s. Developers are usually limited by what they can do with the film property, and may be further limited in time as to produce the game in time for the release of the film or other work.

Films closely related to the computer and video game industries have also been created, such as Tron, Cloak & Dagger, Wreck-It Ralph, Pixels, Ready Player One and Free Guy but only after the release of several films based on well-known brands has this genre become recognized in its own right.

== Adaptations from other sources ==
While documentary films have often been made from journalism and reportage, so too have some dramatic films, including: All the President's Men (1976, adapted from the 1974 book); Miracle, (2004, from an account published shortly after the 1980 "miracle on ice"); and Pushing Tin (1999, from a 1996 New York Times article by Darcy Frey). An Inconvenient Truth is Al Gore's film adaptation of his own Keynote multimedia presentation. The 2011 independent comedy film, Benjamin Sniddlegrass and the Cauldron of Penguins was based on Kermode and Mayo's Film Review of Percy Jackson & the Olympians: The Lightning Thief.

Films adapted from songs include Coward of the County, Ode to Billy Joe, Convoy, and Pretty Baby (each from a song of the same name).

Films based on toys include the Transformers franchise and the G.I. Joe films; there is a longer history of animated television series being created simultaneous to toy lines as a marketing tool. Hasbro's plans to for films based on their board games began with 2012's Battleship. While amusement park rides have often been based on action movies, conversely the 1967 Pirates of the Caribbean ride at Disneyland was adapted into Pirates of the Caribbean: The Curse of the Black Pearl in 2003.

Remakes and film sequels are technically adaptations of the original film. Less direct derivations include The Magnificent Seven from The Seven Samurai, Star Wars from The Hidden Fortress, and 12 Monkeys from La Jetée.

Many films have been made from mythology and religious texts. Both Greek mythology and the Bible have been adapted frequently. Homer's works have been adapted multiple times in several nations. In these cases, the audience already knows the story well, and so the adaptation will de-emphasize elements of suspense and concentrate instead on detail and phrasing.

== Awards ==
Many major film award programs present an award for adapted screenplays, separate from the award for original screenplays.

In the case of a film which was adapted from an unpublished work, however, different awards have different rules around which category the screenplay qualifies for. In 1983, the Canadian Genie Awards rescinded the Best Adapted Screenplay award they had presented to the film Melanie when they learned that the original work had been unpublished; and in 2017, the film Moonlight, which was adapted from an unpublished theatrical play, was classified and nominated as an adapted screenplay by some awards but as an original screenplay by others.

== Adaptation of films ==
When a film's screenplay is original, it can also be the source of derivative works such as novels and plays. For example, movie studios will commission novelizations of their popular titles or sell the rights to their titles to publishing houses. These novelized films will frequently be written on assignment and sometimes written by authors who have only an early script as their source. Consequently, novelizations are quite often changed from the films as they appear in theatres.

Novelization can build up characters and incidents for commercial reasons (e.g., to market a card or computer game, to promote the publisher's "saga" of novels, or to create continuity between films in a series).

There have been instances of novelists who have worked from their own screenplays to create novels at nearly the same time as a film. Both Arthur C. Clarke, with 2001: A Space Odyssey, and Graham Greene, with The Third Man, have worked from their own film ideas to a novel form (although the novel version of The Third Man was written more to aid in the development of the screenplay than for the purposes of being released as a novel). Both John Sayles and Ingmar Bergman write their film ideas as novels before they begin producing them as films, although neither director has allowed these prose treatments to be published.

Finally, films have inspired and been adapted into plays. John Waters's films have been successfully mounted as plays; both Hairspray and Cry-Baby have been adapted, and other films have spurred subsequent theatrical adaptations. Spamalot is a Broadway play based on Monty Python films. In a rare case of a film being adapted from a stage musical adaptation of a film, in 2005, the film adaptation of the stage musical based on Mel Brooks' classic comedy film The Producers was released.

== See also ==
- Remake
- Literary adaptation
- Adaptation (arts)
- Licensed game
- AACTA Award for Best Adapted Screenplay
- Academy Award for Best Adapted Screenplay
- BAFTA Award for Best Adapted Screenplay
- César Award for Best Adaptation
- Golden Horse Award for Best Adapted Screenplay
- Goya Award for Best Adapted Screenplay
- Satellite Award for Best Adapted Screenplay
- Writers Guild of America Award for Best Adapted Screenplay
