= La Mantovana =

16th-century popular Italian song

"La Mantovana" or "Il Ballo di Mantova" ("The Mantuan Dance") is a popular sixteenth-century song attributed to the Italian tenor Giuseppe Cenci, also known as Giuseppino del Biado, (d. 1616) to the text "Fuggi, fuggi, fuggi da questo cielo." Its earliest known appearance in print is in Biado's collection of madrigals of the year 1600. The melody, later also known as "Ballo di Mantova" and "Aria di Mantova", gained a wide popularity in Renaissance Europe, being recorded variously as the Flemish "Ik zag Cecilia komen", the Polish "Pod Krakowem", the Romanian "Carul cu boi", the Scottish "My mistress is prettie", the Norwegian "Lisa gikk til skolen", and the Ukrainian "Kateryna Kucheryava". It is best known as the melody of Bedřich Smetana's Vltava and of the Israeli national anthem "Hatikvah".

== Appearances in classical music ==
"La Mantovana" appears in Il Scolaro ("The Schoolboy") by Gasparo Zanetti (1645), as "Ballo di Mantova" in Duo tessuti con diversi solfeggiamenti, scherzi, perfidie et oblighi by Giuseppe Giamberti (1657) and as "An Italian Rant" in John Playford's The Dancing Master (3rd edition, 1665).

"Fuggi, fuggi, dolente cor", a version of the madrigal setting, provides the source material for Biagio Marini's 1655 trio sonata in G minor (Op. 22, Sonata sopra "Fuggi dolente core").

The melody was famously used by the Czech composer Bedřich Smetana in his symphonic poem Vltava (Moldau) from his cycle celebrating Bohemia, Má vlast:

The motif was also used by the French composer Camille Saint-Saëns in the second movement of "Rhapsodie Bretonne". "La Montavana" also appears in the song "Kucheriava Katerina", whose composer is unknown.

Samuel Cohen, a nineteenth-century Jewish settler in Ottoman Palestine (now, Israel) who was born in Moldavia, adapted a Romanian variation of "La Mantovana" – "Carul cu boi" – to set Naftali Herz Imber's poem, "Hatikvah"; which later became the Israeli national anthem. Another, similar Romanian folk song, "Cucuruz cu frunza-n sus", is also based on "La Mantovana".

== Lyrics ==
Italian

Fuggi fuggi fuggi da questo cielo
Aspro e duro spietato gelo
Tu che tutto imprigioni e leghi
Né per pianto ti frangi o pieghi
fier tiranno, gel de l'anno
fuggi fuggi fuggi là dove il Verno
su le brine ha seggio eterno.

Vieni vieni candida vien vermiglia
tu del mondo sei maraviglia
Tu nemica d'amare noie
Dà all'anima delle gioie
messagger per Primavera
tu sei dell'anno la giovinezza
tu del mondo sei la vaghezza.

Vieni vieni vieni leggiadra e vaga
Primavera d'amor presaga
Odi Zefiro che t'invita
e la terra che il ciel marita
al suo raggio venga Maggio
vieni con il grembo di bei fioretti,
Vien su l'ale dei zefiretti.

English

Flee, flee, flee from this sky,
harsh and unyielding, relentless cold.
You, who shackle all in prison
neither bending nor breaking to tears.
You, the year's cruel, frozen tyrant,
flee, flee, flee to wherever winter
has its eternal throne over the frost.

Come, come white, come vermilion,
you are the marvel of the world.
You, nemesis of all things dreary,
give joy to the soul
through your message of spring.
You are the youth of the year
and the beauty of the world.

Come, come, come, graceful and gentle,
spring of foreboding love.
Harken Zephyrus who invites you,
and the earth that marries the sky;
may May come at its ray,
come with your lap full of beautiful blossoms,
come on the wings of little Zephyrs.
