= Shmuel Yankev Imber =

Polish Jewish poet and publicist

- שמואל יאַנקעוו(?) אימבער
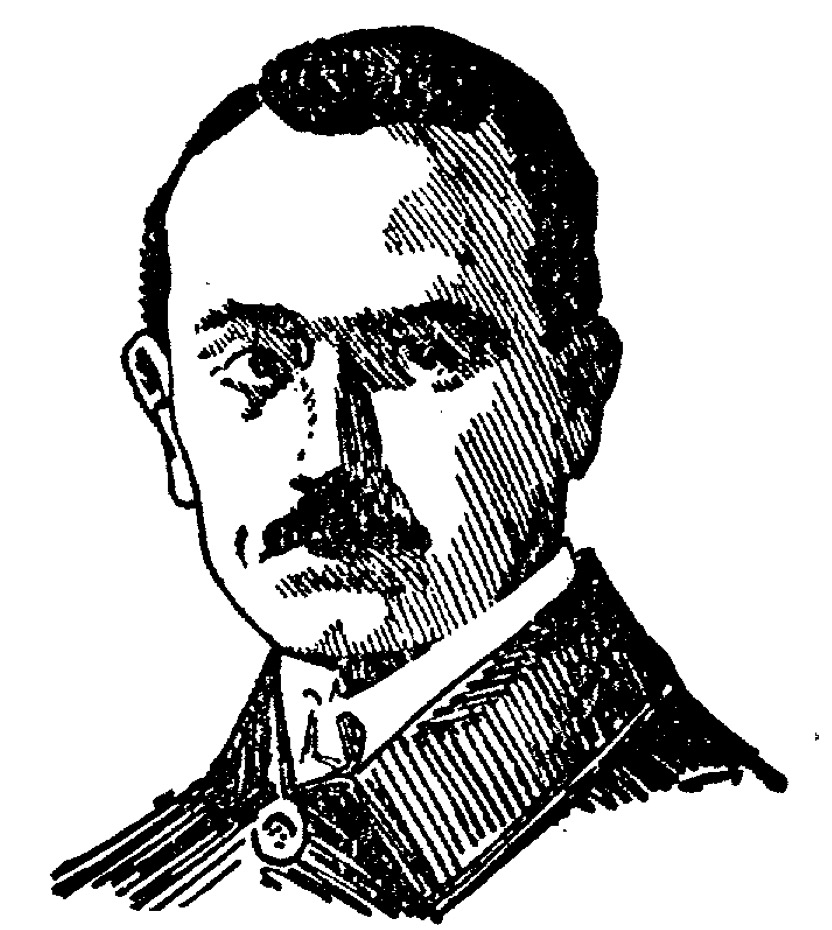
- Born: 24 February 1889; Sasów or Jezierna
- Died: 1942 (aged 52–53); Złoczów or Jezierna
- Citizenship: Polish
- Education: University of Lviv; Jagiellonian University (doctorate)
- Spouse: Nussia Imber (nee Muncz)
- Relatives: Shmaryahu Imber father Naftali Herz Imber uncle
- Writing career
- Pen name: Jan Niemiara
- Language: Yiddish, Polish
- Genre: neo-romantism
- Notable works: Vos Ikh Zing un Zog; Esterke; Asy czystej rasy Kąkol na roli

Shmuel Yankev Imber (Russian: Шмуэль Яков Имбер, Hebrew: שמואל יעקב אימבר, Polish: Samuel Jakub Imber, also: Samuel Jacob Imber; 24 February 1889 – 1942) was a Jewish poet and publicist writing in Polish and Yiddish. He was regarded as one of the originators and trailblazers of Yiddish poetry in Galicia, and popularized it in big intellectual centers. He was one of the first neo-romantics of Yiddish poetry.

== Life ==
Imber was born in Galicia (some sources claim in Sasów, some in Jezierna) on 24 February 1889, as a son of the Hebrew writer and teacher Shmaryahu Imber and nephew of Naftali Herz Imber, the author of Hatikvah. Shmuel Yankev received traditional Jewish religious education, and also went to Polish gymnasiums in Złoczów and Tarnopol. As a poet he debuted in the weekly newspaper Tshernovitser Vokhnblat in 1905. In 1907 he published Polish translations of Jewish and Ukrainian literature, and also his own poems under the nom de plume Jan Niemiara. Together with Melech Ravitch from 1909, he strove to promote the aesthetic ideals of neo-romanticism in Lviv Jewish literary centers, inspired by Jewish writers such as Arthur Schnitzler and Stefan Zweig. In this year he also published his first Yiddish poetry collection Vos Ikh Zing un Zog (What I Sing And Say). In 1911 he published a romantic poem Esterke about a legendary romance of Polish king Casimir III the Great and daughter of a Jewish blacksmith, that gained him a further recognition and acclaim.

In 1911 he started studies in English and Polish literature at the University of Lemberg. In 1912 he visited Palestine, which resulted in publication of In Yidishn Land (In Jewish Land) in 1912, later republished in Vienna in 1918 as Heymlider (Home Poems). In 1914 he published love poems in a tome Royznbleter (Rose Flowers). Imber was unable to complete his studies because he was recruited into the Austro-Hungarian Army in 1915. After the Lemberg pogrom in November 1918, he traveled to Vienna and joined a group of Jewish authors and continued to write and edit. There, along with other neo-romantic Yiddish poets such as Ravitch, Melech Chmelnitzky, Dovid Königsberg, and Uri Zvi Greenberg, Imber formed the group known as Young Galicia, that began to merge traditional poetry with modern formal experimentation popular in Vienna. Königsberg called Imber the “head” of the movement (and himself the "heart"). In 1918 they published an anti-war poetry anthology Inter Arma, redacted by Imber. After several month of travel in 1921, Imber returned to now-independent Poland and settled in Lwów, where he finished his studies.

In 1923–1928 he lived in the US, where he redacted a political and literary magazine Di Gegenwart, and an anthology Modern Yiddish Poetry (Latin transcription; New York, 1927). After returning to Poland in 1928 he moved to Kraków for a while and concentrated on publicist work, mostly in Polish. He completed his academic studies and earned a doctorate degree from Jagiellonian University on 25 June 1932, based on the dissertation Oskar Wilde jako poeta liryczny (Oscar Wilde as a lyrical poet) written under supervision of Professor Roman Dyboski. The dissertation was published as Pieśń i dusza Oskara Wilde'a in 1934. His polemic journalist work, mostly about rising antisemitism in Poland, was published in books Asy czystej rasy (Pure-breed Aces, 1934) and Kąkol na roli (Corncockle on the Field, 1938).

Imberg spent the early years of the war in his family regions. He remained in Lviv when it was annexed by the Soviet Union. He did not survive the war, and the circumstances of his death are unclear. According to some biographers, he was murdered in Złoczów or Jeziorna, most likely by Ukrainian antisemites during pogroms following the Nazi occupation in 1942.

== Works ==
- Vos Ikh Zing un Zog (1909)
- Esterke (1911)
- In Yidishn Land (1912)
- Royznbleter (1914)
- Vald Oys Vald Ayn (1920)
- Viktorya (1920)
- Geklibene Dikhtungen (1921)
- Pieśń i dusza Oskara Wilde'a (1934)
- Asy czystej rasy (1934)
- Kąkol na roli (1938)
