= Vlatava =

Vlatava may refer to:

- Vltava, the longest river in the Czech Republic.
  - A movement of Smetana's symphonic poem cycle Ma Vlast
- Vlatava (comics), a fictional country in the DC Comics universe.
