= Shmuel Cohen =

Moldavian composer of Israel's national anthem (1870–1940)

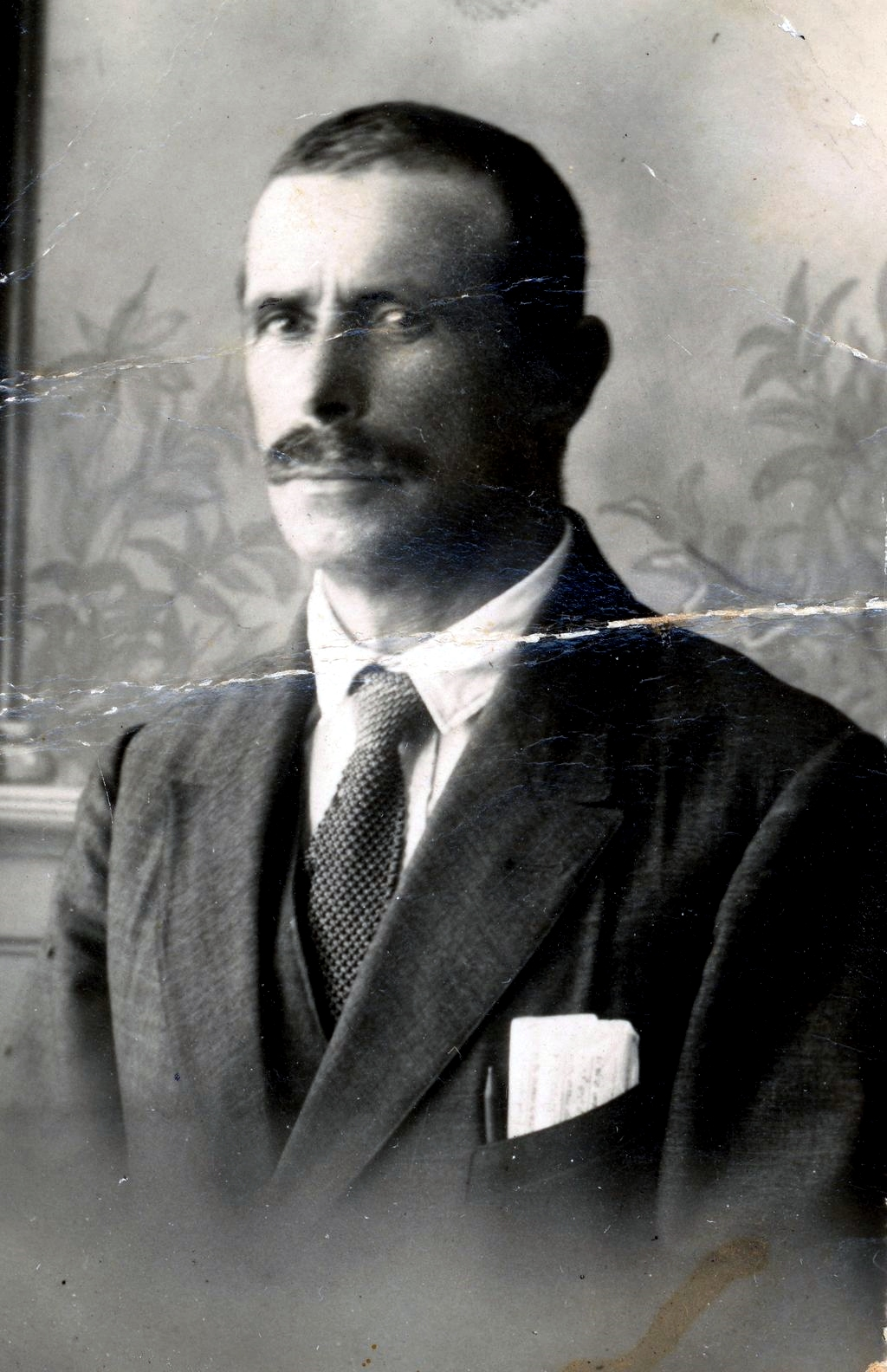
- Born: 1870 near Ungheni, Moldavia, Russian Empire
- Died: 1940 (aged 69–70); Rishon LeZion, Mandatory Palestine
- Occupations: Composer, vintner
- Known for: Composing the music for Hatikvah
- Spouse: Minya Papirmeister
- Children: Ida

Shmuel Cohen (1870–1940) was a Bessarabian-born Jewish musician who composed the music for the Israeli national anthem, "Hatikvah".

== Biography ==
Samuel (Shmuel) Cohen was born in a small town near Ungheni, Moldavia, then part of the Russian Empire. Motivated by a rising tide of Russian state-sponsored antisemitism and terrorism (pogroms), Cohen immigrated to Ottoman Palestine in 1887. He settled in Rishon LeZion as part of the Hovevei Zion movement. Rishon LeZion was established in 1882, as a Jewish agricultural cooperative on barren land purchased from two brothers, Musa and Mustafa el Dagani. Cohen was also a member of B'nai B'rith.

In Rishon LeZion, Cohen married Minya Papirmeister and made his living as a vintner. Cohen was an accomplished local violinist. He was given the nickname “Stempenu”, after the famous fictional klezmer violinist in Shalom Aleichem's book of the same name. In 1938, when Cohen wrote his biography, he titled it Stempenu.

Cohen was one of the founders of the first Keren Kayemet in Rishon LeZion in 1889. It predated the later national Keren Kayemet Le Yisrael (Jewish National Fund for Israel).

Cohen returned to Ungheni where he established a girls school in the early years of the 20th century. The school was not successful. He returned to Rishon LeZion, reestablishing himself as a vintner and settling permanently to raise his only child, Ida. Cohen was active in early Jewish settlement efforts in Palestine. He helped found the city of Rehovot. The effort was unique in that it did not involve financial support from Baron Edmond James de Rothschild. Philosophically, he joined with others working for the Redemption of the Ancient Land of Israel.

Hatikvah instrumental audio

Lyrics of the Israeli National Anthem

== Hatikvah ==
Naftali Herz Imber's poem "Tikvatenu" (Our Hope), published in 1886, stirred Jews everywhere, especially those who lived under antisemitic oppression. Cohen's brother had immigrated to Ottoman Palestine, settling in c. 1883 in Yesud HaMa'ala, the first modern Jewish community and moshava in the Hula Valley. He sent a copy of Imber's poem to Cohen in Moldavia.

Imber lived in Palestine for six years, where his poem was greeted with enthusiasm by the farmers of the Jewish settlements. Cohen set the poem to music, based on a Moldavian/Romanian folk-song, "Carul cu boi" ("The Ox Cart"). The catalyst of Cohen's musical adaptation facilitated the enthusiastic spread of Imber's poem throughout the Zionist communities of Palestine. Within a few years, it spread globally to pro-Zionist communities and organizations, becoming the unofficial Zionist anthem. In 1933, at the 18th Zionist Congress in Prague, it was formally adopted and renamed "Hatikvah".

The Hatikvah widely permeated Jewish popular culture, promoted by famous singers such as the American Al Jolson.

Hatikvah was sung even outside the gas chambers. The British military made the most famous recording of the Hatikvah, when it was sung by survivors of the Bergen Belsen Concentration Camp. The Holocaust survivors onboard the famed American rescue ship, the SS Exodus, sang the Hatikvah as it pulled into the port of Haifa. The British arrested the Holocaust survivors and returned them to Germany for reinternment in DP camps.

British Mandate authorities banned the singing or musical broadcasting of Hatikvah, as it was considered provocative. A similar piece, Smetana's The Moldau, with its musical refrains reminiscent of Cohen's Hatikvah composition, was substituted for broadcast media by Zionist communities in Palestine. May 14, 1948, Hatikvah was played at the conclusion of the Israeli Declaration of Independence ceremony. November 2004, Imber-Cohen's Hatikvah was formally adopted through Israel's Flag, Coat-of-Arms, and National Anthem Law.

== Death ==
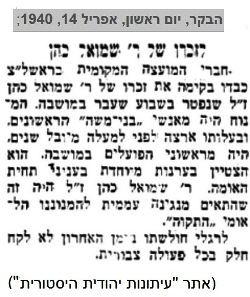
In Memory of Reb. Shmuel Cohen, from Haboker (the Morning) news

Cohen died on March 28, 1940. He was buried in the (Old) Rishon LeZion Cemetery. In 2020, after years of neglect, the Jewish American Society for Historic Preservation restored Cohen's and his wife Mina's gravesites per agreement with Rishon LeZion to reflect the original historic interment style. A sculpture was added in the form of a flame with a Star of David emerging from the middle. A musical clef is welded to the star. The sculpture was created by Israeli sculptor Sam Philipe who constructed the flame from metal fragments of Qassem rockets fired into Israel from the Gaza Strip.

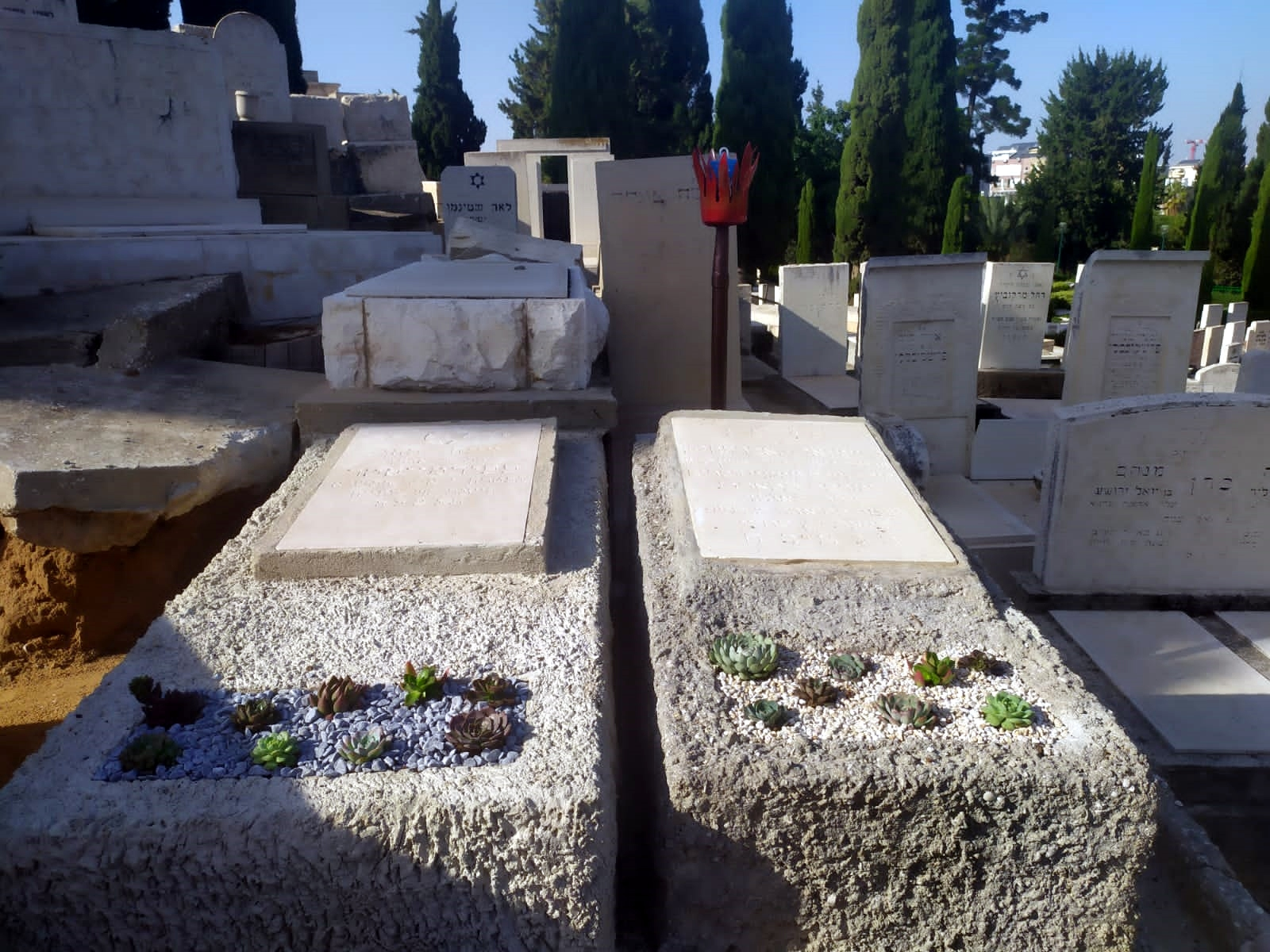
Gravesite of Shmuel Cohen and his wife after restoration by the Jewish American Society for Historic Preservation.
