= Aria del Gran Duca =

Renaissance ground bass

"Aria del Gran Duca" (also known as "Aria di Fiorenza") is a popular melody and ground bass originating in the concluding ballet of the sixth and final intermedio by Emilio de' Cavalieri to the play La pellegrina by Girolamo Bargagli. (Note: Details at Intermedii for La pellegrina) The occasion for this performance on 2 May 1589 were the festivities of Ferdinando I de' Medici's marriage to Christina of Lorraine.

It spread over Europe and was used as a basis of compositions by numerous other Renaissance composers, both anonymous and named, such as Santino Garsi da Parma, Peter Philips, Sweelinck, Gasparo Zanetti, Giuseppe Giamberti, and Adriano Banchieri. Francesca Caccini composed the song "O che nuovo stupor" as number 43 of her 1618 collection Il primo libro delle musiche using this ground bass.
