= Žofín Palace =

Cultural centre in Prague, Czechia

- Palác Žofín
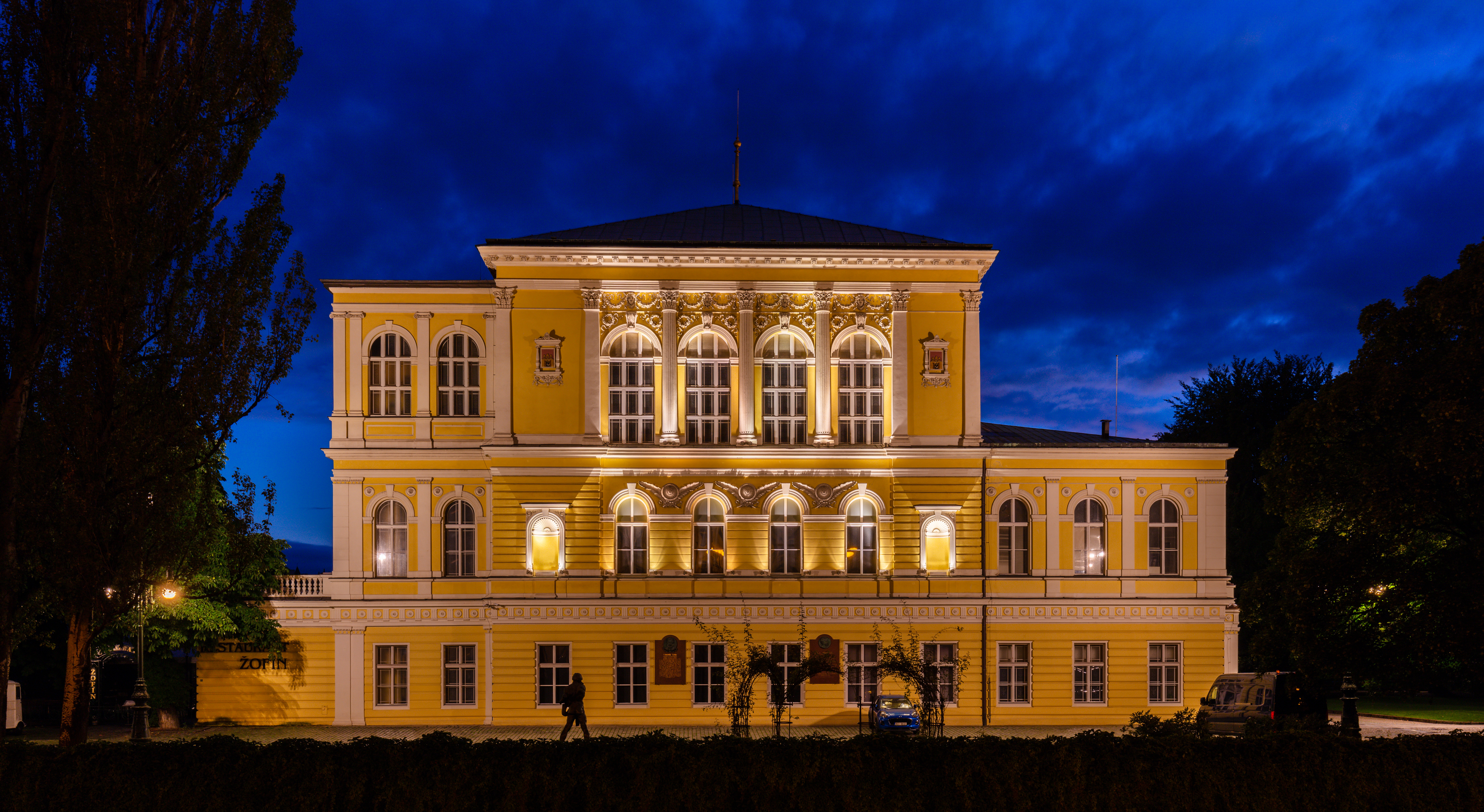
- Interactive map of the Žofín Palace area

General information
- Architectural style: Neo-Renaissance
- Location: Slavonic Island, Prague, Czech Republic
- Coordinates: 50°4′44″N 14°24′46″E
- Opened: 1837
- Renovated: 1884

Website
- https://www.zofin.cz/en/palac-zofin/

Žofín Palace (Czech pronunciation: [ˈʒofiːn]) is a Neo-Renaissance building in Prague, in the Czech Republic. It is a cultural centre, a venue for concerts, balls, conferences and exhibitions.

It is situated on Slovanský ostrov (Slavonic Island), an island in the Vltava river in New Town, Prague.

== History ==
The island in the Vltava river was formed in the 18th century. Damaged by floods in 1784, it was protected with a wall and planted with trees. In 1830, the island, then known as Barvířský ostrov (Dyer's Island), was bought by Václav Novotný, a miller. He created a Neo-Renaissance building here in 1836–1837; it was named after Princess Sophie (Žofie in Czech), mother of Austrian Emperor Franz Joseph I. The single-storey building had a concert hall and social hall, and was opened in 1837 with a ball.

The Prague Slavic Congress was held here in 1848. In 1925, to commemorate the event, the island was renamed Slovanský ostrov.

In 1884 the City of Prague bought the island, including the palace which was rebuilt as a two-storey building. The exterior and interior were renovated in 1991–1994.

Since 2005, it is the annual venue for Forum 2000.

== Musical performances ==
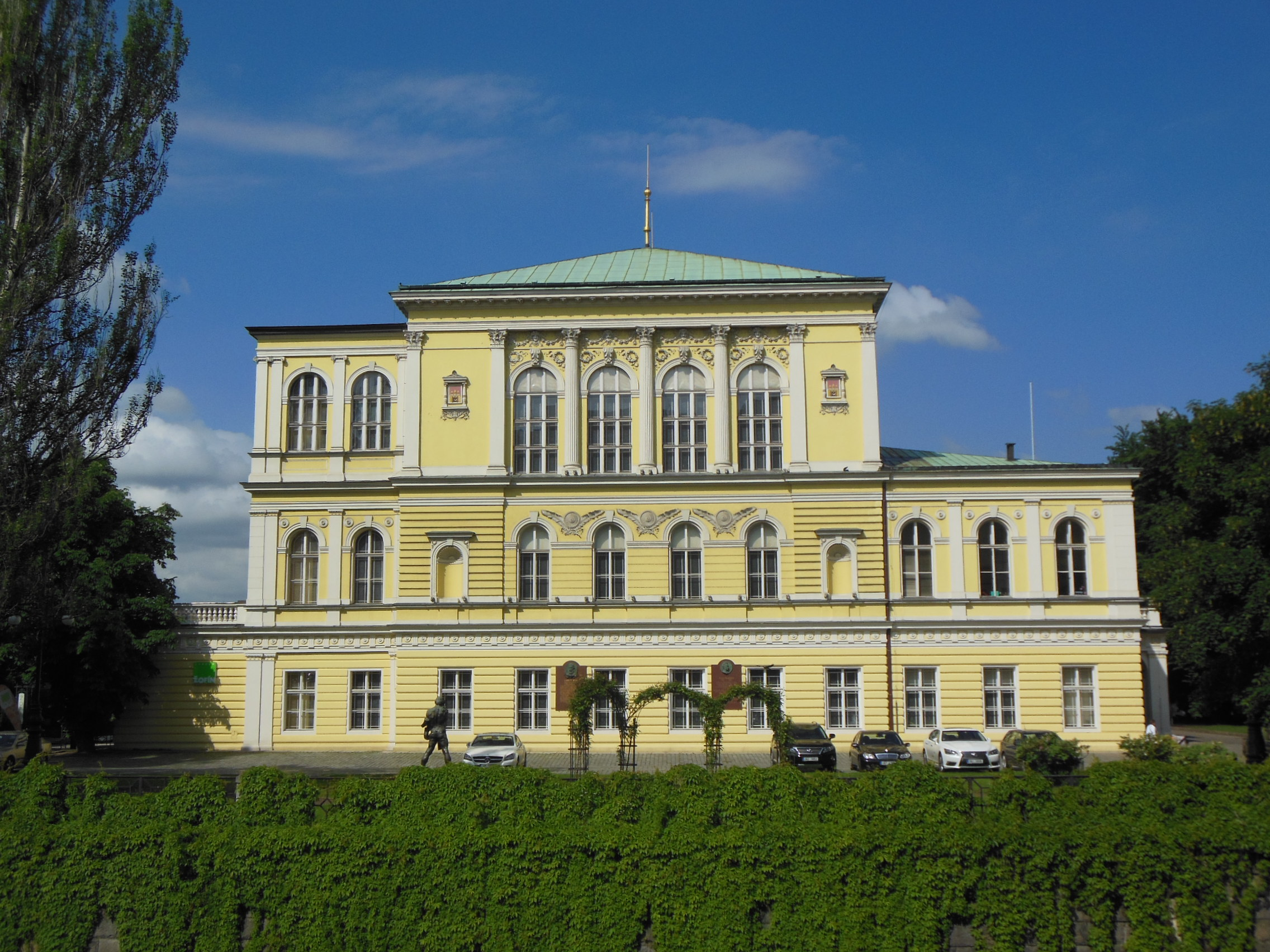
Daytime view

Antonín Dvořák held his first concert here in 1878. Berlioz, Liszt, Tchaikovsky and Wagner appeared in concerts in the palace. Má vlast, a set of six symphonic poems by Bedřich Smetana, was first performed in its entirety in Žofín Palace on 5 November 1882.
