= Camerata Academica of the Antipodes =

Australian baroque music group

- Origin: Sydney, New South Wales, Australia
- Genres: Baroque
- Years active: 2014–present
- Members: Imogen Coward; Leon Coward; Taliésin Coward
- Website: camerataantipodes.com.au

Camerata Academica of the Antipodes is an Australian chamber orchestra and vocal ensemble formed in 2014. It was founded by three Coward siblings, Imogen, Taliésin and Leon, who are all multi-instrumentalists and composers, together with various friends. Their main genre is the Baroque music of Vivaldi, Handel and Corelli but includes other eras and styles, and their own compositions.

== Background ==
The Coward siblings, Imogen, Taliésin and Leon were home-schooled by their parents up to university level. Their mother, Ann Coward, is of Greek-Australian descent and they attended St George Greek Orthodox Church, Rose Bay. Each sibling has completed a PhD in musicology.

Imogen (born 1986 or 1987), at 16 years-old, was studying for an external degree at the University of New England. Leon (born 1991) studied at the Julian Ashton Art School and at the University of New England, and graduated with a first class honours Bachelor of Arts degree in 2013. He completed his PhD study in 2017, writing his dissertation on creating a new method for analysing film design. He used that method in the development of the film, 2BR02B: To Be or Naught To Be (2016). Since 2017 Leon has been a judge for the Sydney Indie Film Festival. At the age of 14 Leon promoted good reading for children and asked a local book store if he could organise events on their premises. Between 2005 and 2008, he organised visits by Australian children's authors to that book store. He met Libby Hathorn through these events, and later illustrated her book Vietnam Reflections (2010). It was a presentation gift to the Australian War Memorial and won the 2010 Poetry Prize at the Inaugural Woollahra Library Word Festival.

== Formation ==
Academica of the Antipodes were founded by the Coward siblings with fellow musicologists and multi-instrumentalists in 2014 in Sydney. Imogen is the director of the orchestra and has focussed on violin, viola, cello and vocals, Taliésin mainly delivers violin, vocals and guitar, while Leon provides violin, viola, piano and baritone bass vocals. Their first performance was on 31 August 2014 at St. Alban's Church Hall, Epping. The concert raised funds for Australian Children's Music Foundation (see Don Spencer) and Brissenden Foundation. Internationally the ensemble established their "distinctly recognisable culture and ethos" of the "performer as co-creator."

== Compositions ==
Coward first premiered selections from his music for Alice's Adventures in Wonderland at the Tate Liverpool's major exhibition Alice in Wonderland (November 2011 - January 2012) which celebrated the 150th anniversary of Carroll's book, and later premiered "Beautiful Soup" in Sydney, which scholar Timothy Harries described as "logical, as though it was 'always meant to exist'."

Coward has written music for piano, strings, and voice, and performs his own piano works. His compositions have been positively received by Australian and international audiences, and regularly critiqued in the British Society for Eighteenth-Century Studies publication Criticks. Esther Lie described his work as "full of new invention," leading audiences "into a world full of colour." His compositional style has been frequently described as "Chopin-esque," "Neo-Romantic", and exhibiting "a love of nineteenth-century music." Coward frequently engages audiences' imaginations before performing, such as describing ballet sequences for '"Two Kings" suite and "Imaginary Pas De Deux".

=== Original works ===
- "Beautiful Soup" (lyrics from Alice's Adventures in Wonderland by Lewis Carroll) - Piano & String Orchestra (2014), later re-arranged with Vocal Ensemble (2017)
- "Sans Souci" - Piano (2017)
- "Melody" - Piano & String Orchestra (2016)
- "Lament" - Piano (2015)
- "Imaginary Pas de Deux" - Piano (2015)
- "Trio" - 2 Violins & Piano (2013)
- "Consolation" - Piano (2013)
- "Nocturne" - Piano (2013)
- "The Embrace" - Piano (2012)

=== Arrangements ===
- Giuseppe Cenci. "La Mantovana" arranged for String Orchestra (2017)
- Arthur Sullivan. "Glee" from The Mikado arranged for String Orchestra (2014)
- Wolfgang Amadeus Mozart. "Lacrimosa" from Requiem in D minor, K.626 arranged for Solo Piano (2013)

=== Film scores ===
- 2BR02B: To Be or Naught To Be (2016)

== Books ==
- Vietnam Reflections written by Libby Hathorn, illustrated by Leon Coward (Sydney: Pax Press, 2010)

== Awards ==
Sydney Indie Film Festival (Sydney, Australia)

- (2016) Won—Best Sci-Fi Short / 2BR02B: To Be or Naught To Be

WILDsound Fest (Toronto, Canada)

- (2017) Won—Best Film / 2BR02B: To Be or Naught To Be

KaPow Intergalactic Film Festival (California, USA)

- (2016) Won—Best Sci-Fi Short / 2BR02B: To Be or Naught To Be

The Montreal International Wreath Awards Film Festival (Montreal, Canada)

- (2016) Nominated—Best Picture / 2BR02B: To Be or Naught To Be

The Golden Blasters Science Fiction Short Film Awards (The National Irish Science Fiction Film Festival) (Dublin, Ireland)

- (2016) Nominated—Best Film / 2BR02B: To Be or Naught To Be

Fantastic Planet Film Festival (Sydney Australia)

- (2016) Nominated—Best Film / 2BR02B: To Be or Naught To Be

Miami Short Film Festival (Miami, USA)

- (2016) Semi-Finalist / 2BR02B: To Be or Naught To Be

Best Short Fest (San Diego, USA)

- (2016) Semi-Finalist / 2BR02B: To Be or Naught To Be
