= Forum 2000 =

Logo

Forum 2000 is a foundation and conference of the same name held in Prague, Czech Republic. The Forum 2000 Foundation was founded in 1996 as a joint initiative of the Czech President Václav Havel, Japanese philanthropist Yohei Sasakawa, and Nobel Peace Prize laureate Elie Wiesel. Mr. Havel based his idea for Forum 2000 on the principle that, “it would be good if intelligent people, not only from the various ends of the earth, different continents, different cultures, from civilization's religious circles, but also from different disciplines of human knowledge could come together somewhere in calm discussion.”

The main objective of the Forum 2000 conferences is “to identify the key issues facing civilization and to explore ways to prevent the escalation of conflicts that have religion, culture or ethnicity as their primary components.” Forum 2000 aims to provide a platform to discuss these important topics openly and to enhance global dialogue. Through its activities, the Forum 2000 Foundation also intends to promote democracy in non-democratic countries and to support the civil society, respect for human rights and religious, cultural and ethnic tolerance in young democracies.

== Forum 2000 Annual Conferences ==
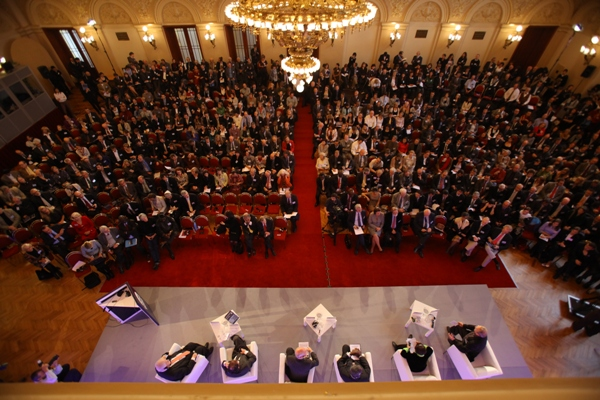
Forum 2000 in Žofín Palace (2011)

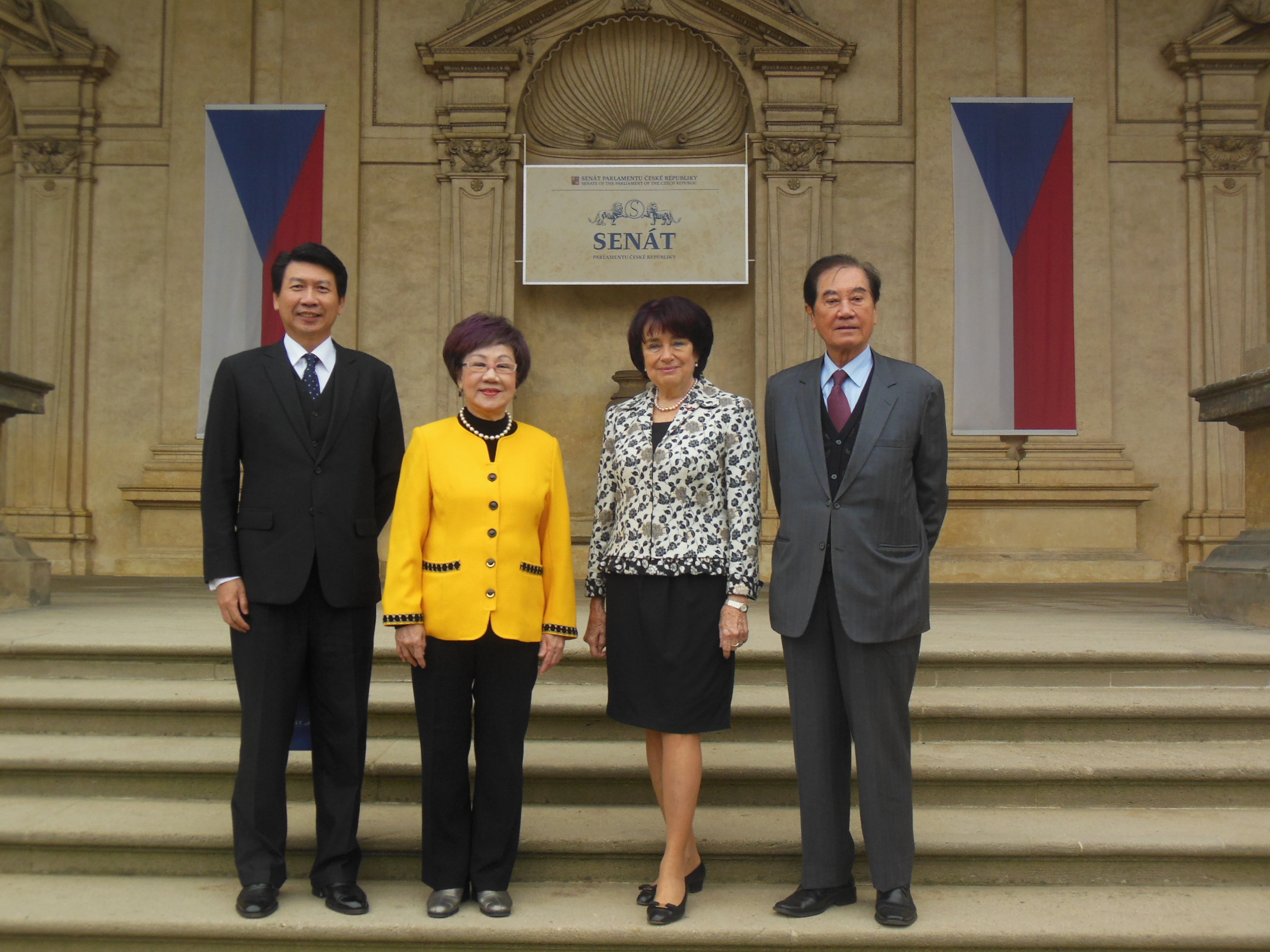
Joey Wang, Annette Lu, Eva Syková and Mark Chen during the 2016 conference

The annual Forum 2000 Conference, along with other events organized by the Forum 2000 Foundation, are held in Prague. The mission of these conferences is to “map the globalization process and to note its positive results as well as the perils encountered by an increasingly interconnected world.” Since 1997, the Forum 2000 Conferences have attracted a number of prominent thought leaders, Nobel laureates, former and acting politicians, business leaders and other individuals, whose common denominative is experience with bearing responsibility. Prince Hassan bin Talal, Frederik Willem de Klerk, Bill Clinton, Nicholas Winton, Oscar Arias Sánchez, Dalai Lama, Hans Küng, Shimon Peres, Madeleine Albright, Mário Soares, Hanna Suchocká, Sergey Kovalyov, Jorge Castaneda, Alaksandar Milinkievič, Wole Soyinka, Aung San Suu Kyi, Luisa Neubauer, Maia Sandu, Danuše Nerudová, Tsai Ing-wen, Iveta Radičová, Elmar Brok, Michael McFaul, Walter Russell Mead, Penpa Tsering, Petr Pavel, Vladimir Kara-Murza and Lech Wałęsa are just a few of those who have attended the Forum 2000 events.

Video recordings of the conference discussions and Conference Reports are available on the Forum 2000 website (www.forum2000.cz), as well as photo-galleries, transcripts, summaries and other information from each of the annual conferences. The conferences generally open with a speech by former President Havel and then host a series of panels that discuss topics relating to the conference theme, business and the economy, interfaith dialogue, or specific regional issues.

=== List of Previous Conferences ===
- 1997: "Concerns and Hopes on the Threshold of the New Millenium", September 4–6, Prague Castle
- 1998: "Globalization-Experiences, Instruments, Procedures", October 12–14, Prague Castle
- 1999: "Process of World Integration-Alternative Visions", October 11–13, Prague Castle
- 2000: "Education, Culture and Spiritual Values in the Age of Globalisation", October 15–18, Prague Castle
- 2001: "Human Rights-Search for Global Responsibility", October 14–17, Prague Castle
- 2002: "Searching for Global Consensus", October 18–20, Prague Castle
- 2003: "Bridging Global Gaps", October 15–17, Municipal House, Prague Castle
- 2004: "Civil Society in a Globalized World", October 17–19, Municipal House, Prague Castle
- 2005: "Our Global Co-Existence: Challenges and Hopes for the 21st Century", October 9–10, Žofín Palace
- 2006: "The Dilemmas of Global Coexistence", October 8–10, Žofín Palace
- 2007: "Freedom and Responsibility", October 7–9, Žofín Palace
- 2008: "Openness and Fundamentalism in the 21st Century", October 12–14, Žofín Palace
- 2009: "Democracy and Freedom in a Multipolar World", October 11–13, Žofín Palace
- 2010: "The World We Want to Live In", October 10–12, Žofín Palace
- 2011: "Democracy and the Rule of Law", October 9–11, Žofín Palace
- 2012: "Media and Democracy", October 21–23, Žofín Palace
- 2013: "Societies in Transitions", September 15–17, Žofín Palace
- 2014: "Democracy and its Discontents", September 12–15, Žofín Palace
- 2015: "Democracy and Education", September 13–16, Žofín Palace
- 2016: "The Courage to Take Responsibility", October 16–19, Žofín Palace
- 2017: "Strengthening Democracy in Uncertain Times", October 8–10, Žofín Palace
- 2018: "Democracy: In Need of a Critical Update?", October 7–9, Žofín Palace
- 2019: "Recovering the Promise of 1989", October 13–15, Žofín Palace
- 2020: "A New World Emerging? Restoring Responsibility and Solidarity", October 11–13, online (due to COVID-19 pandemic)
- 2021: "What Now? Building Back Democratically", October 10–12
- 2022: "Democracy's Clear and Present Danger: How Do We Respond?", August 31–September 2
- 2023: "For A Democratic World Order", October 15–17, Prague Congress Centre
- 2024: "Proving Democracy's Resolve and Resilience", October 13–15, Prague Congress Centre

== Projects ==
- Hiroshima-Nagasaki 1945-2010 – This exhibition commemorates the 65th anniversary of the bombing of Hiroshima and Nagasaki on August 6 and 9, 1945.The exhibition, which recounts the story of the dropping of the bombs and the subsequent renewal of the two cities, was held both in Prague's New Town Hall and the Moravian Museum in Brno from October 12 to November 14, 2010.
- NGO Market – Held annually since 2000, this event is the biggest gathering of non-governmental organizations in the Czech Republic. NGOs active in education, volunteering, human rights, environmental and other issues are given an opportunity to present their activities to the broad public, establish new partnerships, address potential sponsors and volunteers, and gain valuable know-how needed for successful NGO-management. The 2010 NGO market took place on April 16, and was attended by nearly 150 NGOs from countries throughout Europe.
- Shared Concern Initiative – The Shared Concern Initiative (SCI) was conceived in 2005 by the Dalai Lama in cooperation with Václav Havel, El Hassan bin Talal and Frederik W. de Klerk. The SCI is an open and informal group of recognized personalities representing various cultures, historical backgrounds, religions, and traditions. The SCI endeavors to “address the important challenges of today's world with the understanding that changes towards the better can be effectively promoted with a common voice.” It has recently issued joint statement appeals on human rights abuses in Burma, Russia and China.
- Exploring Water Patterns in the Middle East – This project addresses a problem that is key to the Middle East's development—namely, water resources. Water has become a subject of international relations with significant security, economic, social and humanitarian implications. As a result, the project intends to help facilitate a peaceful and sustainable resolution of tensions over freshwater resources in the Middle East by collecting and exchanging know-how, experience and opinions among all stakeholders in order to create a situation of common understanding where a plan for concerted action becomes possible.
- Interfaith Dialogue – The Interfaith Project is a platform where representatives of Christianity, Judaism, Islam, Buddhism, Hinduism and other religions can discuss up-to-date issues regarding interreligious relations. Through frank dialogue at the Forum 2000 conferences, participants work towards a better collective understanding of global issues, explore the role of religion today and search for ways to increase mutual cooperation and understanding.
- Educational Programs - The main aim of the long term educational programs is to strengthen democracy and civil society in the Balkans, Central Asia, Central & Eastern Europe and the Caucasus, which are still in the process of transforming into democracies. The program strives to aid them in stabilizing, diversifying, and professionalizing their political systems. Training courses for youths in these regions include Youth in Conflicts – Training on Conflict Management and Active Participation, Youth Leadership Training, and the Long Term Training Course.
- Conferences and Roundtables - The Forum 2000 Foundation also holds various conferences and roundtables outside of the primary annual conference event. In April 2010, Forum 2000 held an international conference entitled “Forgotten Victims” in cooperation with the Remembrance, Responsibility and Future Foundation. This conference dealt with “the situation of victims of hate crime/hate violence and victim assistance in the Czech Republic.” The goal of the conference was to contribute to a useful exchange of experiences on how to effectively and consistently address the issue of the hate violence. Other recent conferences include a “Workshop on EU – Central America Relations” in February 2010 and a conference entitled “Freedom and its Adversaries” in November 2009.
- Other Activities - On March 31, 2010, the Forum 2000 and many former delegates of its conferences demanded the release of Dr. Oswaldo Álvarez Paz in an open letter addressed to the Venezuelan government. Álvarez Paz, a former Forum 2000 participant himself, was arrested on March 22 by the Venezuelan government for comments he made on a television show. As a result of this letter and pressure by other human rights organizations, Álvarez Paz was released in May and all charges against him were dropped.
