= 2BR02B: To Be or Naught to Be =

- Theatrical release poster
- Directed by: Marco Checa Garcia
- Screenplay by: Derek Ryan
- Based on: 2 B R 0 2 B by Kurt Vonnegut
- Produced by: Artin John; Derek Ryan
- Cinematography: Christopher Banting
- Edited by: Leon Coward; James Tarbotton; Mitchell Politeski
- Music by: Leon Coward
- Release date: 24 April 2016 (Sci-Fi-London)
- Running time: 18 minutes
- Countries: Canada; Australia; United Kingdom; Mexico; Netherlands
- Language: English

2BR02B: To Be or Naught to Be is a 2016 Canadian short science fiction film directed by Marco Checa Garcia and based on the 1962 short story "2 B R 0 2 B" by Kurt Vonnegut. The film was an international collaboration over nearly three years, with additional crew in Sydney, London, Mexico, and the Netherlands. The film features a cameo voice role by veteran actor and The X-Files star William B. Davis. The film's sound was designed by BAFTA-winner Martin Cantwell.

== Premise ==
In 2204, the Earth has become a dystopian wasteland. To maintain strict population levels, no newborn is permitted to live unless another person's life is traded in, and a receipt issued. Edward K. Wehling, Jr. sits in Chicago's Lying-In Hospital waiting for the birth of his triplets, but he has no receipts to collect them.

== Cast ==
- Mackenzie Gray as Dr. Hitz
- Tyler Johnston as Edward K. Wehling, Jr.
- Jason Diablo as the Painter
- Melissa Roxburgh as Leora Duncan
- Artin John as the Orderly
- William B. Davis as the voice of Granddad

== Production ==
An IndieGoGo crowdfunding campaign was announced in a press release on 20 November 2013. Shortly after, it was announced that actor Paul Giamatti was attached to the project as the character Dr. Hitz. Actor Mackenzie Gray took the role of Dr. Hitz after Giamatti left due to scheduling conflicts.

The film's visual design was prepared by artists working from Vancouver, Sydney, and the Netherlands. Filming took place over three days at the Waterfall Building in Canada. Visual effects were mostly done by Facet School of VFX, Mexico. The film was edited in Vancouver, but its picture lock was undone and post-production was moved to Sydney for editing, additional visual effects and music. Sound designer Martin Cantwell joined the project, working from London.

== Music ==
The film's soundtrack makes extensive use of Schubert's Ave Maria in a version recorded especially for the film by Australian soprano and conductor Dr. Imogen Coward.

== Release ==
The film premiered at the Sci-Fi-London festival on 29 April 2016, and later in Los Angeles at the Oscar-qualifying HollyShorts Film Festival. Shortly after, the film was selected for the Oscar-qualifying LA Shorts Fest.

=== Reception ===
2BR02B: To Be or Naught to Be received positive reviews from critics, festival organizers and festival audiences. Daniel Abella, director of the New York Science Fiction Festival, called it one of the six must-see films of the festival and Outer Place critic Chris Mahon described it as "well-executed and beautifully shot." WILDsound Fest's official full-length review of the film by Kierston Drier described it as "one of those rare gems of short cinema that will set your philosophical mind in motion... There is a level of polish and richness that any lover of science fiction and literature will appreciate and admire." Screenwriter and Motherboard contributor Michael L. Piel praised how the adaptation "unfolds like a finely-tuned play, revealing world and character details at a steady, controlled pace." John Vaughan, director of The Golden Blasters (The National Irish Science Fiction Film Festival) described the film as "An unconventional short film... it captures the sense of unease that would come if you glimpsed this particular future." Dumbbells & Dragons critic Rachel Bohlen rated the film as her third favourite from the HollyShorts Film Festival (Los Angeles), describing the film as a "terrifying view of our future" and that the adaptation "adheres almost completely to the short story, and I must warn you – there's no happy ending here. It's bleak but thought-provoking." Lund International Film Festival's Jimmy Seiersen described the film as "suspenseful and thoughtful."

Both the film's art direction and soundtrack have also received critical praise. CEO of WILDsound Fest, Matthew Toffolo and the festival's audience praised Leon Coward's interpretation of The Happy Garden of Life mural into a complex, story-rich work of art, concluding that "from a cinematic point of view... they did nail it." In an essay/interview published in The Schubertian (Journal of the Schubert Institute UK), Anna Black described the soundtrack's use of Schubert's Ave Maria as "a lasting and haunting shred of beauty and humanity in a future where it has otherwise been abandoned."

== Festival selections, awards, and nominations ==
Year	Festival	City	Nomination	Result
2016	Sci-Fi-London (International Festival of Science Fiction and Fantastic Film)	London, UK		
2016	HollyShorts Film Festival	Los Angeles, California USA		
2016	LA Shorts Fest (Los Angeles International Short Film Festival)	Los Angeles, California USA		
2016	Miami Short Film Festival	Miami, Florida USA	Best Film	Nominated
2016	Best Short Fest	San Diego, California USA	Best Film	Nominated
2016	Sydney Indie Film Festival	Sydney, Australia	Best Sci-Fi Short	Won
2016	Sydney Indie Film Festival	Sydney, Australia	Best Short Screenplay (Derek Ryan)	Nominated
2016	KaPow Intergalactic Film Festival	Corona, California USA	Best Sci-Fi Short	Won
2016	Indie Fest USA International	Garden Grove, California USA		
2016	Silicon Valley International Film Festival	California USA		
2016	The Golden Blasters Science Fiction Short Film Awards (The National Irish Science Fiction Film Festival)	Dublin, Ireland	Best Film	Nominated
2016	YES! Let's Make a Movie Film Festival	Montreal, Canada		
2016	The Montreal International Wreath Awards Film Festival	Montreal, Canada	Best Picture	Nominated
2016	The Montreal International Wreath Awards Film Festival	Montreal, Canada	Best Director (Marco Checa Garcia)	Nominated
2016	The Montreal International Wreath Awards Film Festival	Montreal, Canada	Best Actor (Tyler Johnston)	Won
2016	Fantastic Planet (Horror, Sci-Fi & Fantasy Film Festival)	Sydney, Australia	Best Film	Nominated
2017	New York Science Fiction Film Festival	New York USA		
2017	Vancouver Short Film Festival	Vancouver, Canada		
2017	WILDsound Fest	Toronto, Canada	Best Film	Won
2017	Boston Science Fiction Film Festival	Boston, Massachusetts USA		
2017	The Philip K. Dick Film Festival	New York USA		
2017	Lund International Fantastic Film Festival	Lund, Sweden		
2017	Signes de Nuit	Lisbon, Portugal		
2017	Eerie Horror Film Festival	Pennsylvania USA		
2017	Buffalo Dreams Film Festival	Buffalo USA		
2017	Utopiales	Nantes, France		
2017	VonnegutFest	Indianapolis USA		
2017	Canada Shorts Film Festival	Canada	Best Picture	Nominated
2017	Bucharest ShortCut Cinefest	Bucharest, Romania		
2018	Miami International Sci-Fi Film Festival	Miami, Florida USA		
2018	Dam Short Film Festival	Boulder City, Nevada USA		
2018	Love Your Shorts Film Festival	Sanford, Florida USA		
2018	Top Shorts	Online Film Festival (February), Los Angeles, California USA	Best Sci-Fi	Won
2018	Top Shorts	Online Film Festival (February), Los Angeles, California USA	Best Director (Marco Checa Garcia)	Won
2018	Top Shorts	Online Film Festival (February), Los Angeles, California USA	Best Actor (Tyler Johnston)	Won
2018	Festigious International Film Festival	Online Film Festival (February), Los Angeles, California USA	Best Picture	Won
2018	Festigious International Film Festival	Online Film Festival (February), Los Angeles, California USA	Best Sci-Fi	Won
2018	Festigious International Film Festival	Online Film Festival (February), Los Angeles, California USA	Best Actor (Mackenzie Gray)	Won
2018	The Monthly Film Festival	Online Film Festival (February)	Cinematographer of the Month (Chris Banting)	Nominated
2018	Los Angeles Film Awards	Los Angeles, California USA	Best Sci-Fi	Won

The film screened at VonnegutFest in November 2017 at the Kurt Vonnegut Museum and Library, Indianapolis.

The film screened, accompanied by a talk "Vonnegut's 2BR02B on screen: the art and music of the 2016 adaptation (dir. Marco Checa Garcia)", at the joint NZMS (New Zealand Musicological Society) & MSA (Musicological Society of Australia) conference in Auckland, December 2017.
