= Hatikvah =

National anthem of Israel

Hatikvah "The Hope"
- הַתִּקְוָה
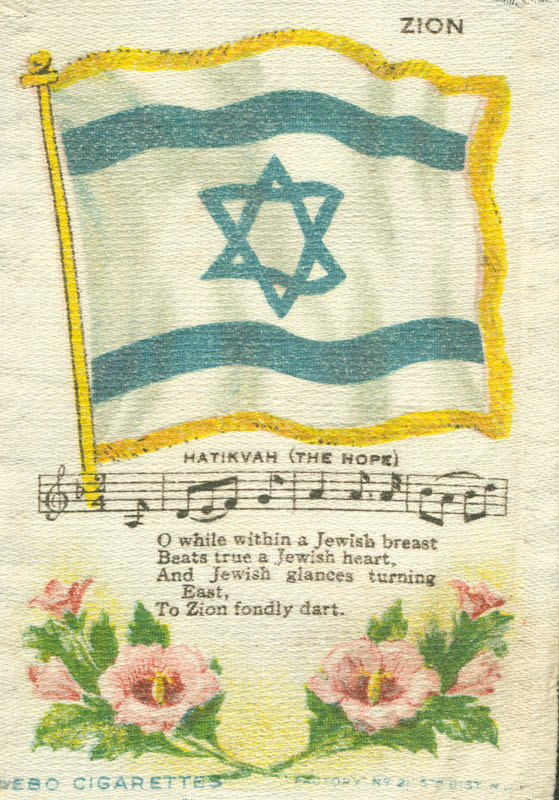
- Poem lyrics below an Israeli flag
- National anthem of Israel
- Lyrics: Naftali Herz Imber, 1877
- Music: Shmuel Cohen, 1887–1888
- Adopted: 2004 (used since 1948, decreed in 2018)

Audio sample
- Instrumental rendition by the United States Navy Band: file; help

"Hatikvah" (Hebrew: הַתִּקְוָה [hatikˈva]; lit. 'The Hope') is the national anthem of the State of Israel. A work of 19th-century Zionist Jewish poetry, the romantic composition expresses the desire of Jews in diaspora to return to the Land of Israel in order to establish a Jewish nation-state there. The piece's lyrics are adapted from a work by Naftali Herz Imber, a Jewish poet from Złoczów, Austrian Galicia. Imber wrote the first version of the poem in 1877, when he was hosted by a Jewish scholar in Iași.

== History ==
=== Text ===
The text of "Hatikvah" was written in 1878 by Naftali Herz Imber, a Jewish poet from Zolochiv, a city nicknamed "The City of Poets", then in Austrian Poland, today in Ukraine. His words "Lashuv le'eretz avotenu" (to return to the land of our forefathers) expressed its aspiration.

In 1882, Imber emigrated to Ottoman-ruled Palestine and read his poem to the pioneers of the early Jewish villages—Rishon LeZion, Rehovot, Gedera, and Yesud Hama'ala. In 1887, Shmuel Cohen, a very young (17 or 18 years old) resident of Rishon LeZion with a musical background, sang the poem by using a melody he knew from Romania and making it into a song, after witnessing the emotional responses of the Jewish farmers who had heard the poem. Cohen's musical adaptation served as a catalyst and facilitated the poem's rapid spread throughout the Zionist communities of Palestine.

Imber's nine-stanza poem, "Tikvatenu" (תִּקְוָתֵנוּ, "Our Hope"), put into words his thoughts and feelings following the establishment of Petah Tikva (literally "Opening of Hope"). Published in Jerusalem in Imber's first book Barkai ("Shining Morning Star") from 1886, it was subsequently adopted as an anthem by the Hovevei Zion and later by the Zionist Movement.

=== Before the founding of Israel ===
The Zionist Organization conducted two competitions for an anthem, the first in 1898 and the second, at the Fourth Zionist Congress, in 1900. The quality of the entries were all judged unsatisfactory and none was selected. Imber's "Tikvatenu", however, was popular, and a sessions at the Fifth Zionist Congress in Basel in 1901 concluded with the singing of the poem. During the Sixth Zionist Congress at Basel in 1903, the poem was sung by those opposed to accepting the proposal for a Jewish state in Uganda, their position in favor of the Jewish homeland in Palestine expressed in the line "An eye still gazes toward Zion".

1920 band and female vocal recording (two verses)
The first recording of "Hatikvah" (Hebrew: «הַתִּקְוָה»), performed by Hulda Lashanska

Although the poem was sung at subsequent congresses, it was only at the Eighteenth Zionist Congress in Prague in 1933 that a motion passed formally adopting "Hatikvah" as the anthem of the Zionist movement.

The British Mandate government briefly banned its public performance and broadcast from 1919, in response to an increase in Arab anti-Zionist political activity.

A former member of the Sonderkommando reported that the song was spontaneously sung by Czech Jews at the entrance to the Auschwitz-Birkenau gas chamber in 1944. While singing they were beaten by Waffen-SS guards.

=== Adoption as the Israeli national anthem ===
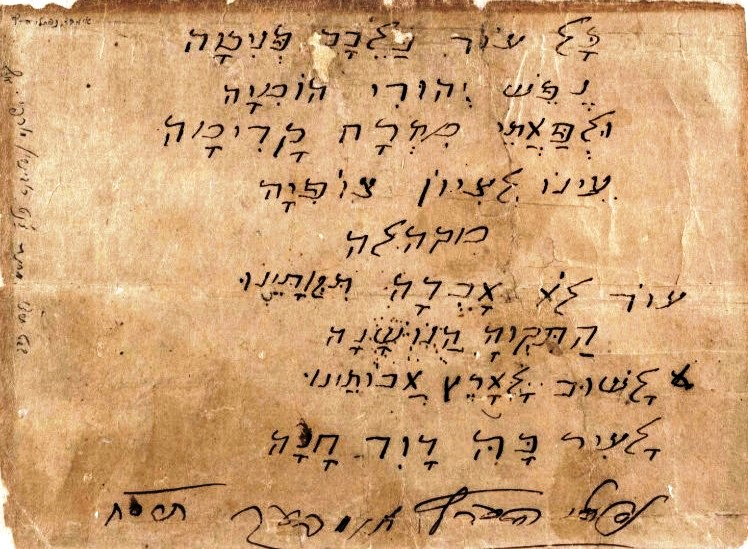
Imber's handwritten text of the poem

When the State of Israel was established in 1948, "Hatikvah" was unofficially proclaimed the national anthem. It did not officially become the national anthem until November 2004, when an abbreviated and edited version was sanctioned by the Knesset in an amendment to the Flag and Coat-of-Arms Law (now renamed the Flag, Coat-of-Arms, and National Anthem Law).

In its modern rendering, the official text of the anthem incorporates only the first stanza and refrain of the original poem. The predominant theme in the remaining stanzas is the establishment of a sovereign and free nation in the Land of Israel, a hope largely seen as fulfilled with the founding of the State of Israel.

=== Melody and its origins ===
The melody for "Hatikvah" is based on "La Mantovana", a 16th-century Italian song, composed by Giuseppe Cenci (Giuseppino del Biado) ca. 1600 with the text "Fuggi, fuggi, fuggi da questo cielo". Its earliest known appearance in print was in the del Biado's collection of madrigals. It was later known in early 17th-century Italy as "Ballo di Mantova". This melody gained wide currency in Renaissance Europe, under various titles, including the Polish "Pod Krakowem", Romanian "Cucuruz cu frunza-n sus", and the Ukrainian "Kateryna Kucheryava". It also served as a basis for Central European folk songs, such as the Slovenian children song "Čuk se je oženil". The best-known use of the melody prior to it becoming the Zionist anthem was by Czech composer Bedřich Smetana in his set of six symphonic poems celebrating Bohemia, Má vlast (My Homeland), namely in the second poem named after the river which flows through Prague, Vltava (also known as "The Moldau"). The melody was also used by the French composer Camille Saint-Saëns in Rhapsodie bretonne.

==== Zionist adaptation ====
The adaptation of the music for "Hatikvah" was set by Samuel Cohen in 1888. Cohen himself recalled many years later that he had hummed "Hatikvah" based on the melody from the song he had heard in Romania, "Carul cu boi" (the ox-driven cart).

The melody of "Hatikvah" follows a minor scale, which is often perceived as mournful in tone and is uncommon in national anthems. As the title "The Hope" and the words suggest, the import of the song is optimistic and the overall spirit uplifting.

=== Adaptations, renditions, and popular culture ===
Barbra Streisand performed "Hatikvah" in 1978 at a televised music special called The Stars Salute Israel at 30, a performance which included a conversation by telephone and video link with former Prime Minister Golda Meir.

American composer John Williams adapted "Hatikvah" in the 2005 historical drama film Munich.

American musician Anderson .Paak's 2016 release "Come Down" contains a sample of "Hatikvah" in English, attributed to producer Hi-Tek.

A 2018 rendition by Israeli Mizrahi singer Daniel Sa'adon with a Levantine dabke rhythm drew accusations of cultural appropriation, as well as concern due to the tune's popularity with Hamas. Sa'adon, who defended the arrangement as an effort to "show that the unity of cultures is possible through music", said he received praise from fellow musicians, including Arab Israelis.

On 25 May 2021, four days after the ceasefire that ended the 2021 Israel–Palestine crisis, Israeli singers Omer Adam and Noa Kirel released a pop remix of "Hatikvah" under the title "Hope". Produced by Scott Storch, it contains additional lyrics in English. It received mixed reviews, with some Israelis deeming it direspectful. Adam and Kirel donated their proceeds from the song to YAHAD United for Israel's Soldiers.

== Text ==
The official text of the Israeli national anthem corresponds to the first stanza and amended refrain of the original nine-stanza poem by Naftali Herz Imber. The original Hebrew is presented below alongside a transliteration and English translation.

=== Official Hebrew lyrics ===
Modern Hebrew original

כֹּל עוֹד בַּלֵּבָב פְּנִימָה
נֶפֶשׁ יְהוּדִי הוֹמִיָּה,
וּלְפַאֲתֵי מִזְרָח קָדִימָה,
עַיִן לְצִיּוֹן צוֹפִיָּה;

עוֹד לֹא אָבְדָה תִקְוָתֵנוּ,
הַתִּקְוָה בַּת שְׁנוֹת אַלְפַּיִם,
𝄇 לִהְיוֹת עַם חָפְשִׁי בְּאַרְצֵנוּ,
אֶרֶץ צִיּוֹן וִירוּשָׁלַיִם.𝄆

Transliteration

Kol ‘od balevav penimah
Néfesh Yehudi homiyah,
Ulfa’atey mizrach kadimah,
‘Áyin leTziyon tzofiyah;

‘Od lo avdah tikvaténu,
Hatikvah bat shnot ’alpáyim,
𝄆 Lihyot ‘am chofshi be’artzénu,
’Éretz Tziyon v'Yerushaláyim. 𝄇

IPA

/kol od ba.leˈvav pe.niˈma/
/ˈne.feʃ je.huˈdi ho.miˈja |/
/ul.fa.ʔa.tey miz.ʁaχ ka.di.ma |/
/ˈa.jin le.t͡si.jon t͡so.fi.ja |/

/od lo av.da tik.vaˈte.nu |/
/ha.tik.va bat ʃnot alˈpa.jim |/
𝄆 /lih.jot am χof.ʃi be.ʔaʁˈt͡se.nu |/
/ˈe.ʁet͡s t͡si.jon vi.ʁu.ʃaˈla.jim ‖/ 𝄇

=== English translation ===
Literal

As long as in the heart, within,
The Jewish soul yearns,
And towards the ends of the east,
[The Jewish] eye gazes toward Zion,

Our hope is not yet lost,
The hope of two thousand years,
𝄆 To be a free nation in our own land,
The land of Zion and Jerusalem. 𝄇

Poetic

O while within a Jewish breast,
Beats true a Jewish heart,
And Jewish glances turning East,
To Zion fondly dart;

O then our Hope—it is not dead,
Our ancient Hope and true,
𝄆 To be a nation free forevermore
Zion and Jerusalem at our core. 𝄇

=== Original lyrics ===
Modern Hebrew original

עוֹד לֹא אָבְדָה תִקְוָתֵנוּ
הַתִּקְוָה הַנּוֹשָׁנָה
לָשּׁוּב לָאָרֶץ אֲבוֹתֵינוּ
לְעִיר בָּהּ דָּוִד חָנָה.

כָּל עוֹד בִּלְבָבוֹ שָׁם פְּנִימָה
נֶפֶשׁ יְהוּדִי הוֹמִיָּה
𝄇 וּלְפַאֲתֵי מִזְרָח קָדִימָה
עֵינוֹ לְצִיּוֹן צוֹפִיָּה. 𝄆

כָּל עוֹד דְּמָעוֹת מֵעֵינֵינוּ
תֵּרֵדְנָה כְּגֶשֶׁם נְדָבוֹת
וּרְבָבוֹת מִבְּנֵי עַמֵּנוּ
עוֹד הוֹלְכִים לְקִבְרֵי־אָבוֹת.

כָּל עוֹד חוֹמַת־מַחֲמַדֵּינוּ
עוֹד לְעֵינֵינוּ מֵיפַעַת
𝄇 וַעֲלֵי חֻרְבַּן מִקְדָּשֵׁנוּ
עַיִן אַחַת עוֹד דּוֹמַעַת.𝄆

כָּל עוֹד הַיַּרְדֵּן בְּגָאוֹן
מְלֹא גְּדוֹתָיו יִזֹּלוּ
וּלְיָם כִּנֶּרֶת בְּשָׁאוֹן
בְּקוֹל הֲמֻלָּה יִפֹּלוּן.

כָּל עוֹד שָׁם עֲלֵי דְּרָכַיִם
שָׁם שַׁעַר יֻכַּת שְׁאִיָּה
𝄇 וּבֵין חָרְבוֹת יְרוּשָׁלַיִם
עוֹד בַּת־צִיּוֹן בּוֹכִיָּה.𝄆

כָּל עוֹד שָׁמָּה דְּמָעוֹת טְהוֹרוֹת
מֵעֵין־עַמִּי נוֹזֵלוֹת
לִבְכּוֹת לְצִיּוֹן בְּרֹאש אַשְׁמֻרֹות
יָקוּם בַּחֲצִי הַלֵּילוֹת.

כָּל עוֹד רֶגֶשׁ אַהֲבַת־הַלְּאֹם
בְּלֵב הַיְּהוּדִי פּוֹעֵם
𝄇 עוֹד נוּכַל קַוֵּה גַּם הַיּוֹם
כִּי יְרַחֲמֵנוּ אֵל זוֹעֵם.𝄆

שִׁמְעוּ אַחַי בְּאַרְצוֹת נוּדִי
אֶת קוֹל אַחַד חוֹזֵינוּ
𝄇 "כִּי רַק עִם אַחֲרוֹן הַיְּהוּדִי
גַּם אַחֲרִית תִּקְוָתֵנוּ".𝄆

Transliteration

‘Od lo ’avedah tikvaténu,
Hattikvah hannoshanah,
Lashuv la’áretz ’avotéinu;
Le‘ir bah david chanah.

Kol ‘od bilvavo sham penimah,
Néfesh Yehudi homiyyah,
𝄇 Ulefa’atei mizrach kadimah,
‘Eino letziyyon tzofiyyah. 𝄆

Kol ‘od dema‘ot me‘einéinu
Teredenah kegéshem nedavot
Urevavot mibbenei amménu
‘Od holechim lekivrei-’avot.

Kol ‘od chomat-machamaddéinu
‘Od le‘éineinu meifá‘at
𝄇 Va‘alei churban mikdashénu
‘Áyin ’achat ‘od domá‘at. 𝄆

Kol ‘od hayyarden bega’on
Melo gedotav yizzólu,
Uleyam Kinnéret besha‘on
Bekol hamullah yippolun.

Kol ‘od sham ‘alei deracháyim
Sham shá‘ar yukkat she’iyyah,
𝄇 Uvein charevot Yerushaláyim
‘Od bat-tziyyon bochiyyah. 𝄆

Kol ‘od shámmah dema‘ot tehorot
Me‘ein-‘ammi nozelot
Livkot letziyyon berosh ’ashmurovt
Yakum bachatzi halleilot.

Kol ‘od régesh ’ahavat-halle’om
Belev hayyehudi po‘em,
𝄇 ‘Od nuchal kavveh gam hayyom
Ki yerachaménu el zo‘em.𝄆

Shim‘u, ’achai be’artzot nudi,
’Et kol ’achad chozéinu
𝄇 "Ki rak ‘im ’acharon hayyehudi
Gam ’acharit tikvaténu." 𝄆

IPA

/od lo a.veˈda tik.vaˈtenu/
/hat.tikˈva han.no.ʃaˈna |/
/laˈʃuv laˈa.ʁet͡s avoˈtej.nu |/
/leˈiʁ ba daˈvid χaˈna |/

/kol od bilvaˈvo ʃam pe.niˈma |/
/ˈne.feʃ je.huˈdi ho.mijˈja |/
/u.le.fa.ʔaˈtej mizˈʁaχ ka.diˈma |/
/ejˈno le.t͡sijˈjon t͡so.fijˈja |/

/kol od de.maˈʔot me.ʔejˈnei.nu |/
/te.ʁe.deˈna keˈge.ʃem ne.daˈvot |/
/u.ʁe.vaˈvot mib.beˈnej amˈme.nu |/
/od ho.leˈχim le.kiv.ʁej.ʔaˈvot |

/kol od χo.mat.ma.χa.madˈdei.nu |/
/od leˈʔej.nej.nu mejˈfa.ʔat |/
/va.ʔaˈlej χuʁˈban mik.daˈʃe.nu |/
/ˈajin aˈχat od doˈma.ʔat |/

/kol od haj.jaʁˈden be.gaˈʔon |/
/meˈlo gedoˈtav jizˈzo.lu |/
/u.leˈjam kinˈne.ʁet be.ʃaˈʔon |/
/beˈkol ha.mulˈla jip.poˈlun |/

/kol od ʃam aˈlej de.ʁaˈχa.jim |/
/ʃam ˈʃa.ʔaʁ jukˈkat ʃe.ʔijˈja |/
/uˈvejn χa.ʁeˈvot je.ʁu.ʃaˈla.jim |/
/od bat.t͡sijˈjon bo.χijˈja |/

/kol od ˈʃam.ma de.maˈʔot te.hoˈʁot |/
/me.ʔejn.ʔamˈmi no.zeˈlot |/
/livˈkot le.t͡sijˈjon beˈʁoʃ ʔaʃ.muˈʁovt |/
/jaˈkum ba.χaˈt͡si hal.lejˈlot |/

/kol od ˈʁe.geʃ a.ha.vat.hal.leˈʔom |/
/beˈlev haj.je.huˈdi poˈʔem |/
/od nuˈχal kavˈveh gam hajˈjom |/
/ki je.ʁa.χaˈme.nu el zoˈʔem |/

/ʃimˈʔu, aˈχaj be.ʔaʁˈt͡sot nuˈdi, |/
/et kol aˈχad χoˈzej.nu |/
/ki ʁak im a.χaˈʁon haj.je.huˈdi |/
/gam a.χaˈʁit tik.vaˈte.nu ‖/

English translation

Our hope is not yet lost,
The ancient hope,
To return to the land of our fathers;
The city where David encamped.

As long as in his heart within,
A soul of a Jew still yearns,
𝄆 And onwards towards the ends of the east,
His eye still looks towards Zion. 𝄇

As long as tears from our eyes
Flow like benevolent rain,
And throngs of our countrymen
Still pay homage at the graves of our fathers.

As long as our precious Wall
Appears before our eyes,
𝄆 And over the destruction of our Temple
An eye still wells up with tears. 𝄇

As long as the waters of the Jordan
In fullness swell its banks,
And down to the Sea of Galilee
With tumultuous noise fall.

As long as on the barren highways
The humbled city-gates mark,
𝄆 And among the ruins of Jerusalem
A daughter of Zion still cries. 𝄇

As long as pure tears
Flow from the eye of a daughter of my nation
And to mourn for Zion at the watch of night
She still rises in the middle of the nights.

As long as the feeling of love of nation
Throbs in the heart of a Jew,
𝄆 We can still hope even today
That a wrathful God may have mercy on us. 𝄇

Hear, oh my brothers in the lands of exile,
The voice of one of our visionaries,
𝄆 [Who declares] that only with the very last Jew,
Only there is the end of our hope! 𝄇

=== Interpretation ===
1945 a cappella vocal recording
BBC recording from 20 April 1945 of Jewish survivors of the Bergen-Belsen concentration camp singing "Hatikvah", only five days after their liberation by Allied forces. The words sung are from the original poem by Imber.

Some people compare the first line of the refrain, "Our hope is not yet lost" ("עוד לא אבדה תקותנו"), to the opening of the Polish national anthem, "Poland Is Not Yet Lost" ("Jeszcze Polska nie zginęła") or the Ukrainian national anthem, "Ukraine Has Not Yet Perished" ("Ще не вмерла Україна; Šče ne vmerla Ukrajina"). This line may also be a Biblical allusion to Ezekiel's "Vision of the Dried Bones" (Ezekiel 37: "…Behold, they say, Our bones are dried, and our hope is lost (Hebrew:אבדה תקותנו)"), describing the despair of the Jewish people in exile, and God's promise to redeem them and lead them back to the Land of Israel.

The official text of "Hatikvah" is relatively short; indeed it is a single complex sentence, consisting of two clauses: the subordinate clause posits the condition ("As long as… A soul still yearns… And… An eye still watches…"), while the independent clause specifies the outcome ("Our hope is not yet lost… To be a free nation in our land").

== Objections and alternate proposals ==
=== By religious Jews ===
Some religious Jews have criticised "Hatikvah" for the song's lack of religious emphasis: there is no mention of God or the Torah in its lyrics.

Rabbi Abraham Isaac Kook wrote an alternative anthem titled "HaEmunah" ("The Faith") which he proposed as a replacement for "Hatikvah", while still endorsing the original anthem.

J. Simcha Cohen wrote that Dovid Lifshitz used "Lihyot am dati": "to be a religious nation [in our land]."

=== By non-Jewish Israelis ===
Some non-Jewish citizens of Israel, particularly Arab Israelis, object to "Hatikvah" because its lyrics focus exclusively on Jewish aspirations, making it difficult for them to identify with the anthem.

Several prominent non-Jewish public figures have declined to sing the anthem, including Druze minister Salah Tarif, Muslim minister Raleb Majadale, and Supreme Court justice Salim Joubran. Israeli footballers Bibars Natcho (a Muslim of Circassian descent) and Abbas Suan (a Muslim of Palestinian descent) have stood in silence for the anthem, doing so to respect the anthem whilst simultaneously refusing to sing it due to its focus on Jewish identity. Consequently, proposals have occasionally been raised to modify the anthem's lyrics to be more inclusive of non-Jewish Israelis.

== See also ==
- National symbols of Israel
- Culture of Israel
  - Music of Israel
