= Má vlast =

Set of symphonic poems composed by Bedřich Smetana

- Symphonic poems by Bedřich Smetana
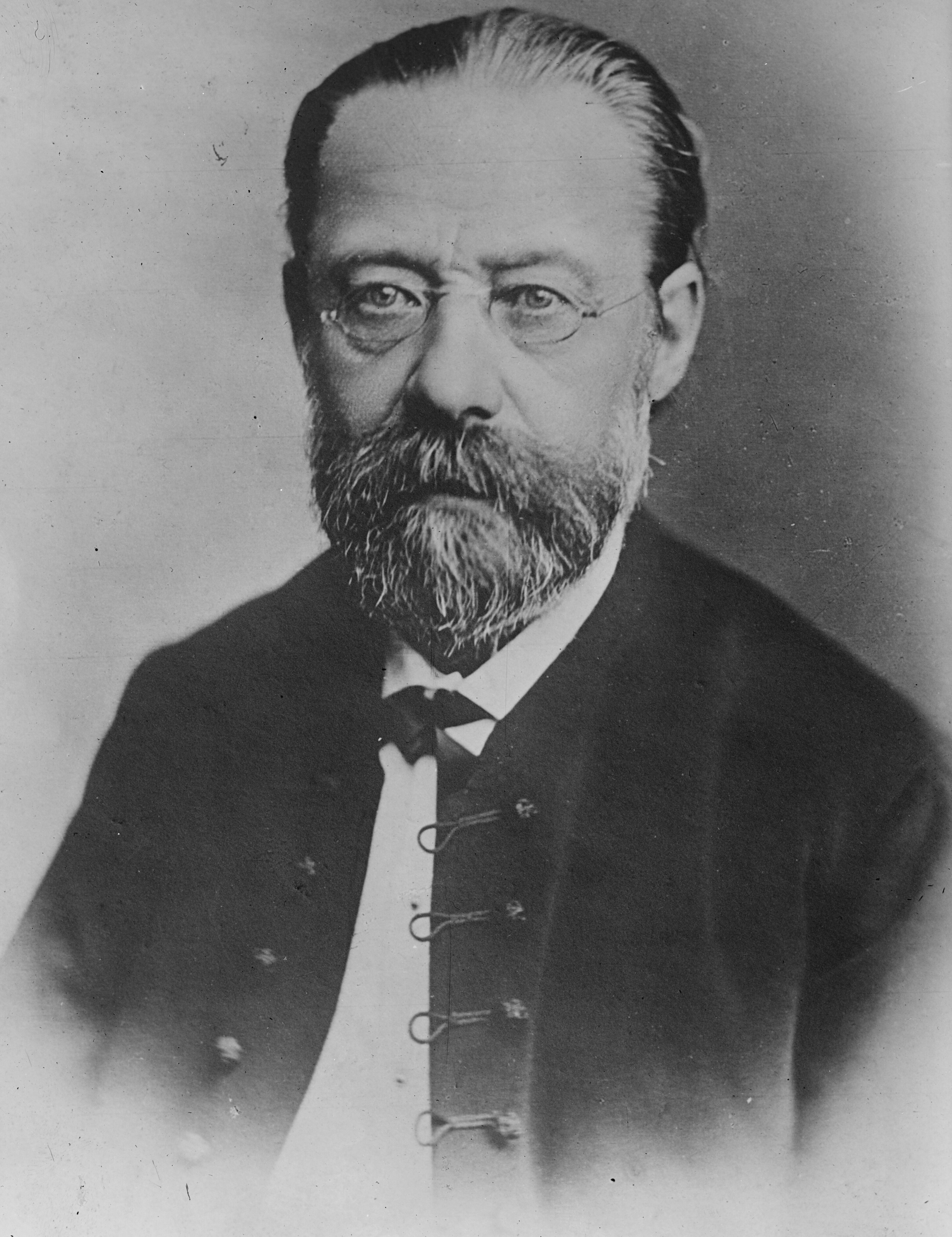
- Smetana, before 1880
- Period: Romantic
- Composed: 1874–1879
- Movements: 6

Premiere
- Date: 5 November 1882
- Location: Žofín Palace, Prague

Má vlast (Czech pronunciation: [maː vlast]), also known as My Fatherland, (Note: Though usually referred to as Má vlast, common translations include My Fatherland, My Country, and My Homeland.) is a set of six symphonic poems composed between 1874 and 1879 by the Czech composer Bedřich Smetana. The six pieces, conceived as individual works, are often presented and recorded as a single work in six movements. They premiered separately between 1875 and 1880. The complete set premiered on 5 November 1882 in Žofín Palace, Prague, under Adolf Čech.

Má vlast combines the symphonic poem form, pioneered by Franz Liszt, with the ideals of nationalistic music of the late nineteenth century. Each poem depicts an aspect of Bohemia's countryside, history, or legends.

The works have opened the Prague Spring International Music Festival, on the 12 May anniversary of the death of their composer, since 1952.

== Structure ==
Má vlast consists of six pieces:

1. Vyšehrad (The High Castle)
2. Vltava (The Moldau)
3. Šárka, named after a legendary female warrior
4. Z českých luhů a hájů (From Bohemia's Woods and Fields)
5. Tábor, a town in South Bohemia
6. Blaník, a mountain

=== 1. Vyšehrad ===
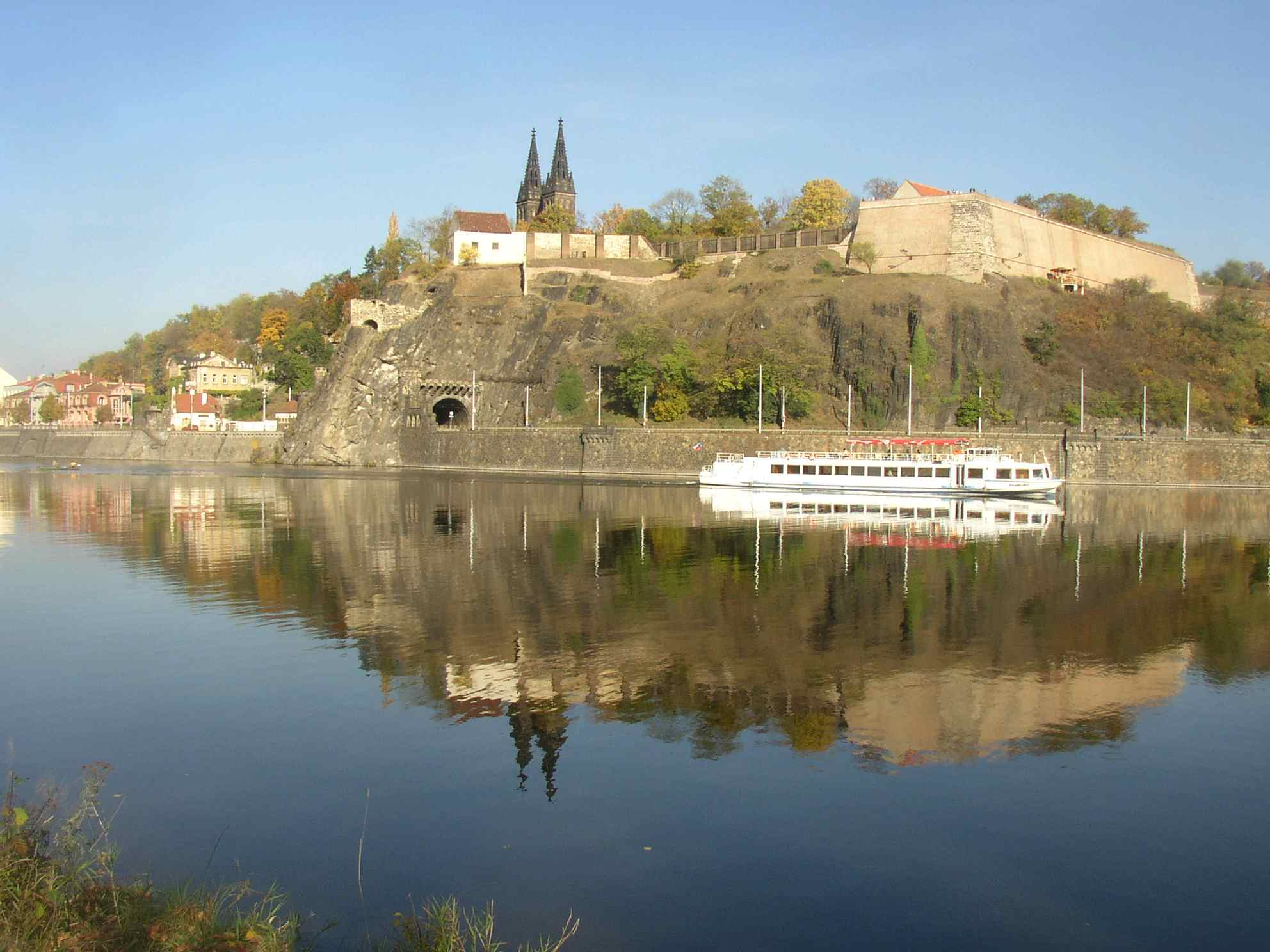
Vyšehrad above the Vltava River

The first poem, Vyšehrad (The High Castle), composed between the end of September and 18 November 1874 and premiered on 14 March 1875 at the [Prague] Philharmonic, describes the Vyšehrad castle in Prague which was the seat of the earliest Czech kings. During the summer of 1874, Smetana began to lose his hearing, and total deafness soon followed; he described the gradual, but rapid loss of his hearing in a letter of resignation to the director of the Royal Provincial Czech Theatre, Antonín Čížek. In July 1874 he began hearing anomalous noise and then a permanent buzzing. Not long after the onset he was unable to distinguish individual sounds. At the beginning of October he lost all hearing in his right ear, and finally on 20 October in his left. His treatment was based on maintaining isolation from all sounds, but was unsuccessful.

The poem begins with the sounds of the harp of the mythical singer Lumír, and then crosses over into the tones of the castle's arsenal. This section of the music introduces the main motifs, which are used in other parts of the cycle. A four note motif (B♭–E♭–D–B♭) represents the castle of Vyšehrad; this is heard again at the end of 'Vltava' and once more, to round the whole cycle off, at the conclusion of 'Blaník'.

In the score two harps are required to perform the opening arpeggios. After a dominant seventh chord, the winds take up the theme, followed by the strings, before the whole orchestra is employed to reach a climax. In the next part, Smetana recalls the story of the castle, using a faster tempo which becomes a march. A seemingly triumphant climax is cut short by a descending passage depicting the collapse of the castle, and the music falls quiet. Then the opening harp material is heard again and the music reminds again of the beauty of the castle, now in ruins. The music ends quietly, depicting the river Vltava flowing below the castle.

Conceived between 1872 and 1874, it is the only piece in the cycle to be mostly completed before Smetana began to go noticeably deaf in the summer of 1874. Most performances last about fifteen minutes.

=== 2. Vltava ===
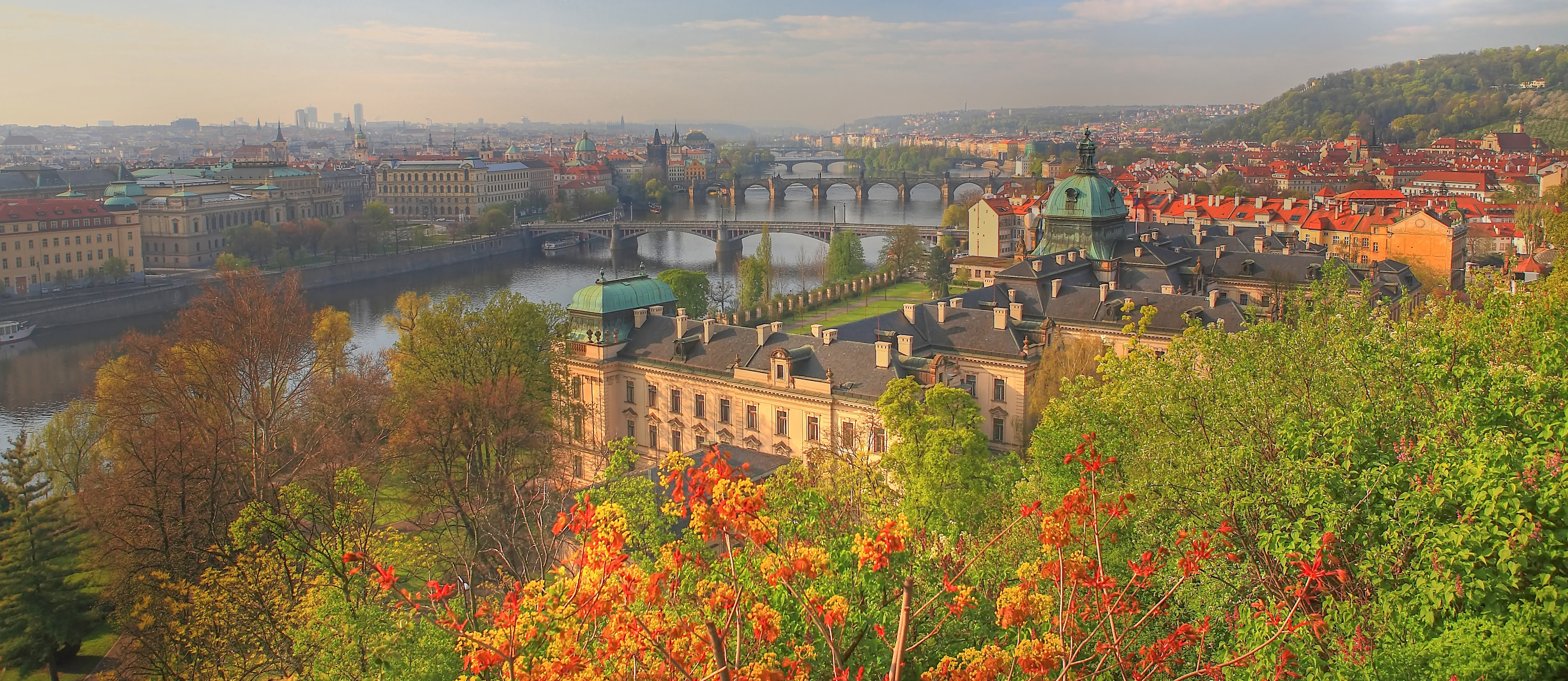
The Vltava in Prague

2. Vltava (Die Moldau) (12:51)

Vltava, also known by its English title The Moldau, and the German Die Moldau, was composed between 20 November and 8 December 1874 and was premiered on 4 April 1875 under Adolf Čech. It is about 13 minutes long, and is in the key of E minor. It is the best known of the poems, often performed separately from the full work.

In this piece, Smetana uses tone painting to evoke the sounds of one of Bohemia's great rivers. In his own words:

The composition describes the course of the Vltava, starting from the two small springs, the Studená and Teplá Vltava, to the unification of both streams into a single current, the course of the Vltava through woods and meadows, through landscapes where a farmer's wedding is celebrated, the round dance of the mermaids in the night's moonshine: on the nearby rocks loom proud castles, palaces and ruins aloft. The Vltava swirls into the St John's Rapids; (Note: The rapids no longer exist, having been flooded by the creation of Štěchovice Reservoir) then it widens and flows toward Prague, past the Vyšehrad, and then majestically vanishes into the distance, ending at the Elbe.

Vltava contains Smetana's most famous tune. It is an adaptation of the melody La Mantovana, attributed to the Italian Renaissance tenor Giuseppe Cenci, which, in a borrowed Romanian form, was also the basis for the Israeli national anthem Hatikvah. The tune also appears in an old Czech folk song, Kočka leze dírou ("The Cat Crawls Through the Hole"); Hanns Eisler used it for his "Song of the Moldau"; and Stan Getz performed it as "Dear Old Stockholm" (possibly through another derivative of the original tune, "Ack Värmeland du sköna"). Horst Jankowski played a syncopated version of the tune on his easy listening hit, "A Walk in the Black Forest."

The piece is featured in Don Hertzfeldt's short film Everything Will Be OK (2006) and in Terrence Malick's The Tree of Life (2011).

=== 3. Šárka ===
3. Šárka
Performed by the Skidmore College Orchestra. Courtesy of Musopen

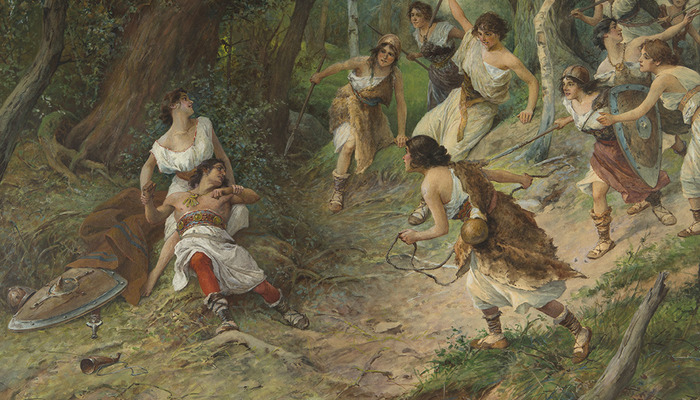
Šárka and Ctirad: Věnceslav Černý

The third poem was finished on 20 February 1875 and is named for the female warrior Šárka, a central figure in the ancient Czech legend of The Maidens' War. Šárka ties herself to a tree as bait and waits to be saved by the princely knight Ctirad, deceiving him into believing that she is an unwilling captive of the rebelling women. Once released by Ctirad, who has quickly fallen in love with her, Šárka serves him and his comrades with drugged mead and once they have fallen asleep she sounds a hunting horn: an agreed signal to the other women. The poem ends with the warrior maidens falling upon and murdering the sleeping men. It was first performed under the baton of Adolf Čech (sources disagree whether this was on 10 December 1876 or 17 March 1877).

=== 4. Z českých luhů a hájů ===
Smetana finished composing this piece, commonly translated as "From Bohemia's Woods and Fields" or "From Bohemian Fields and Groves", on 18 October 1875, and it received its first public performance nearly eight weeks later, on 10 December. A depiction of the beauty of the Czech countryside and its people, the tone poem tells no real story. The first part is dedicated to the grandeur of the forest with a surprising fugue in the strings, interrupted by a soft woodland melody of the horns, which is later taken over by the whole orchestra. In the second part, a village festival is depicted in full swing. This tone poem was originally written to be the finale of Má vlast.

=== 5. Tábor ===
This piece, which was finished on 13 December 1878 and premiered on 4 January 1880, is named after the town of Tábor in South Bohemia founded by the Hussites and serving as their centre during the Hussite Wars. The theme for the piece is quoted from the first two lines of the Hussite hymn, "Ktož jsú boží bojovníci" ("Ye Who Are Warriors of God").

=== 6. Blaník ===
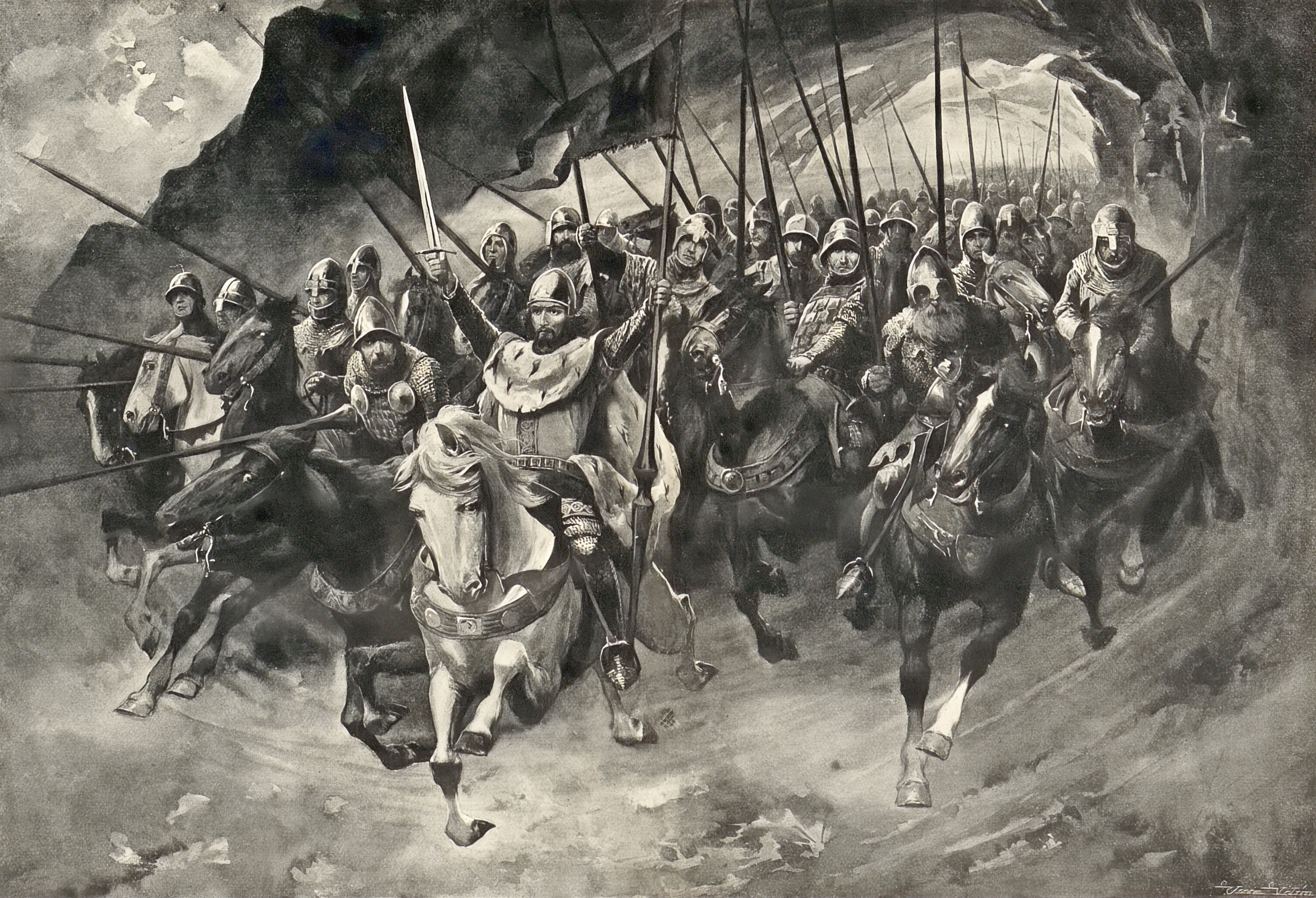
Army of knights led by St. Wenceslas: Věnceslav Černý

Blaník was finished on 9 March 1879 and premiered on 4 January 1880. It is named for the mountain Blaník inside which a legend says that a huge army of knights led by St. Wenceslaus sleep. The knights will awake and help the country in its gravest hour (sometimes described as four hostile armies attacking from all cardinal directions).

Musically, Blaník begins exactly as Tábor ends, "hammering" out the motto which was left unresolved, but now continuing on, as if in the aftermath of the battle. Thus these last two tone poems of the cycle form a cohesive pair, as do the first two; the High Castle's theme returns as the Vltava's river journey triumphantly reaches that same destination, and again returns triumphantly at the end of Blaník. Once again, the Hussite hymn used in Tábor is quoted, though this time it is the third line which rings out in the march at the end of the piece. The original lyrics to this line in the hymn are "so that finally with Him you will always be victorious", a reference to the eventual victorious rise of the Czech state.

== Instrumentation ==
The work is scored for piccolo, two flutes, two oboes, two clarinets, two bassoons, four French horns, two trumpets, three trombones, tuba, timpani, bass drum, triangle, cymbals, two harps, and strings.
