= Gasparo Zanetti =

Italian composer

Gasparo Zanetti (after 1600 – 1660) was an Italian violin teacher, composer of the Baroque, who lived and worked in Milan.

== Life and work ==
Information about Gasparo Zanetti's life is limited to his known works. In 1626 he published a two-part version of an original three-part canzone by Rivolta. Zanetti became known for his important legacy, compiled by him in a work for violin students which he published in 1645 with Carlo Camagno in Milan. In the early 19th century, Peter Lichtenthal rediscovered the work and printed a second edition. All dances in the collection are named for the noble families of Milan or of musicians.

Of educational interest is the fact that each dance is accompanied by a tablature, including the fingering (all in the first position) for all stringed instruments, as well as the letter "P" for spread (Pontar in sù) and "T" for smear (tirare in giù), modeled by Francesco Rognoni Taeggio in his Selva di varii passagi... (1620). only two copies of this print are currently known, which are owned by the Bibliothèque de France in Paris and the Biblioteca del Conservatorio in Florence
