= Naftali Herz Imber =

Jewish poet, writer of Israel's national anthem (1856–1909)

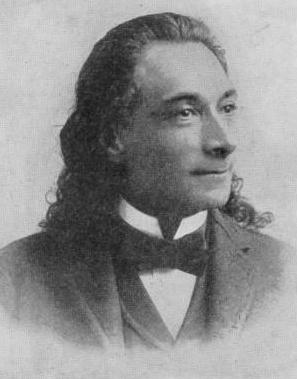
- Born: Naftali Herz Imber; 27 December 1856; Zolochiv, Galicia, Austrian Empire
- Died: 8 October 1909 (aged 52); New York City, New York, US
- Resting place: Givat Shaul Cemetery, Jerusalem, Israel; 31°47′53.28″N 35°10′39.82″E
- Known for: Hatikvah (The Hope)

Naftali Herz Imber (Hebrew: נפתלי הרץ אימבר, Yiddish: נפתלי הערץ אימבער; December 27, 1856 – October 8, 1909) was a Jewish Hebrew-language poet, most notable for writing "Hatikvah", the poem that became the basis for the Israeli national anthem.

== Biography ==
Naftali Herz Imber was born in Złoczów (now Zolochiv, Ukraine), a city in Galicia, which then was part of the Austrian Empire. His parents were Joshua Heschel Schorr and Hodel Imber, who followed a strictly Orthodox lifestyle. He began writing poetry at the age of 10 and several years later received an award from Emperor Franz Joseph for a poem on the centenary of Bukovina's joining to the Austrian Empire. His brother, Shmaryahu Imber, also became a writer and a local teacher, and his son, Naftali's nephew Shmuel Yankev, became a Yiddish language poet. In his youth Naftali Herz Imber traveled through Hungary, Serbia, and Romania.

In 1882 Imber moved to Ottoman Palestine as a secretary of Sir Laurence Oliphant. He lived with Oliphant and his wife Alice in their homes in Haifa and Daliyat al-Karmel. Oliphant sent him to Beirut to learn the art of watchmaking. Upon his return he helped Imber open a shop in Haifa. In 1884, he moved to Jerusalem, where he wrote poems suffused with elation and hope. In 1889, after quarreling with Oliphant, Imber departed for England. From there he traveled to Paris, Berlin and Bombay. In 1892, he headed for the United States, traveling from one city to another.

In Chicago he met a Protestant physician, Amanda Katie, who converted to Judaism and married him. Israel Zangwill described her as "a Christian crank." The brief marriage ended in divorce. The eminent Jewish judge, Mayer Sulzberger, became his benefactor, providing him with a monthly allowance that allowed him to survive.

== Literary career ==
In 1882, he published his first book of poems, Morning Star (ברקאי Barkai), in Jerusalem. One of the book's poems was Tikvateinu ("Our Hope"); its very first version was written already in 1877 in Iaşi, Romania. This poem soon became the lyrics of the Zionist anthem and later the Israeli national anthem Hatikvah.

Imber has been described as the "first Hebrew beatnik." He made a mockery of the serious and had a sardonic vulgar wit. Apart from writing his own poems, Imber also translated Omar Khayyam into Hebrew. Additionally, he published Treasures of Two Worlds: Unpublished Legends and Traditions of the Jewish Nation (1910), which posited that the Tabernacle carried by the Hebrews during their 40 years in the desert contained an electrical generator, and that King Solomon invented the telephone.

Imber died penniless in New York City on October 8, 1909, from the effects of chronic alcoholism, nonetheless beloved by the local Jewish community. He had made prior arrangement for his burial by selling a poem, but with his immediate family living in Europe and unavailable to make his funeral arrangements, there was controversy about the cemetery in which he was to be buried. He was buried in Mount Zion Cemetery in Queens, In 1953, he was re-interred at Har HaMenuchot, in Jerusalem.

== See also ==
- Hebrew literature
