= Mille Fleur =

Mille Fleur may refer to:

- Mille Fleur (chicken), the common U.S. name for the Belgian Bearded d'Uccle chicken
- Mille-fleur (Thousand Flowers), a background made of many small flowers and plants
