= Margaret B. Freeman =

American museum curator (1899-1980)

Margaret B. Freeman (1899 – 24 May 1980) was an American art historian who was the head curator of The Cloisters, a branch of the Metropolitan Museum of Art dedicated to medieval art and architecture, from 1955 to 1965. She studied medieval tapestries as well as the use of plants in medieval art.

== Early life and education ==
Margaret Beam Freeman was born in 1899 in West Orange, New Jersey. She attended Wellesley College before receiving her master's degree from Columbia University.

== Career ==
After receiving her master's degree, Freeman worked as a research assistant at The Newark Museum of Art. After parting with the museum in 1925, she taught at Dana Hall School in Wellesley, Massachusetts. In 1928, Freeman was hired as the first lecturer at the original site for The Cloisters, a branch of the Metropolitan Museum of Art, where she gave lectures on Egyptian and medieval art. While researching the history and symbolism of medieval plants, Freeman aided James J. Rorimer in planning the gardens at the museum's permanent building, which opened in 1938. Her research on the Cloisters' medieval gardens culminated in the publishing of Herbs for the Mediaeval Household (1943), a book on early medieval illustrations of plants within the Metropolitan Museum of Art's collections.

In 1940, Freeman became an assistant curator at The Cloisters, then was promoted again to associate curator after Rorimer was called to serve in World War II. From 1943 until Rorimer's return, Freeman acted as head curator of The Cloisters, a position she would attain in 1955 after Rorimer became director of the Metropolitan Museum of Art. She retired in 1965, but remained associated with the Cloisters as a curator emeritus until her death.

Following her retirement, Freeman published two books on textiles exhibited at the Cloisters. The first book, The St. Martin Embroideries (1968), analyzed a series of embroideries illustrating the life of Martin of Tours, a French saint who served in the Roman military before converting to Christianity and becoming a monk. The second book, The Unicorn Tapestries (1976), analyzed The Hunt of the Unicorn, a series of seven tapestries illustrating a group of noblemen in pursuit of a unicorn.

=== Selected works ===
- Herbs for the Mediaeval Household: For Cooking, Healing, and Divers Uses (1943)
- The St. Martin Embroideries: A Fifteenth-century Series Illustrating the Life and Legend of St. Martin of Tours (1968)
- The Unicorn Tapestries (1976)

== Personal life ==
Freeman died at her home in Manhattan on 24 May 1980, at the age of 80.
