= The Unicorn in Captivity =

Late Gothic tapestry from Southern Netherlands

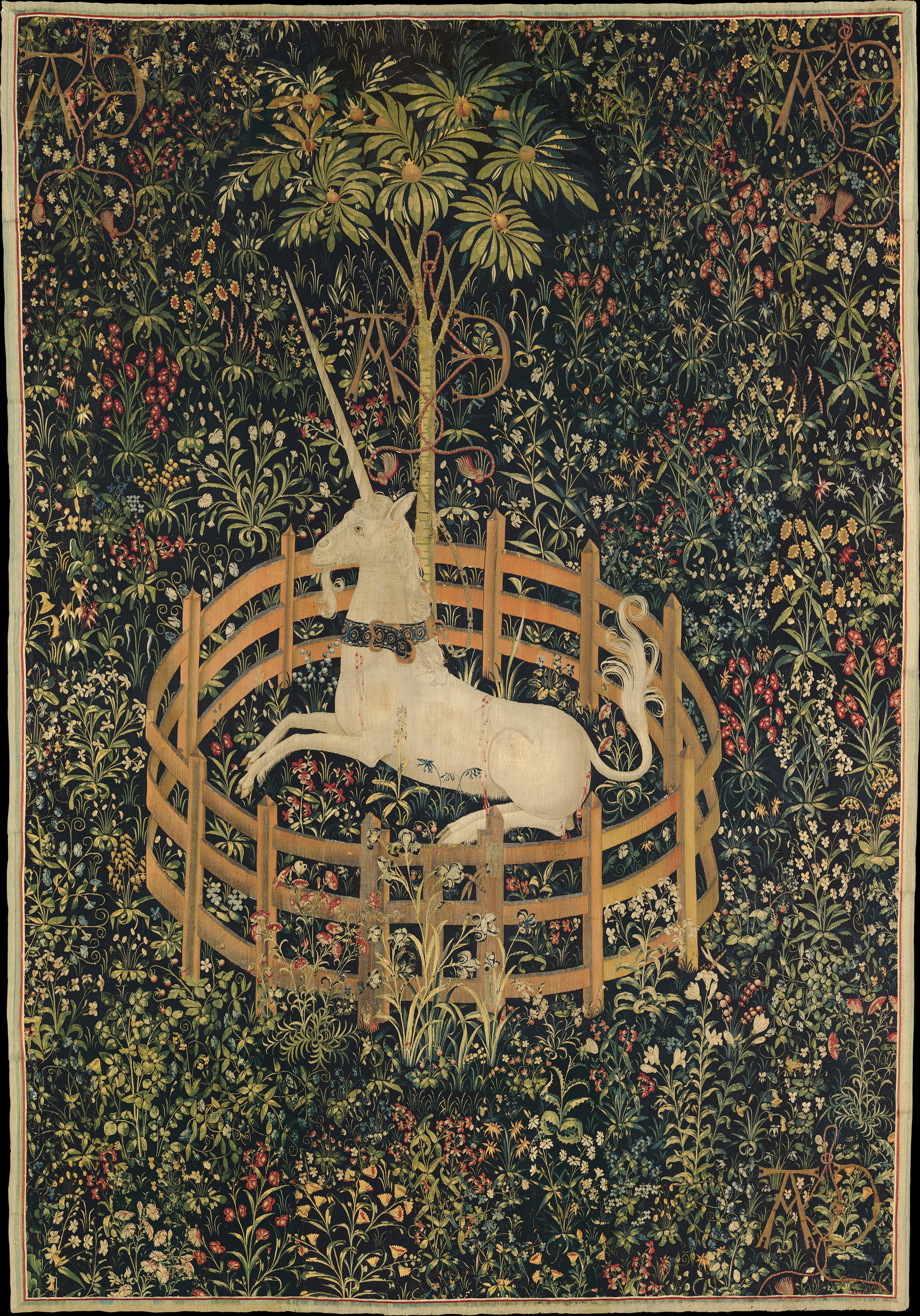
The tapestry

The Unicorn in Captivity (also The Unicorn Rests in a Garden) is a late Gothic era tapestry. It was made in the Southern Netherlands between 1495 and 1505. It is the seventh and final tapestry in The Unicorn Tapestries series. The tapestry depicts a unicorn chained to a tree in a small circular enclosure against a background of various vegetation. It is now on permanent exhibition at The Cloisters in New York City.

== History ==
The Unicorn Tapestries, the series that contains The Unicorn in Captivity, were created in the Southern Netherlands between 1495 and 1505 using woven fabric. The conservation of these tapestries is sophisticated. In the Middle Ages, woven tapestries were more admirable and of higher status than paintings. They were immediate signifiers of the wealth of their patron. The series was tied with an extensive story of the hunting and the mythical creature, the unicorn. Each individual tapestry portrays a different key moment of the unicorn's story. The seventh and final tapestry is titled The Unicorn in Captivity.

Some believe that The Unicorn in Captivity could have been created at a different time, by a different artist, and could never have been part of the series to begin with. This tapestry, widely known to be the seventh and final of The Unicorn Tapestries, could have actually been an independent work.

In September 2024, The New York Times chose The Unicorn in Captivity for their "10 Minute Challenge". In this challenge, viewers were asked to give their attention to the work for 10 straight minutes.

== Subject ==
The story of The Unicorn in Captivity that continues the series is about a unicorn that has come to life again. In the previous tapestry, the creature was killed and brought back to the castle. The unicorn resides in a beautiful garden filled with vibrant flowers, enclosed by a gate and chained by its neck to a pomegranate tree, which is an allegory of marriage and fertility. Hunting and capturing the unicorn was desirable due to the notion that its horn was able to neutralize poison. The unicorn is chained to the tree by a dark belt around its neck that matches the background color. This chain is known as a love chain, also titled a chaine d'amour, and is an illustration of a male's intense devotion to his lover found in medieval poetry. There is a red substance that drips down the unicorn's neck, which some believe to be the blood of Christ, and others believe it to be the juice of the pomegranate: a symbol of fertility. The unicorn itself is known to be an allegory of fertility.

=== Background ===
The background of The Unicorn in Captivity is filled with illustrations of botanical characteristics; it symbolizes marriage and fertility. The Unicorn in Captivity's background also includes a large pomegranate tree, the largely signed letters "AE", a small frog in the lower right side, and a small, white fluttering butterfly. The pomegranate tree is a symbol of fertility, and the butterfly is a symbol of both love and fertility. The frog is, aside from the unicorn and some minuscule insects, the only other form of animal life.

Some of the botanical representations include orchids, carnations, daisies, madonna lilies, strawberry plants, red wallflowers, columbines, thistles, and more. Medieval herbalists said that depending on the specific part of an orchid a male ate (largest part versus lesser part), the male would have either a male or female child. The carnation is said to have been viewed in medieval times as an emblem of betrothal and marriage, as well as a sign of Christ or the Virgin. Daisies were given various names during the Middle Ages. France called daisies "paquerettes", signifying the joy of Easter, whereas Germany called the flowers "massliebe", which meant "measure of love". The large thistle in the center is known to be St. Mary's thistle and a symbol of the virgin's chastity.
