= The Mask and Mirror =

Studio album by Loreena McKennitt
- Released: March 15, 1994
- Genres: New-age; folk; world
- Length: 52:46
- Labels: Quinlan Road, Warner Bros.
- Producer: Loreena McKennitt

Loreena McKennitt chronology
The Visit (1991)	The Mask and Mirror (1994)	Live in San Francisco at the Palace of Fine Arts (1995)

Professional ratings
Review scores
Source	Rating
Allmusic	4.5/5 stars

The Mask and Mirror is the fifth studio album by Loreena McKennitt, released on March 15, 1994, the album has been certified Gold in the United States.

A 30th anniversary edition of the album titled "The Mask and Mirror - The Definitive Edition" was released on October 9, 2026.

== Overview ==
Like most of Loreena McKennitt's albums, The Mask and Mirror is heavily influenced by her travels. Her experiences in Spain and Morocco, specifically, serve as the inspiration for this album.

In the liner notes to the album, McKennitt wrote:

I looked back and forth through the window of 15th century Spain, through the hues of Judaism, Islam, and Christianity, and was drawn into a fascinating world: history, religion, cross-cultural fertilization....For some medieval minds the mirror was the door through which the soul frees itself by passing.... for others the pursuit of personal refinement was likened to polishing the mirror of the soul. From the more familiar turf of the west coast of Ireland, through the troubadours of France, crossing over the Pyrenees, and then to the west through Galicia, down through Andalusia and past Gibraltar to Morocco....the Crusades, the pilgrimage to Santiago, Cathars, the Knights Templar, the Sufis from Egypt, One Thousand and One Nights in Arabia, the Celtic imagery of trees, the Gnostic Gospels...who was God? and what is religion, what spirituality? What was revealed and what was concealed...and what was the mask and what the mirror?

Accompanying all the selections, as the liner remarks, are some of the entries in a traveler's log that McKennitt kept all throughout her journey.

The album's cover uses a collage made from the medieval The Hunt of the Unicorn tapestries.

== Tracks ==
Loreena McKennitt wrote the lyrics and composed the music for all the songs except as noted.

1. "The Mystic's Dream" – 7:40
2. "The Bonny Swans" (lyrics: traditional, arr. McKennitt, music by McKennitt) – 7:18
3. "The Dark Night of the Soul" (lyrics by St. John of the Cross, OCD; arr. McKennitt; music by McKennitt) – 6:44
4. "Marrakesh Night Market" – 6:30
5. "Full Circle" – 5:57
6. "Santiago" (traditional, arr. McKennitt) – 5:58
7. "Cé Hé Mise le Ulaingt?/The Two Trees" (lyrics by W. B. Yeats, music by McKennitt) – 9:06
8. "Prospero's Speech" (lyrics by William Shakespeare, arr. McKennitt, music by McKennitt) – 3:23

== Song details ==
- "The Mystic's Dream" was featured in the 2001 miniseries The Mists of Avalon, the 1995 film Jade and in the 2021 film Zeros and Ones.
- "The Bonny Swans" was made into a video.
- "The Dark Night of the Soul" is based on the poem "Dark Night of the Soul" by St. John of the Cross.
- "Santiago" is named after the Spanish city of Santiago de Compostela, and the melody is based on a spirited arrangement of the early 13th-century song "Non é gran cousa se sabe," number 26 of the Cantigas de Santa Maria.
- "Full Circle" was utilized in the Canadian TV series Due South in the season 2 episode "Juliet Is Bleeding".
- The opening of the song "Cé Hé Mise Le Ulaingt?/The Two Trees" is "Cé Hé Mise Le Ulaingt" ("Who am I to Bear It" in Irish), It was written and performed by Patrick Hutchinson on Uilleann pipes. The second part of the song is Loreena's version of "The Two Trees". Hence the two titles.
- "The Two Trees" derives its lyrics from a poem of William Butler Yeats.
- "Prospero's Speech" is the final soliloquy and epilogue by Prospero in William Shakespeare's play The Tempest. It was featured in Due South season 1 episode "Chinatown".
- "Cé Hé Mise le Ulaingt?" and "The Two Trees" were both featured in the soundtrack of Highlander III: The Sorcerer as well as "Bonny Portmore" from the album The Visit)

== Chart performance ==
Chart (1994)	Peak position
Australian Albums Chart	21
Dutch Albums Chart	54
Germany Albums Chart	18
New Zealand Albums Chart	15
Spanish Albums Chart	6
Swedish Albums Chart	25
US Billboard 200	143
US World Albums	1
US New Age Albums	7

== Certifications and sales ==
Region	Certification	Certified units/sales
Argentina (CAPIF)	Gold	30,000^{^}
Australia (ARIA)	Platinum	70,000^{^}
Canada (Music Canada)	3× Platinum	300,000^{^}
France (SNEP)	Gold	100,000^{*}
Germany	—	85,000
Italy (FIMI)	Platinum	100,000^{*}
Spain (Promusicae)	Gold	50,000^{^}
United States (RIAA)	Gold	795,000
Summaries
Worldwide	—	1,600,000
^{*} Sales figures based on certification alone.^{^} Shipments figures based on certification alone.

== Release history ==
Release dates and formats for The Mask and Mirror
Region	Date	Format(s)	Label(s)	Ref.
United Kingdom	September 27, 2004	CD+DVD	Cadiz Music	
