= The Unicorn Tapestries =

Tapestry series from the early 16th century

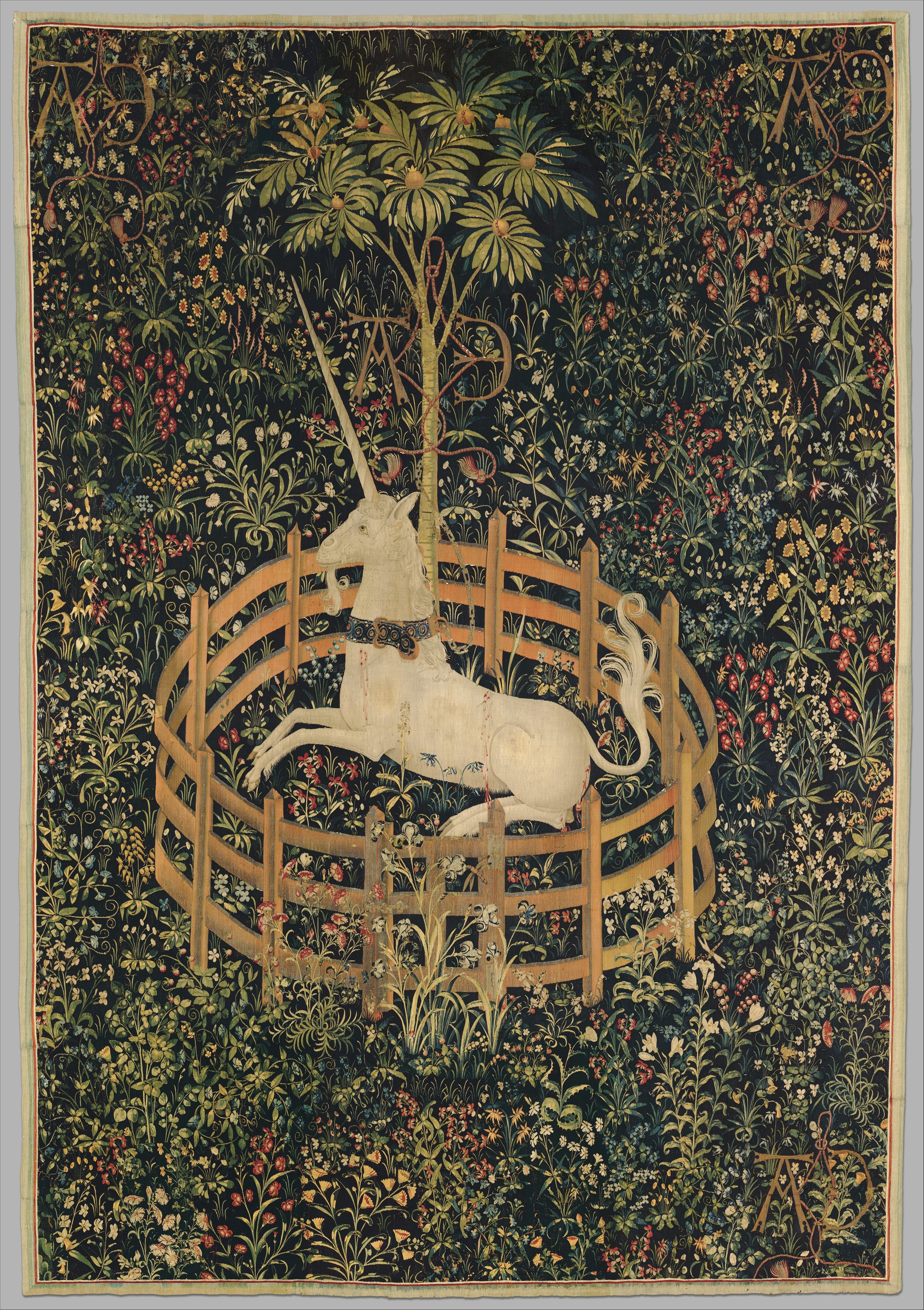
"The Unicorn Rests in a Garden", also called "The Unicorn in Captivity", is the best-known of the Unicorn Tapestries.

The Unicorn Tapestries or the Hunt of the Unicorn (French: La Chasse à la licorne) is a series of seven tapestries made in the Southern Netherlands around 1495–1505, and now in The Cloisters in New York City. They were possibly designed in Paris and woven in Brussels. They depict a group of noblemen and hunters in pursuit of a unicorn through an idealised French landscape. The tapestries were woven in wool, metallic threads, and silk. The vibrant colours, still evident today, were produced from dye plants: weld (yellow), madder (red), and woad (blue).

First recorded in 1680 in the Paris home of the Rochefoucauld family, the tapestries were looted during the French Revolution. Rediscovered in a barn in the 1850s, they were hung at the family's Château de Verteuil. Since then they have been the subject of intense scholarly debate about the meaning of their iconography, the identity of the artists who designed them, and the sequence in which they were meant to be hung. Although various theories have been put forward, currently nothing is known of their early history or provenance. Their dramatic but conflicting narratives have inspired multiple readings, from chivalric to Christological. Variations in size, style, and composition suggest they come from more than one set, linked by their subject matter, provenance, and the mysterious AE monogram which appears in each. One of the panels, "The Mystic Capture of the Unicorn", survives as just two fragments.

== History ==
=== Construction ===
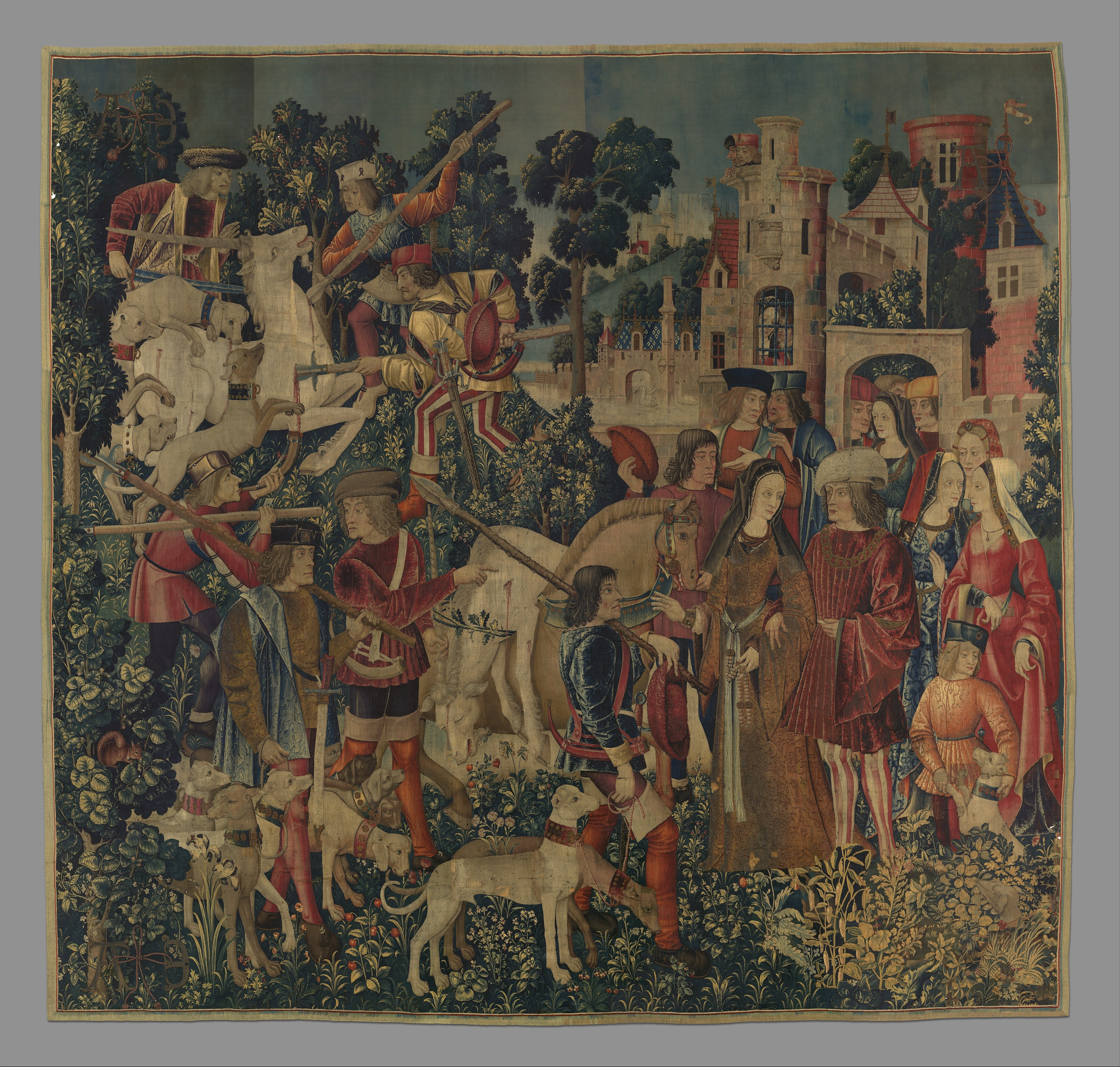
"The Hunters Return to the Castle"

Questions about the original workmanship of the tapestries remain unanswered. The design of the tapestries is rich in figurative elements, similar to those found in oil painting. They appear to be influenced by the French style, as the elements in the tapestries reflect the style of woodcuts and metalcuts made in Paris in the late fifteenth century.

The garden backgrounds of the tapestries are rich in floral imagery, featuring the "millefleurs" background style of a variety of small botanic elements. Invented by the weavers of the Gothic age, it became popular during the late medieval era and declined after the early Renaissance. There are more than a hundred plants represented in the tapestries, scattered across the green backgrounds of the panels, eighty-five of which have been identified by botanists. The particular flowers featured in the tapestries reflect the tapestries' major themes. In the unicorn series, the hunt takes place within a Hortus conclusus, literally meaning "enclosed garden", which was not only a representation of a secular, physical garden, but a connection with the Annunciation.

The tapestries were very probably woven in Brussels, which was an important center of the tapestry industry in medieval Europe. An example of the remarkable work of the Brussels looms, the tapestries' mixture of silk and metallic thread with wool gave them a fine quality and brilliant color. The wool was widely produced in the rural areas around Brussels, and a common primary material in tapestry weaving. The silk, however, was costly and hard to obtain, indicating the wealth and social status of the tapestry owner.

=== Provenance ===
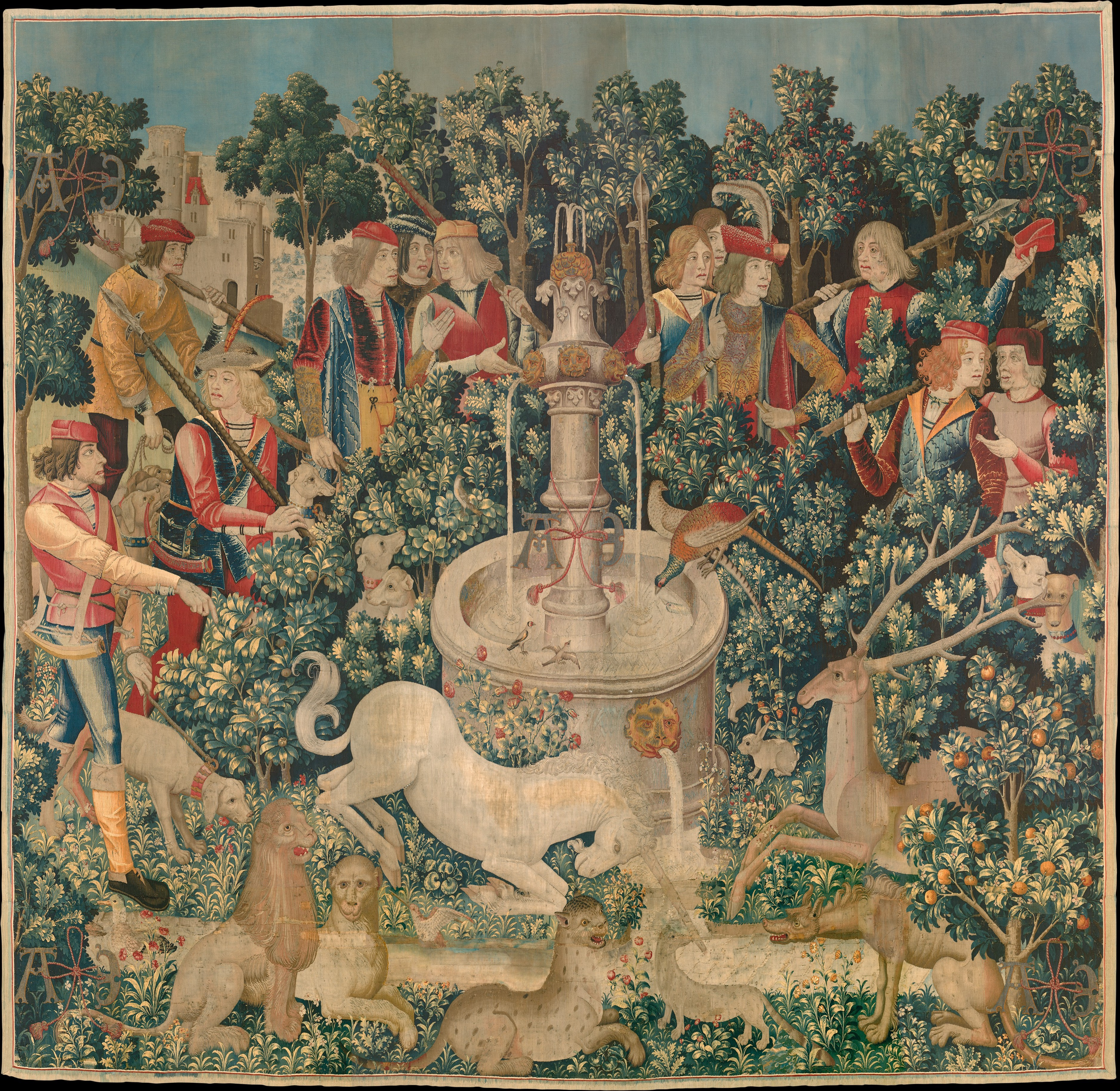
"The Unicorn Purifies Water"

The tapestries were owned by the La Rochefoucauld family of France for several centuries, with first mention of them showing up in the family's 1728 inventory. At that time five of the tapestries were hanging in a bedroom in the family's Château de Verteuil, Charente and two were stored in a hall adjacent to the chapel. The tapestries were highly believed woven for François, the son of Jean II de La Rochefoucauld and Marguerite de Barbezieux. There is a possible connection between the letters A and E and the La Rochefoucauld, which are interpreted as the first and last of Antoine's name, who was the son of François, and his wife, Antoinette of Amboise. During the French Revolution the tapestries were looted from the château and reportedly were used to cover potatoes – a period during which they apparently sustained damage. By the end of the 1880s they were again in the possession of the family. A visitor to the château described them as quaint 15th century wall hangings, yet showing "incomparable freshness and grace". The same visitor records the set as consisting of seven pieces, though one was by that time in fragments and being used as bed curtains.

John D. Rockefeller Jr. bought them in 1922 for about one million US dollars (equivalent to $19.2 million in 2025). Six of the tapestries hung in Rockefeller's house until The Cloisters was built when he donated them to the Metropolitan Museum of Art in 1938 and at the same time secured for the collection the two fragments the La Rochefauld family had retained. The set now hangs in The Cloisters, which houses the museum's medieval collection.

=== Restoration ===
In 1998 the tapestries were cleaned and restored. In the process, the linen backing was removed, the tapestries were bathed in water, and it was discovered that the colours on the back were in even better condition than those on the front (which are also quite vivid). A series of high resolution digital photographs were taken of both sides using a customised scanning device suspending a linear array scan camera and lighting over the delicate textile. The front and back of the tapestries were photographed in approximately three-by-three-foot square segments. The largest tapestry required up to 24 individual 5000 × 5000 pixel images. Merging the massive data stored in these photos required the efforts of two mathematicians, the Chudnovsky brothers.

== Subjects ==
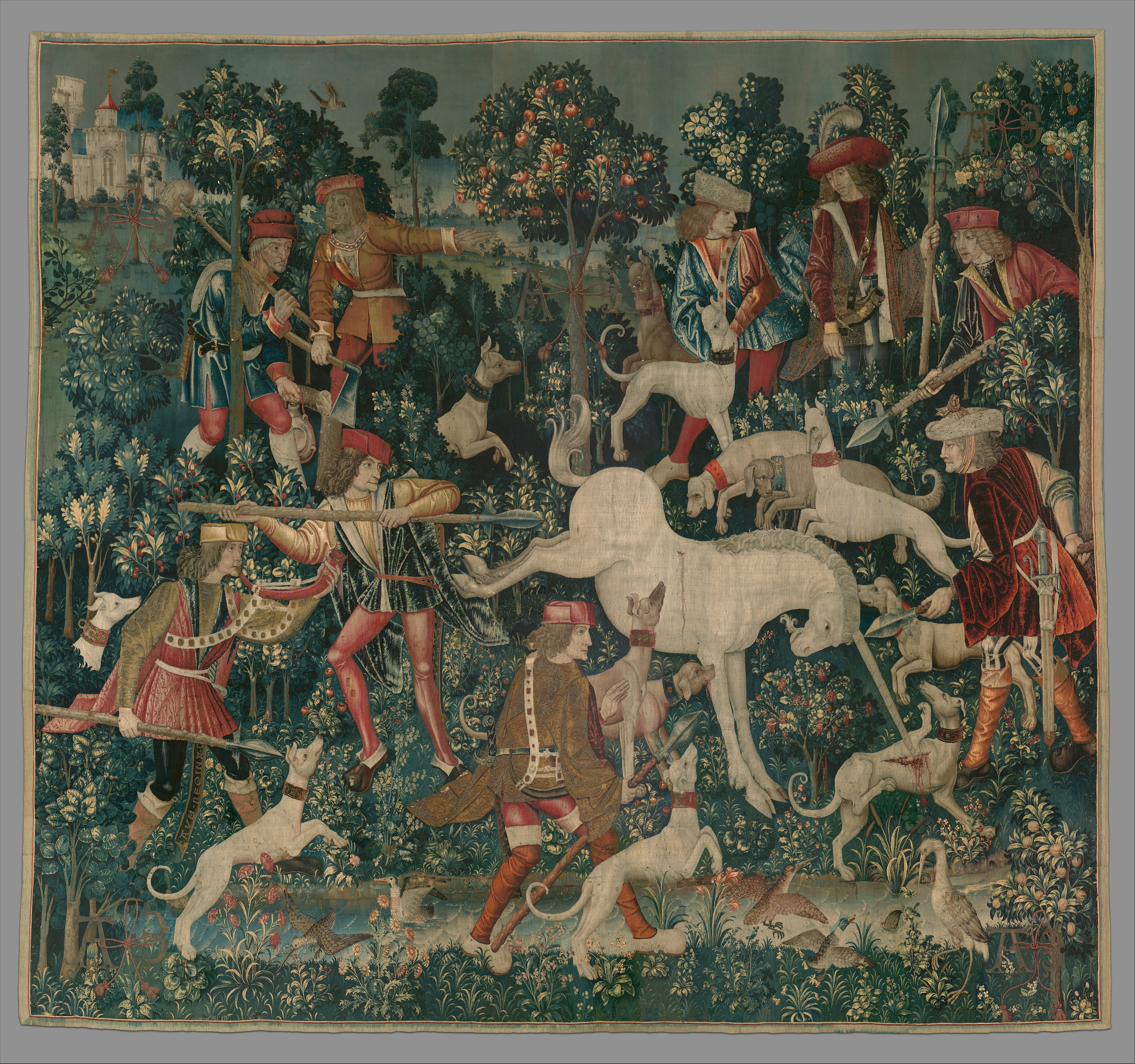
"The Unicorn Defends Himself"

The Metropolitan Museum of Art, which owns the tapestries, has titled and ordered them as follows:

1. "The Hunters Enter the Woods"
2. "The Unicorn Purifies Water"
3. "The Unicorn Crosses a Stream"
4. "The Unicorn Defends Himself"
5. "The Unicorn Surrenders to a Maiden" (two fragments)
6. "The Hunters Return to the Castle"
7. "The Unicorn Rests in a Garden"

The tapestries comprise five large pieces, one small piece, and two fragments.

The mobility associated with the size formed an essential consideration of the function of the tapestry in the medieval age. Different sizes of Gothic tapestries served as the decoration to fit chosen walls in the middle age. In modern-day research, based on the possibility that the unicorn tapestries were designed for use as a bedroom ensemble, the five large pieces fit the back area of a wall, while the other two pieces serve as the coverlet, or overhead canopy.

Other sources give slightly different titles and different sequences. The sequence of the tapestries is based on three main factors. The first is construction of the tapestries themselves, which exhibit differences of manufacture and size, may suggest that the first and last are independent works or form a different series. Secondly is the story of the classic stag hunt, usually cited to Livre de la Chasse by Gaston III, Count of Foix. Thirdly is the established story of the unicorn hunt, where the unicorn is made docile by a virgin, and then captured, wounded or killed.

"The Unicorn Rests in a Garden", smaller than the others, depicts the unicorn chained by its neck to a tree in a beautiful hortus conclusus garden filled with flowers, enclosed by a gate. No other figures are present in this image; the content consists solely of the unicorn in its entrapment. The pure, vivid whiteness of the unicorn is amplified in this seventh tapestry by the contrast of the body against the dark, forest green grass. The unicorn is chained to the tree by means of a dark belt around its neck that matches the background color.

== Analysis ==
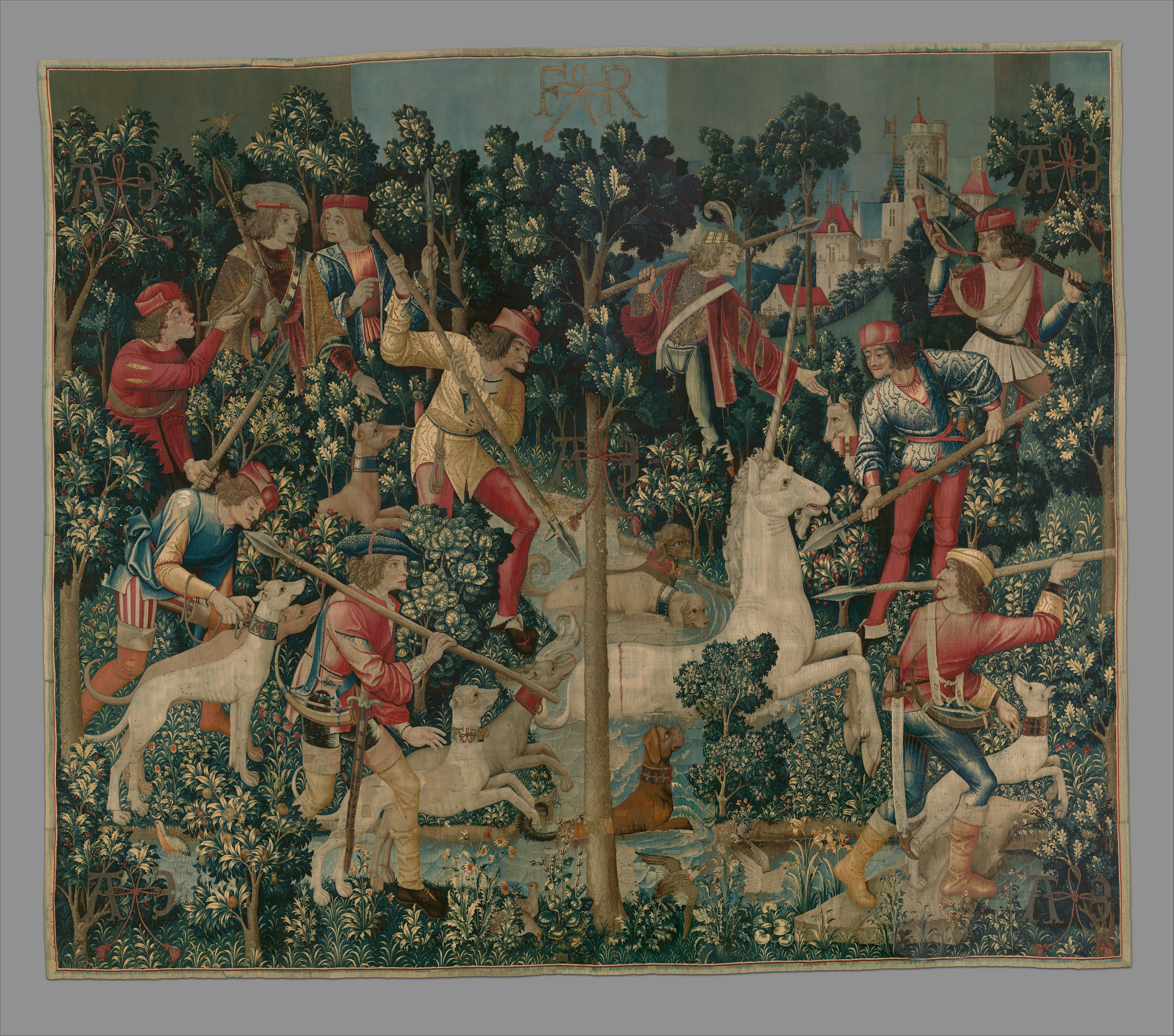
"The Unicorn Crosses a Stream"

=== Interpretation of themes ===
The entrapment of a unicorn by a virgin was a common theme in medieval folklore. Interpretations of the tapestries draw from analysis of this story.

The tapestries have been interpreted as an allegory of Christ. In the medieval period, the unicorn was accepted as a symbol of Christ. Contemporary unicorn folklore stated that the unicorn could only be captured if led by a virgin maiden; several scholars have drawn a connection between this theme and the birth of Jesus by the Virgin Mary. The subsequent pursuit of the unicorn by the hunters, killing, and resurrection can be read as metaphors for the arrest, crucifixion, and resurrection of Jesus Christ, respectively.

The tapestries have also been interpreted as an allegory of marriage. James Rorimer theorized that, as the designer of the tapestry has emphasized the secular nature of the unicorn hunt, rather than the Christian themes it represents, certain marriage-related symbols in the tapestries could suggest that the tapestries were created to celebrate a marriage. Margaret B. Freeman noted that medieval poets connected the taming of the unicorn to the devotion and subjugation of love. As such, Freeman equates the unicorn's seduction by a virgin and subsequent imprisonment to medieval notions of the lover held captive.

Freeman has pointed out that these interpretations are not contradictory, and were likely intended to complement each other, as the concept of an overlapping God of Heaven and God of Love was accepted in the late Middle Ages.

=== Monogram and origin ===
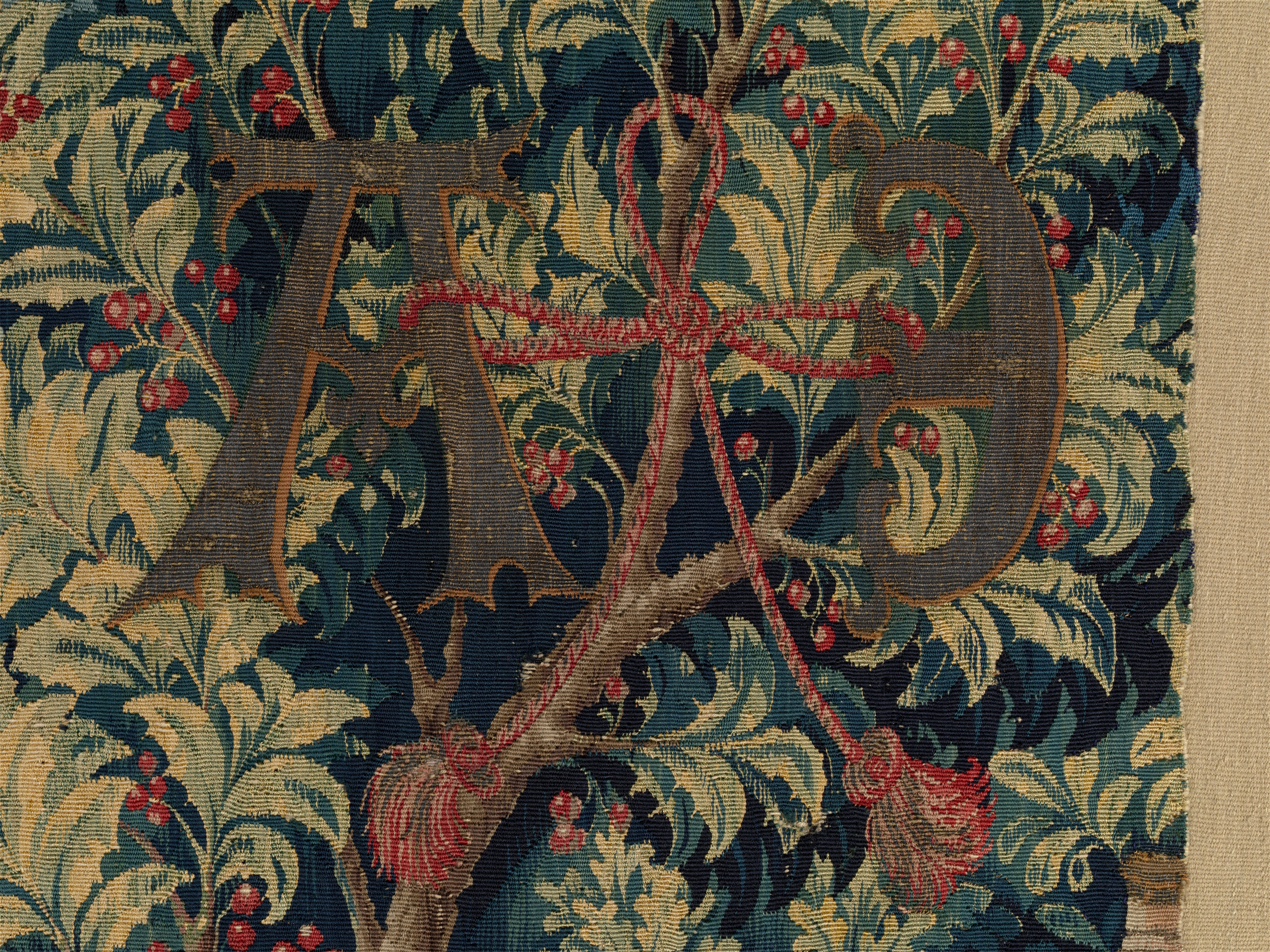
"AE" monogram

James J. Rorimer speculated in 1942 that the tapestries were commissioned by Anne of Brittany, to celebrate her marriage to King Louis XII in 1499. Rorimer interpreted the A and E monogram that appears in each tapestry as the first and the last letters of Anne's name. Margaret B. Freeman, however, rejected this interpretation in her 1976 monograph, a conclusion repeated by Adolph S. Cavallo in his 1998 work. Tom Campbell, former Director of the Metropolitan Museum of Art, acknowledged in 2002 that experts "still do not know for whom or where [the tapestries] were made."

== The Stirling Tapestries ==
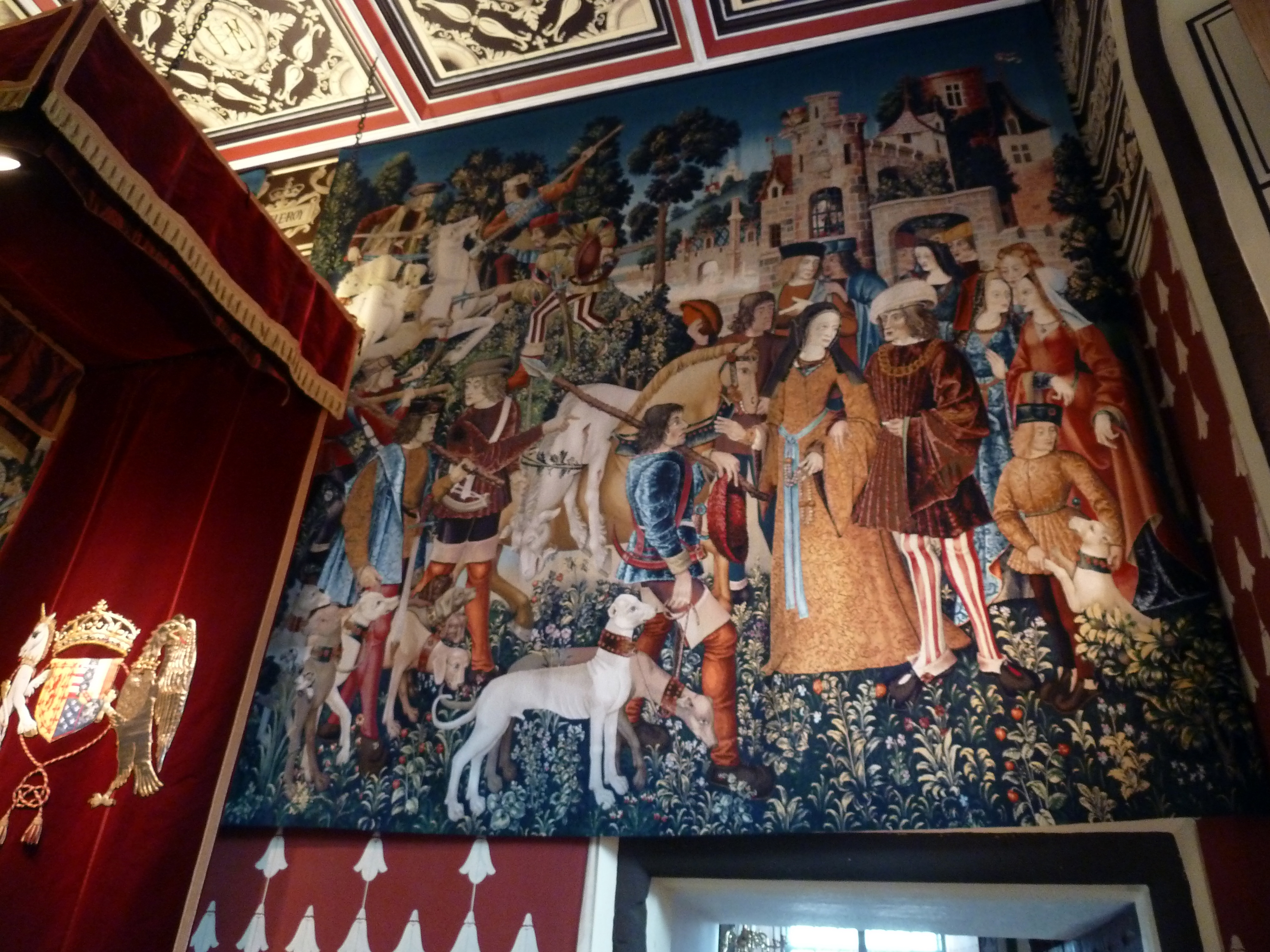
"The Hunters Return to the Castle" tapestry, hanging in Mary of Guise's Inner Hall in the Royal Palace at Stirling Castle.

Historic Scotland commissioned a set of seven hand-made tapestries for Stirling Castle, a recreation of The Unicorn Tapestries, as part of a project to furnish the castle as it was in the 16th century. It was part-funded by the Quinque Foundation of the United States.

All seven currently hang in the Queen's Inner Hall in the Royal Palace.

The tapestry project was managed by West Dean College in West Sussex and work began in January 2002. The weavers worked in two teams, one based at the college, the other in a purpose-built studio in the Nether Bailey of Stirling Castle. The first three tapestries were completed in Chichester, the remainder at Stirling Castle.

Historians studying the reign of James IV believe that a similar series of "Unicorn" tapestries were part of the Scottish Royal tapestry collection. The team at West Dean Tapestry visited the Metropolitan Museum of Art to inspect the originals and researched the medieval techniques, the colour palette and materials. Traditional techniques and materials were used with mercerised cotton taking the place of silk to preserve its colour better. The wool was specially dyed at West Dean College.

== In popular culture ==
- In 1961, Leonard Cohen published The Spice Box of Earth, a collection of poems including "The Unicorn Tapestries".
- The opening sequence of the 1982 animated movie The Last Unicorn was designed in reference to the tapestries, with many elements such as the fountain and lions, as well as the overall style being extremely similar.
- The seventh tapestry in the series ("The Unicorn in Captivity") appears briefly in Harry Potter and the Half Blood Prince, adorning the wall of a corridor near the Room of Requirement and the tapestry is seen in the various common rooms (Gryffindor, Slytherin, Ravenclaw, and Hufflepuff) with different coloured backgrounds. It also appears in the film adaptation of Harry Potter and the Deathly Hallows. At Universal Studios in Los Angeles and Orlando, replicas of this tapestry can be seen adorning the wall in the queue for the Forbidden Journey ride which replicates the interior of the Hogwarts Castle.
- In Spider-Man: Far From Home, in the shot of MJ's (Zendaya) first appearance in the art room of the school, "The Unicorn in Captivity" can be spotted in the upper right corner.
- It appears in Rumplestiltskin's castle in Once Upon a Time.
- It appears in the episode "The Lich" in Season 4 of Adventure Time.
- It appears above Stewie's cot in the episode "Chap Stewie" of season 12 of Family Guy.
- It appears in BoJack Horseman in S2E2
- The tapestry "The Unicorn is Found" appears in one of the last scenes in the film Ghosts of Girlfriends Past.
- It appears in the 1988 film Some Girls.
- It appears in the 1993 film The Secret Garden.
- In a French commercial for the cheese "Coeur de Lion", which means "Lionheart". Pub Coeur de Lion – Moyen Age.
- A collage of the tapestry appears on the cover of the music album The Mask and Mirror by Canadian composer-musician Loreena McKennitt.
- The tapestries' millefleur were adapted and redesigned by artist Leon Coward for the mural The Happy Garden of Life in the 2016 science fiction film 2BR02B: To Be or Naught to Be as part of the mural's religious allusions. The flowers are modeled on those in The Unicorn in Captivity.
- Readers of Mary Pope Osborne's Magic Tree House series are introduced to the tapestries and the Cloisters Museum in Blizzard of the Blue Moon.
- The tapestries are the subject matter of Samuel R. Delany's short story "Tapestry", found in Aye, and Gomorrah, and other stories.
- "The Unicorn in Captivity" appears in a seventh-season episode of The Venture Brothers, which is also named after the tapestry.
- "The Unicorn in Captivity" is displayed in Sabrina's house in the 2018 TV series The Chilling Adventures of Sabrina (best seen in episode 9).
- "The Unicorn in Captivity" is displayed in Niles Caulder's house in the 2019 TV series Doom Patrol (best seen in episode 7).
- The tapestries are mentioned in the 1982 novel Annie on My Mind, in which the main characters see and discuss the tapestries while visiting The Cloisters Museum.
- Pearls Before Swine's 1970 album The Use of Ashes features a detail of "The Hunters Return to the Castle" on its cover.
- "The Unicorn in Captivity" is the primary background art for the script publication of the play Heroes of the Fourth Turning.
- In the 2025 film Death of a Unicorn, the story of the tapestries is used as a parallel to the film's events. The fifth tapestry, which only exists in fragments, is fictitiously revealed in its entirety in the film, depicting the unicorn violently killing its captors.
- "The Unicorn Purifies Water" is displayed in a medieval room that lead character Rowan is passing when she is moving in a memory through time in the 2023 TV series Mayfair Witches (seen in season 1, episode 8).
- "The Unicorn in Captivity" is seen on the wall after the proposal scene in Season 2 Episode 4 of the Netflix show Shadow and Bone.

== The full set ==
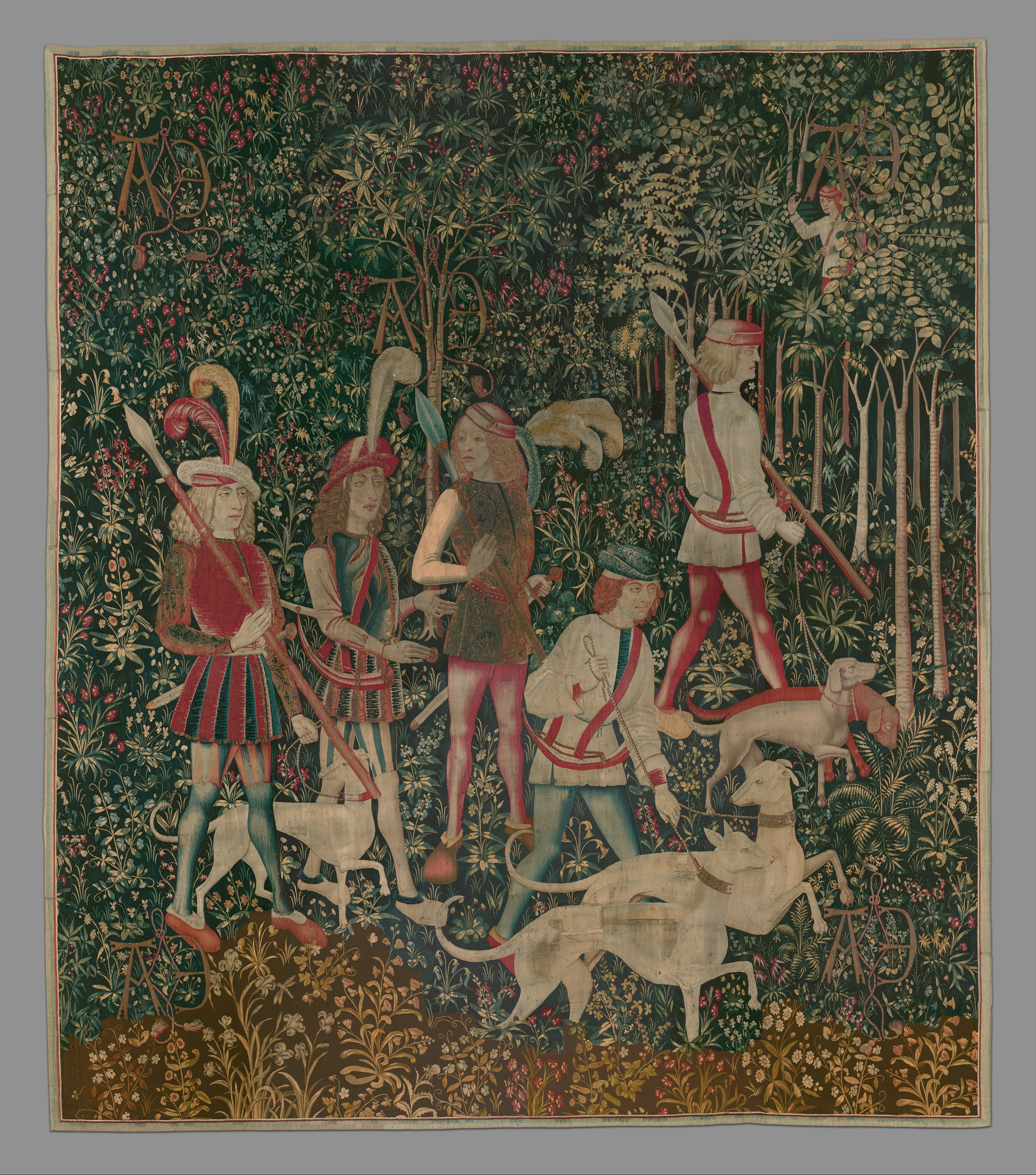
"The Hunters Enter the Woods"

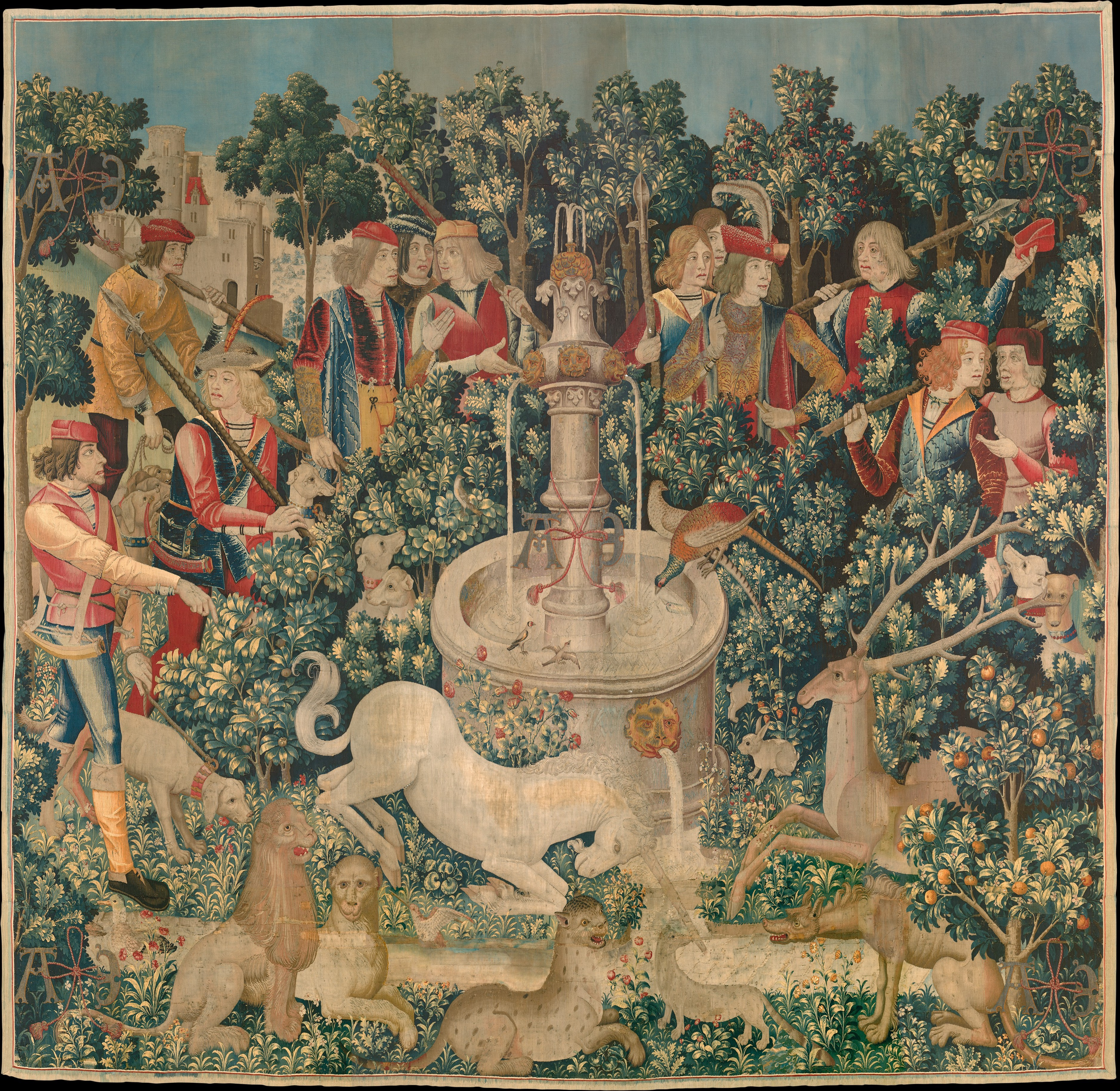
"The Unicorn Purifies Water"

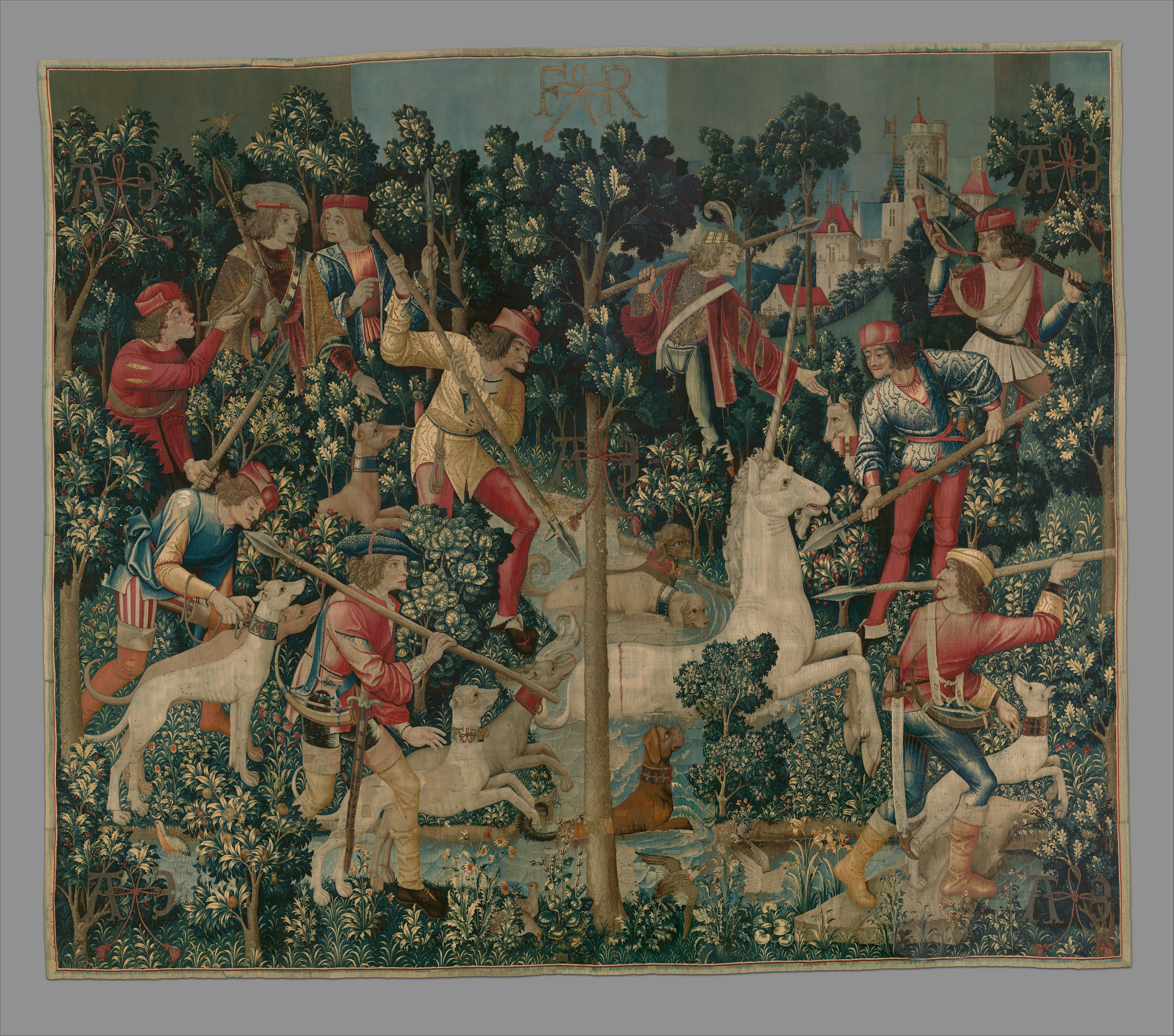
"The Unicorn Crosses a Stream"

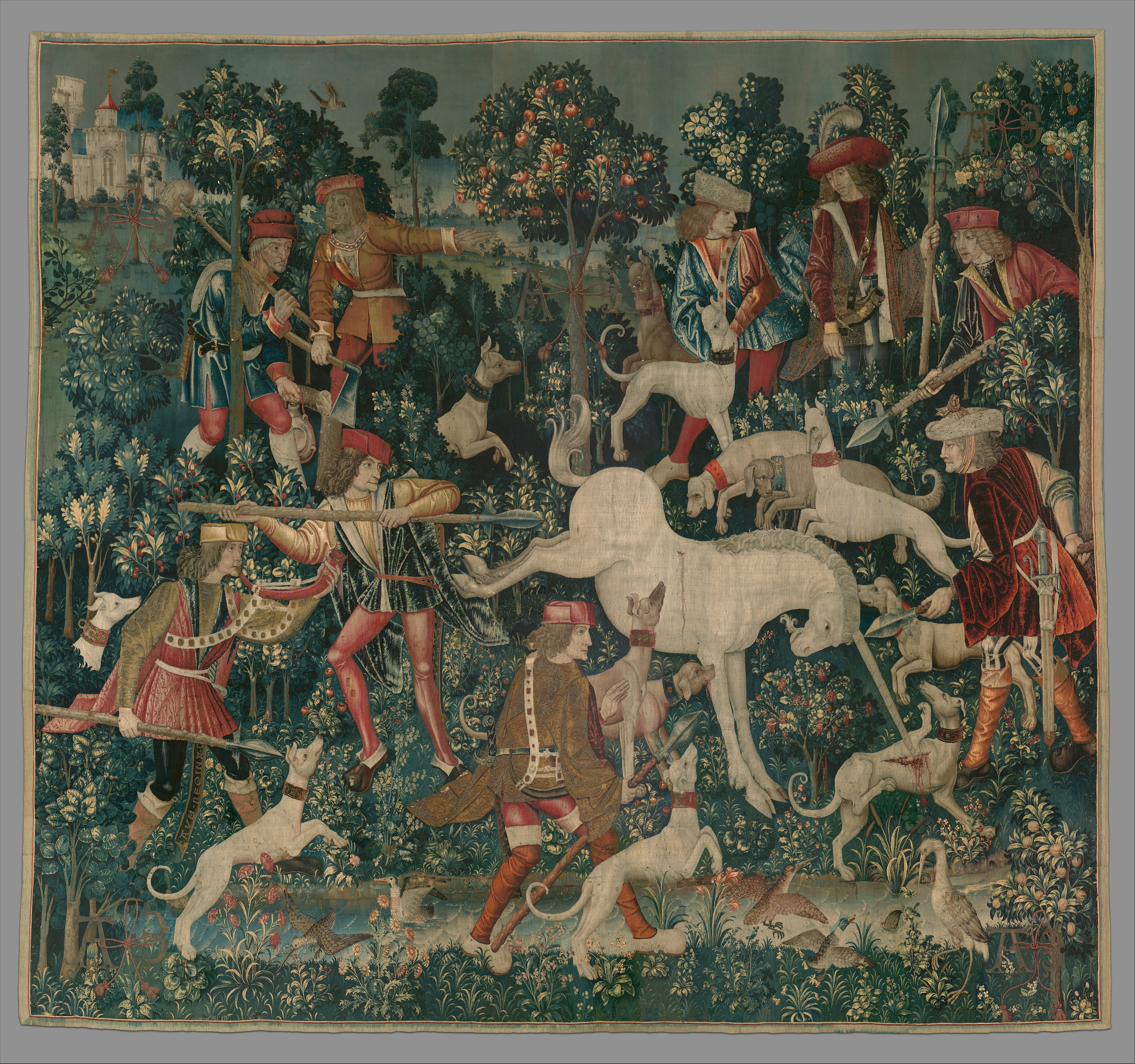
"The Unicorn Defends Himself"

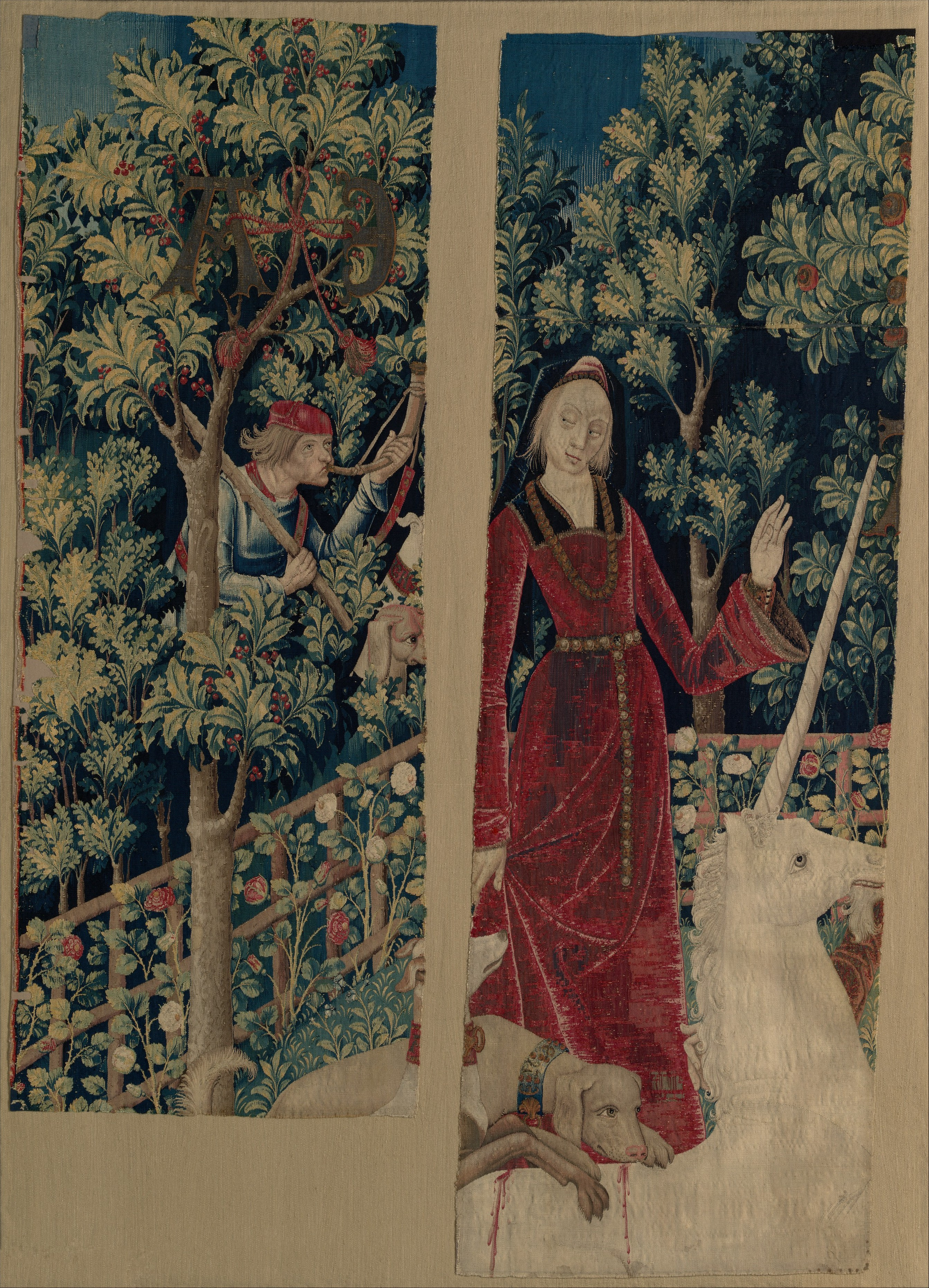
The two Fragments of "The Unicorn Surrenders to a Maiden"

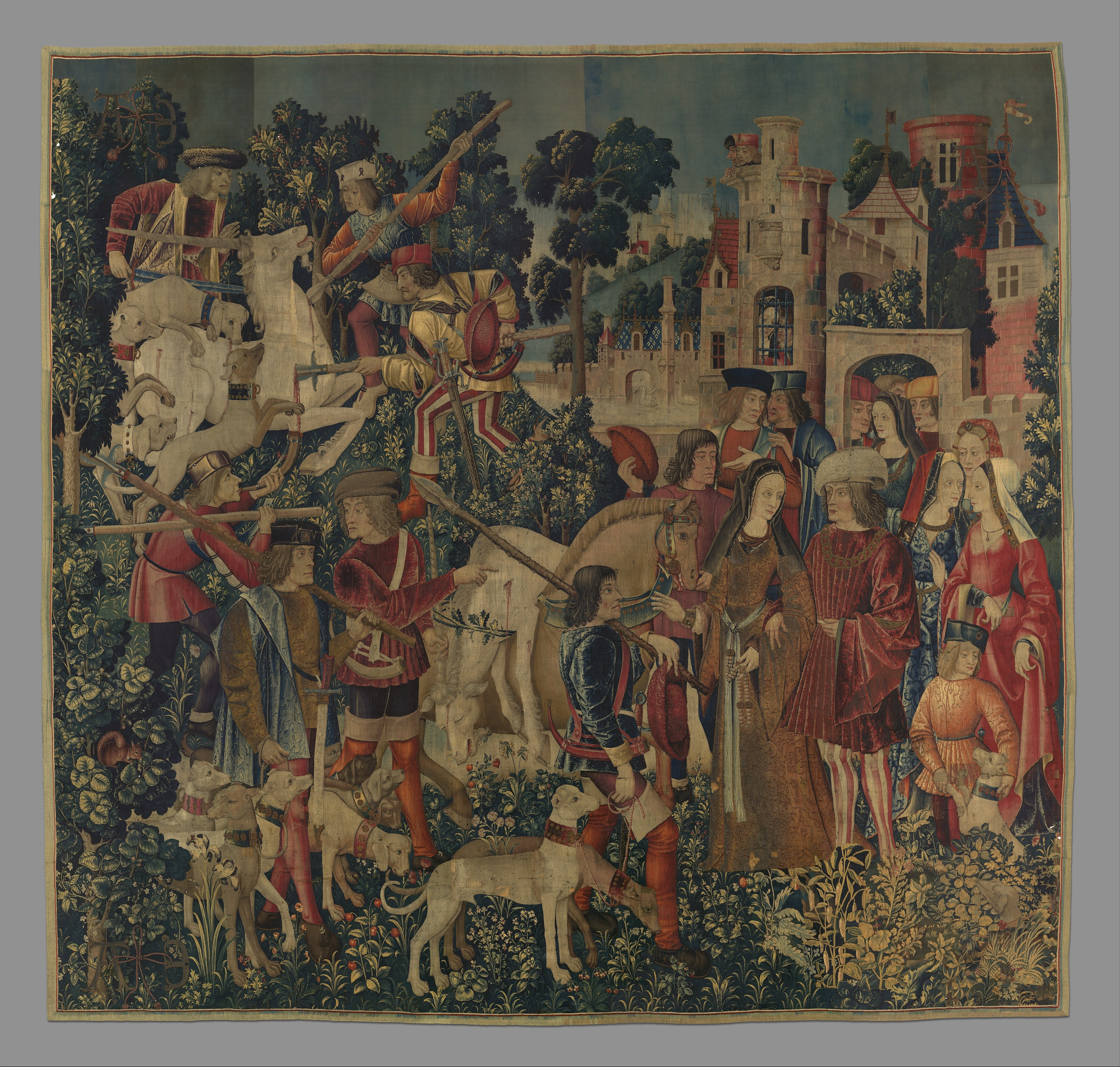
"The Hunters Return to the Castle"

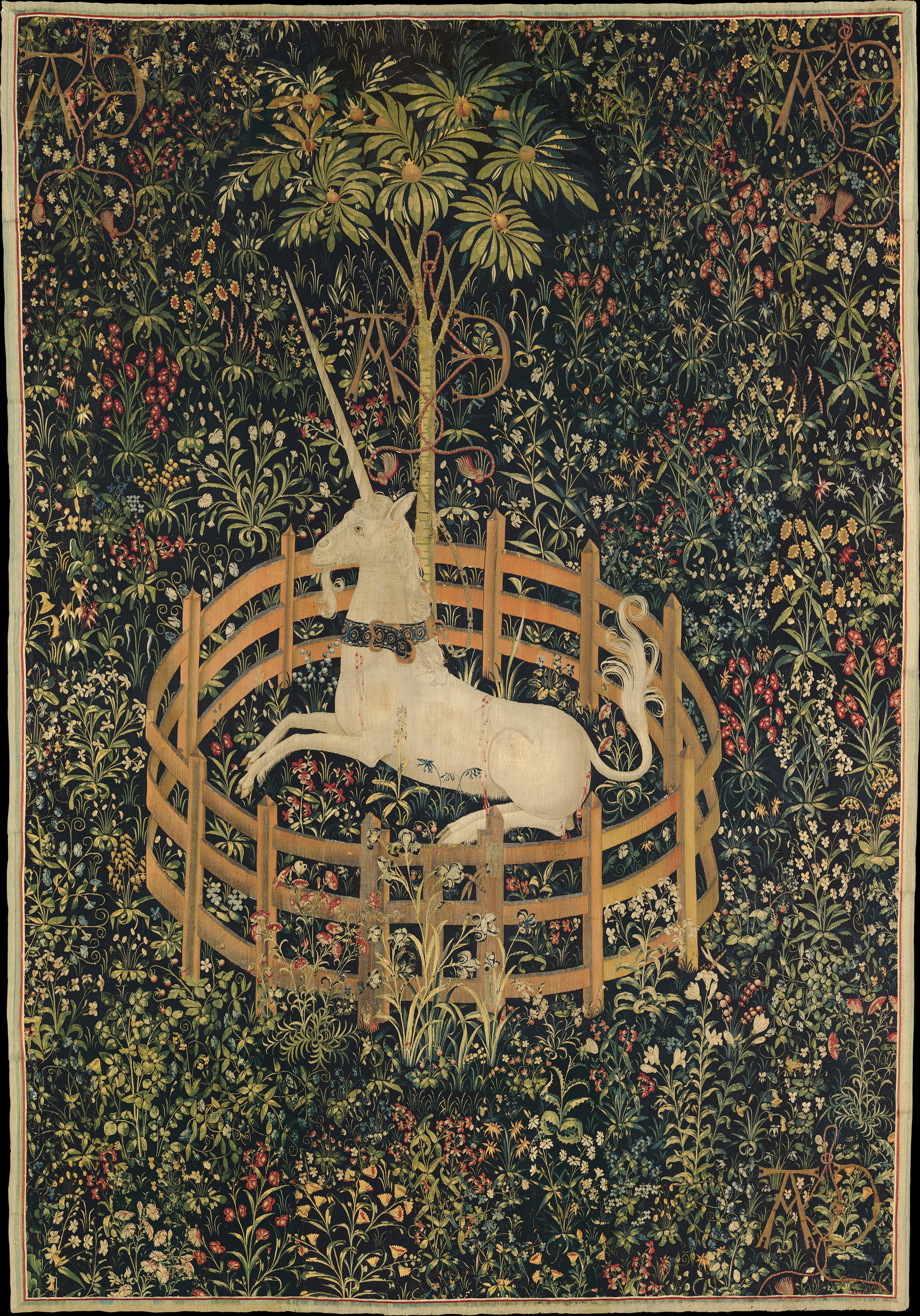
"The Unicorn Rests in a Garden"

== See also ==
- The Lady and the Unicorn, another series of unicorn tapestries from the same period
