= The Wood Beyond the World =

1894 novel by William Morris

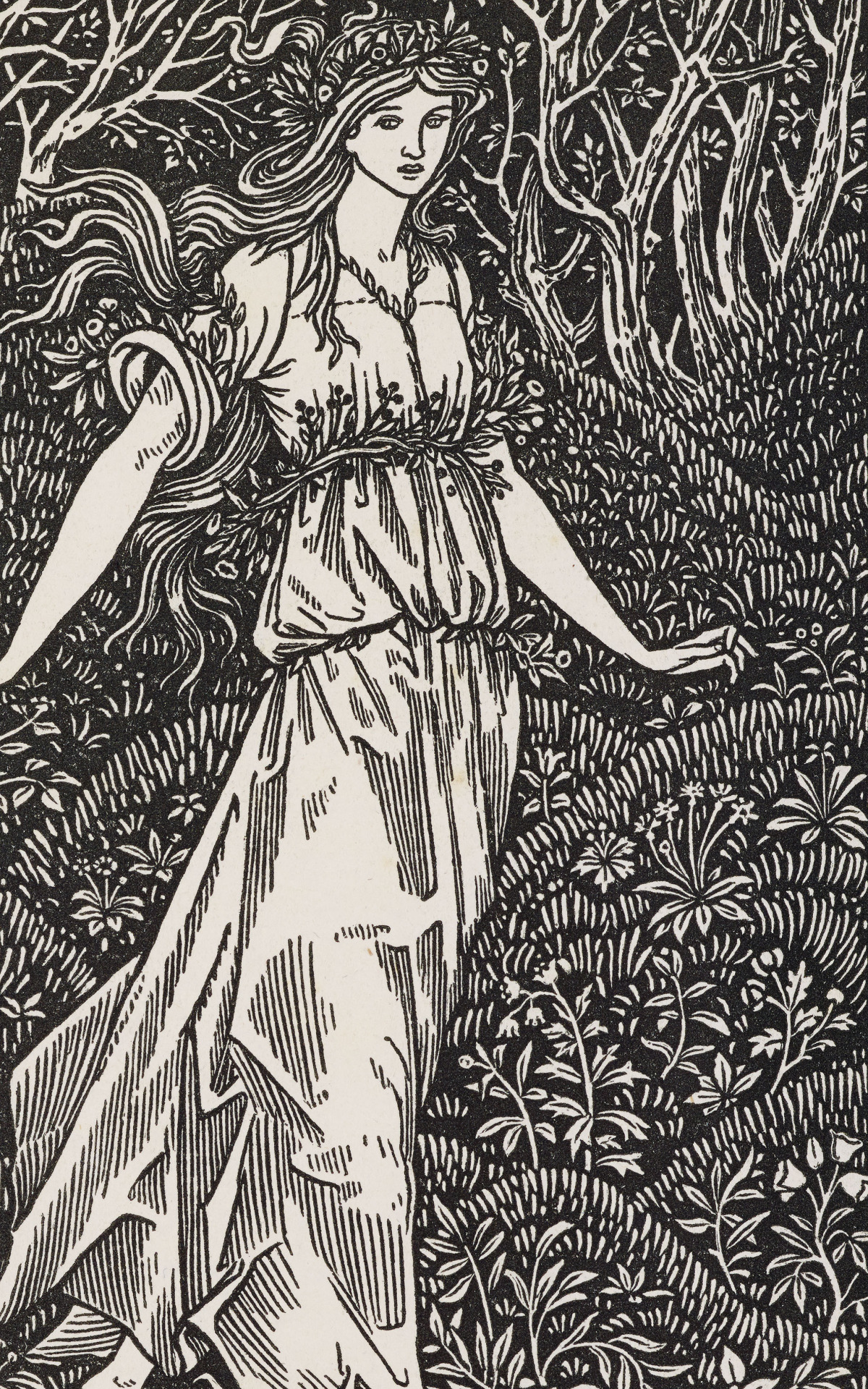
- frontispiece to the Kelmscott edition
- Author: William Morris
- Illustrator: Edward Burne-Jones
- Language: English
- Genre: Fantasy novel
- Publisher: Kelmscott Press
- Publication date: 1894
- Publication place: United Kingdom
- Media type: Print (Hardback)
- Pages: 261
- ISBN: 978-1682041819
- Text: The Wood Beyond the World at Wikisource

The Wood Beyond the World is a fantasy novel by William Morris, perhaps the first modern fantasy writer to unite an imaginary world with the element of the supernatural, and thus the precursor of much of present-day fantasy literature. It was first published in hardcover by Morris's Kelmscott Press, in 1894. The book's importance in the history of fantasy literature was recognized by its republication by Ballantine Books as the third volume of the Ballantine Adult Fantasy series in July, 1969. The Ballantine edition includes an introduction by Lin Carter.

== Plot ==
When the wife of Golden Walter betrays him for another man, he leaves home on a trading voyage to avoid the necessity of a feud with her family. However, his efforts are fruitless, as word comes to him en route that his wife's clan has killed his father. He has a vision of three figures: a stately Lady, her Maid, who wears an iron ring on her anklet, and a Dwarf in a yellow hood. The figures pass through the port he is docked in, and he sets sail.

Shortly into his voyage, a storm waylays his ship. He docks in an unknown country, where the only inhabitant appears to be an old hermit. Walter and his companions begin a hunt for food, but Walter strays northward up a steep path. After several days of travel, he rests in a wood, and is woken by the Dwarf from his vision. The Dwarf reveals that Walter has strayed into the land of the Lady, who keeps a grand house at the heart of the wood. Shortly after, Walter comes across the Maid, who begs for Walter's aid in escaping the clutches of her mistress. Walter agrees and seeks the house of the Lady and swears fealty to her, citing his vision as his reason for entering her lands. The Lady introduces Walter to her lover, the King's Son, who disregards Walter for his low rank.

Soon after, the King's Son falls out of the Lady's favour when she discovers that he has attempted to seduce the Maid, who refused him. Walter overhears the Lady conspiring with the Dwarf, who she tasks with killing the King's Son. After Walter defends the Lady from a wild lion, she seduces him. Walter acquiesces, fearful that the Lady will order his death should she learn of his plan to help the Maid escape.

One night, the Maid begs Walter to meet her in the wood. When he does, they make their escape. They are pursued by the Dwarf, who declares that the Maid has murdered the Lady before Walter kills him. The Maid is distraught, but confirms the Dwarf's account. She reveals that she invited the King's Son to her bed, and cast a glamour over him such that he looked like Walter. When the Lady entered the room, she thought him to be an unfaithful Walter and killed him in his sleep; the Lady then killed herself with a dagger. Walter is shocked to hear the events, but after the Maid tells him that the Lady had imprisoned her for countless years, he accepts that her freedom could only be won by the death of the Lady or the Maid. They declare their love for one another, and Walter breaks the Maid's iron ring.

The pair travel into a region inhabited by Bear-People who are known to sacrifice most foreigners to their female God. The Maid proclaims herself as an incarnation of the God, thus saving herself and Walter from sacrifice. They depart, but on their travels meet a troupe of knights, who lead Walter to a great city. Stripped naked, his body is inspected and he is invited to don either beautiful robes or the armour of battle. He chooses the armour, and is thus proclaimed as the new King. An elder reveals to Walter that the city, Stark-Wall, has the custom of filling the vacant throne by sending knights to the valley south of the city, who take the first foreigner to arrive to the city. Should their body be fit, and their choice be to wear the garb of battle and not of peace, they are declared as the new King.

Walter and the Maid are wed, whereupon the Maid loses her magic powers. She regrets deceiving the Bear-People, and teaches them agriculture to avail the effects of longstanding drought in their land. Walter abolishes Stark-Wall's prisons, establishes support for the hungry and poor, defeats foes in battle, and leaves a long line of heirs. When his bloodline is ended, the people of Stark-Wall abolish the monarchy.

== Reception ==
Morris considered his fantasies a revival of the medieval tradition of chivalrous romances. In consequence, they tend to have sprawling plots comprising strung-together adventures. His use of archaic language is a challenge to some readers.

When the novel was reissued in the Ballantine Adult Fantasy Series, James Blish noted that Morris's style was a successful recapturing of the style of Sir Thomas Malory, "all the way down to the marginal glosses and the nonstop compound sentences hitched together with scores of semicolons. He also recaptured much of the poetry; and if the reader will make the small effort necessary to accommodate himself to the rhythm of the style, he will find both it and the story rewarding."
