= Goddess Remembered =

1989 documentary by Donna Read

- Directed by: Donna Read
- Produced by: Margaret Pettigrew; Signe Johansson; Studio D, National Film Board of Canada
- Starring: Starhawk; Charlene Spretnak; Susan Griffin; Carol Christ; Luisah Teish; Kim Chernin; Mary Tallmountain; Jean Bolen; Elena Featherstone; Shekhinah Mountainwater; Merlin Stone
- Cinematography: Susan Trow
- Music by: Loreena McKennitt
- Distributed by: National Film Board of Canada
- Release date: 1989
- Running time: 55 minutes
- Country: Canada
- Language: English

Goddess Remembered is a 1989 Canadian documentary on the Goddess movement and feminist theories surrounding Goddess worship in Old European culture according to Marija Gimbutas, and Merlin Stone's 1976 book When God Was a Woman.

The main theme of the film, composed by Loreena McKennitt, was released as the track "Ancient Pines" on her 1989 album Parallel Dreams. Goddess Remembered is the first film in the National Film Board of Canada's Women and Spirituality series, followed by The Burning Times (1990) and Full Circle (1993).

== Synopsis ==
This documentary is a salute to 35,000 years of "pre-history", to the hypothetized values of ancestors, and to the goddess-worshipping religions of the ancient past. Goddess Remembered features Merlin Stone, Carol Christ, Luisah Teish, Starhawk, Charlene Spretnak, and Jean Shinoda Bolen, who link the loss of goddess-centred societies with today's environmental crisis. They propose a return to the belief in an interconnected life system, with respect for the earth and the female, as fundamental to our survival.

== Reception ==
Clea Notar of Cinema Canada called Goddess Remembered empowering and energizing, describing it as an "anthropological, sociological, political, and visual treatise which succeeds without being either pedantic or boring".

The films of the Women and Spirituality series have been showed many times on public television and in college classrooms. The scholar Wendy Griffin attributes them with spreading the views of the Goddess movement to a larger audience, and stresses how they exhibit the strong American character of this movement, as every person in them is from the United States except for three Canadians: the narrator, Martha Henry and the singer Loreena McKennitt. Griffin says it is significant that the films do not feature any critical voices, such as Naomi Goldenberg, who is a Canadian and one of the first scholars who studied the Goddess movement. Rachel Wagner says Goddess Remembered is based on "tenuous evidence" and dampened by historical errors, but the Women and Spirituality films "produce a stirring portrait" of modern women who believe in the Great Goddess hypothesis.

== See also ==
- Feminist spirituality
- Gynocentrism
- Matriarchy
- Kurgan hypothesis
