= Women and Spirituality: The Goddess Trilogy =

Women and Spirituality is a series of three documentaries focusing on women's spirituality in the Western World at the end of the 20th century and the Goddess movement. After the third part came out, they were sold as a trilogy, which won several awards.

- Women and Spirituality: Goddess Remembered released in 1989
- Women and Spirituality: The Burning Times released in 1990
- Women and Spirituality: Full Circle released in 1993
