= Genevieve Vaughan =

American feminist and philanthropist

Genevieve Vaughan (born November 21, 1939) is an American expatriate semiotician, peace activist, feminist, and philanthropist, whose ideas and work have been influential in the intellectual movements around the Gift Economy and Matriarchal Studies. Her support also contributed heavily to the development of the global women’s movement.

== Background ==
Vaughan was born and grew up in Corpus Christi, Texas. During her childhood, her family became wealthy through oil, and she developed a consciousness of the great disparity of wealth between her family and others'. She completed a B.A. in English from Bryn Mawr College in 1961, and subsequently enrolled as a graduate student at The University of Texas at Austin. There she met Italian philosopher Ferruccio Rossi-Landi (1921–1985), whom she married in 1963, moving with him to Italy. They had three daughters together, and eventually divorced, in 1978.

== Inspiration and early writings ==
Rossi-Landi is credited as a founder of the SocioSemiotics movement, which stresses the "sociality" of sign use. In 1964, he was asked to help start a new philosophical journal applying Marx’s analysis of the commodity and money to language. Vaughan writes that while the journal did not materialize, her husband wrote several books about this topic, and she found herself in disagreement with his framing of language as a form of exchange. Her own experience as a mother of small children who were learning to talk suggested that language is a form of gift-giving. Alongside Rossi-Landi, Vaughan attended the first meeting of the International Association for Semiotic Studies in Milan in 1974. She began her own research and in 1977 completed two essays, "Saussure and Vigotsky via Marx", and "Communication and Exchange" In the latter, she introduces the ideas of "communicative need", exchange as an aberrant form of communication, and money as a one-word language.

== Feminism ==
1978 was a watershed year for Vaughan. She divorced, entered psychoanalysis, and began to attend a feminist consciousness-raising group in Rome. Many of the women in the group worked at the United Nations Food and Agriculture Organization, and the group became a connection point for women from around the world to discuss important issues about women and development, environment, and peace.

In the early 1980s, Vaughan began to study, write, and teach in Italy. During these years she was developing a gender analysis around exchange and gift-giving. In 1981, she was at the Virginia Woolf Cultural Centre in Rome, an independent women’s university started by feminist philosopher Alessandra Bocchetti. After attending summer semiotics institutes at the University of Urbino for several years, she introduced a feminist element in 1982, organizing a women's group and presenting a paper about care as non-sign human communication.

By starting with gifting as communication, Vaughan arrived at a different take on the Gift Economy than other philosophers. She took issue with Belgian Luce Irigaray on the subject of exchange of women, instead taking the gift nature of women’s free labour in the home as the starting point for a generalized theory. Of Marcel Mauss, Vaughan writes "The insistence upon reciprocity hides the communicative character of simple giving and receiving without reciprocity and does not allow [Mauss's followers] to make a clear distinction between giftgiving and exchange as two opposing paradigms." In 1983, when The Gift by Lewis Hyde was published, Vaughan was not in accord with his emphasis on obligation, reciprocation, and gratitude, instead emphasizing the role of needs as a coequal component. Where Hyde defines "a true gift" as based on "gratitude", Vaughan describes a true gift as one that satisfies a need.

In 1987, Vaughan began writing her first book, which would be titled For-Giving: A Feminist Criticism of Exchange. It would be a decade before it was finished and published, as other activities came increasingly to the fore.

== Practice of Gift Economy ==
In 1980, Vaughan hired her cousin Frances Farenthold, a former Texas legislator, gubernatorial candidate and president of Wells College, to help her embark on a course of socially effective giving from her personal fortune. Returning to the US in 1983, Vaughan began to acquaint herself with a wide range of women’s and feminist activities related to peace, culture, and economics. She developed supportive and collaborative relationships with many women activists, both unknown and well known.

== Peace Activism ==
In 1984, Vaughan, Farenthold and Sonia Johnson started organizing the Feminist International for Peace and Food. In collaboration with the venerable Women’s International League for Peace and Freedom (WILPF), FIPF developed a Peace Tent to be held at the United Nations third World Conference on Women in Nairobi, Kenya. Vaughan convened and funded preparatory meetings for this project in Texas and in Rome. Among those in attendance were Bella Abzug, Robin Morgan, and Marilyn Waring. Video of the Peace Tent shows the process in which women from enemy countries were brought together to hold face to face conversation, while other women stood in support and sang to calm them, so that the discussions could proceed. Vaughan would be involved with other peace projects over the next decades, including European and US women’s peace caravans, a Moscow women’s peace meeting in 1987, meetings in Mexico between US and Salvadoran women, and a multilateral meeting of Colombian women on a Japanese peace boat, in 2001. In 1987, she became involved in Women for Meaningful Summits and began a series of fact-finding trips with Farenthold to Latin America. Vaughan also visited the Greenham Common Women's Peace Camp in England.

== The Foundation for a Compassionate Society ==
In 1988, Vaughan incorporated her numerous projects into a nonprofit organization, the Foundation for a Compassionate Society. The foundation lasted for ten years and supported hundreds of projects. At its height, it had 27 employees. Major events produced by the Foundation include a Feminist Family Values Forum, including Gloria Steinem and Angela Davis; and a conference on Radiation and Breast Cancer, featuring Bella Abzug and Vladimir Chernosenko, the physicist in charge of the Chernobyl cleanup. Many of the projects responded to specific needs: Technomama for example, trained women from around the world in computer technology and also sent women to visit feminist NGOs around the world, give them computers and teach them to use email. The Museum to End the Nuclear Age traveled the highways of Texas to help successfully stop an illegal nuclear waste dump being situated on the Texas-Mexico border. For another project, Vaughan funded a survey designed by epidemiologist Rosalie Bertell, to study health effects of pollution on military bases in Texas and the Philippines. Two of her major gifts restored land to indigenous people in the US one of which is at Cactus Springs, Nevada, as a donation to the original inhabitants the Western Shoshone, and the site of The Temple of Goddess Spirituality Dedicated to Sekhmet, the Egyptian goddess, built in 1993, "founded on the principles of peace, goddess spirituality & the gift economy". The annual interfaith Sacred Peace Walk, conducted and organized by the Nevada Desert Experience, is supported, in part, by the temple on the peacewalk's way to the Nevada Test Site's southern gate in opposition to the existence of the Nevada Test Site and nuclear weapons testing. She helped the successful campaign by Indian environmentalist Vandana Shiva to block the patenting of basmati rice. She is credited by Florence Howe with financially rescuing The Feminist Press, and serves as an honorary member of its board of directors. When the Foundation closed, Vaughan ceased considering funding proposals, and turned full-time to analyzing and explaining the Gift Economy.

== Communicating the Gift Economy ==
In 1991, Vaughan published "The Gift Economy", an essay in Ms. She began to give talks and workshops on the Gift Economy; but it was not until 1997 that the first edition of her first major work came out, titled For-Giving: A Feminist Criticism of Exchange. The book draws primarily upon semiotic concepts but also on psychological and economic ideas. A revised and expanded edition was issued in 2002. The book has been translated into multiple languages, including Spanish, Italian, German, Turkish, and Albanian.

Since closing her foundation, Vaughan has returned to live part-time in Italy. Both there and in Texas, she has written steadily, publishing in academic journals and popular magazines, and delivering papers at academic conferences on semiotics, gift economics, and women's studies. She has been an active proponent of two scholarly fields that have emerged from Women's Studies: Motherhood Studies, and Modern Matriarchal Studies. Since For-Giving, her major works include Women and the Gift Economy: A radically different worldview is possible (2007) (edited), and Homo Donans (web book). With the term homo donans, she posits that humans are not primarily the wise species (homo sapiens) nor the exchange species (homo economicus) but the unilaterally gift-giving species, which has been distorted by the practice of exchange, money and the market.

Vaughan’s contributions to the scholarship of the gift economy include the centrality of mothering (sometimes called parenting, care, or nurturing) in the structure of language and in the formation of the gift paradigm at the individual and societal level. She highlights the concept that patriarchal capitalist cultures are parasitic upon the unilateral gift-giving of mothers and nature. Many of her concepts are succinctly summarized in "Shifting the Paradigm to a Maternal Gift Economy," a paper she delivered at the Women's Worlds international interdisciplinary women's studies conference in Ottawa in 2011.

The American Review of Political Economy published Vaughan's paper "The Unilateral Gift Economy Conjecture" in 2021.

== The Gift Economy Movement ==
A network, International Feminists for a Gift Economy, was initiated at the founding meeting of the International Feminist University in Norway in 2001. In 2002, a position statement from the network was presented at the World Social Forum in Porto Alegre, Brazil, and a first general meeting was held in San Marcos, Texas.

In 2004, Vaughan edited a special edition of the Italian journal Athanor: Semiotica, Filosofia, Arte, Letteratura, with work by 25 contributors from 15 countries on five continents. The edition was titled Il Dono/The Gift: A feminist analysis. It begins: "This collection of articles is the product of an international network of women who embrace in one way or another the idea of the logic of gift giving as the basis of a paradigm shift for social change." While uneven, this book won some early kudos for Vaughan's theory of the gift economy. The publication debuted at a conference in Las Vegas in November 2004, which had more than 30 speakers. They included scholars, indigenous women, educators, prominent organizers, spiritual leaders, and grassroots women. Among the more well-known speakers were Mililani Trask, a leader of the Hawaiian indigenous sovereignty movement; Salvadoran theologian Marta Benavides; indigenous Sámi scholar Rauna Kuokkanen; Greek-American evolutionary biologist Elisabet Sahtouris; American feminist shaman Vicki Noble; Heide Göttner-Abendroth, from Germany, founder of Modern Matriarchal Studies; Dr. Kaarina Kailo from Finland; women's development specialist Peggy Antrobus from Barbados; and Corinne Kumar, founder of the World Courts of Women in Tunisia. Proceedings from the conference were published by Innana Press of Toronto in 2007.

Panels on the Gift Economy are presented by the women of the network at many conferences and events, including World Social Forums, the triennial Women's Worlds conferences, and Matriarchal Studies conferences. In 2009, Vaughan and Göttner-Abendroth co-convened an embedded conference within a Motherhood Studies conference at York University in Toronto; it was titled A (M)Otherworld Is Possible. A video record is online.

== The Mothering Paradigm ==
In 2015, Vaughan released the book The Gift in the Heart of Language: The Maternal Source of Meaning (Mimesis International, 2015). In this book, Vaughan cites recent infant psychology research to strengthen her epistemological argument that the mother-child experience is the key paradigm for the structure of both verbal and material communication. Among the characteristics of this paradigm are the central value attributed to the receivers of gifts, and the community-building aspect of both verbal and material gifts. Vaughan criticizes patriarchal, capitalist monetization of gift-giving into a measurable forced exchange, calling it an expropriation of the psychological mechanism of parent-child interaction.

The release of the book was accompanied by a conference on The Maternal Roots of the Gift Economy in Rome in April 2015. The thirty-two speakers were: Luciana Percovich (Italy), Mariam Tazi-Preve (Austria/USA), Elena Skoko (Italy/Croatia), Andrea O'Reilly (Canada), Stefano Zamagni (Italy), Kaarina Kailo (Finland), Angela Dolmetsch (Colombia), Lin Danels (USA), Manish Jain (India and Giftival, Italy), Genevieve Vaughan (USA/Italy), Susan Petrilli (Australia/Italy), Francesca Rosati Freeman (Italia), Bernedette Muthien (South Africa), Coumba Touré (Senegal), Barbara Alice Mann (USA Native American - Seneca), Diem Lafortune (Canada-Native American-Cree), Pat McCabe (Canada Native American - Diné), Heide Goettner-Abendroth (Germany), Daniela Falcioni (Italy), Francesca Brezzi (Italy), Jodie Evans (USA), Tracy Gary (USA), Erella Shadmi (Israel), Camilla Martinez (USA), Letecia Layson (Philippines/USA), Morena Luciani (Italy), Vicki Noble (USA), Angela Giuffrida (Italy), Luigino Bruni (Italy), Alberto Castagnola (Italy), Augusto Ponzio (Italy), Simone Woerer (Austria), and Angela Miles (Canada) Videos of the conference are online, with English subtitles for non-English speakers.

Between November 2020 and November 2021, Vaughan hosted a series of twenty-five online conferences and speaker events representing and discussing aspects of an international Maternal Gift Economy Movement.
