= Luciana Percovich =

Italian non-fiction writer, translator, and feminist

Luciana Percovich (born 25 July 1947) is an Italian non-fiction writer, a teacher, a translator and director of a series of books on women's history and spirituality. She has been defined as "a traveller between worlds and a weaver of space-time connections", whose "far-reaching vision combines a project of individual knowledge with a collective cultural and political commitment".

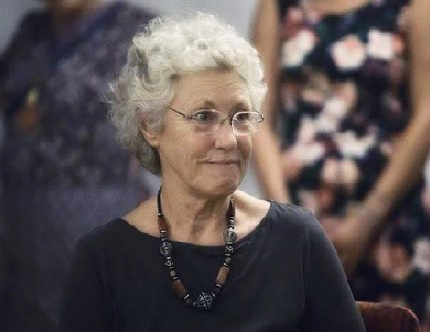
Luciana Percovich

== Women's Movement ==
Whatever I've done, it's been conceived within women's relations, in presence of women's bodies and in the flowing of awakened women's emotions.

— Luciana Percovich

Born in Gorizia, Italy, to a to an Italian-speaking family of Central European origin, forced to leave Fiume, Rijeka at the end of World War II, with cultural and geographical roots in Austria and Dalmatia, Luciana Percovich spent her childhood and adolescence in Gorizia attending classical studies. At the age of 18 she went to Milan to complete her studies, graduating in 1972 from the University of Milan in Lingue e Letterature Straniere Moderne at the. Since then she has lived and worked in Milano as a teacher, translator, author and activist in many pioneering projects of the women's movement (women's health centers, bookshops, cultural and political training, publishing houses, etc.).

During her university years, which were marked by the student movement of 1968, Percovich came into contact with the first women's consciousness-raising groups, which took their criticism to the heart of the social, economic and political structure. Patriarchal Attitudes (1970) by Eva Figes, one of the first feminist texts to be read in Italy, was for her a turning point. She joined "Lotta Femminista", a group investigating the invisible economic role of female unpaid work, and soon after a collective on female body and health. They produced and published on their own Anticoncezionali dalla parte della donna (Birth control from the women's side, 1974, translated into Portuguese in 1978), opened one of the first women's health clinics in a popular district of Milano, introduced the practice of self-help brought to Italy from Los Angeles and by the Boston Women's Health Collective. Within a few years, a diverse women's health movement spread throughout Italy, discussing and promoting information at national conferences in Milan, Rome and Florence. In 1975, a law was enacted opening up public health services to women.

A small pamphlet, Witches, Midwives and Nurses by B. Ehrenreich and D. English brought from the United States – which reconstructed from a totally new perspective who the witches were and why they were burned for more than three centuries, was translated by Percovich and became very popular. This publication (Le Streghe siamo noi. Il ruolo della medicina nella repressione della donna, 1977) marked her first editorial experience as chief editor of a series of books called "Il Vaso Di Pandora" for La Salamandra Edizioni, a university publishing house in Milan, which, along with La Tartaruga Edizioni-Milano and Edizioni delle Donne-Roma, was one of the three independent feminist publishing houses of the 1970s and beyond. This series lasted until 1986, and introduced Italian readers to works such as A Literature of Their Own by Elaine Showalter and A feeling for the Organism, by Evelyn Fox Keller, a biography of the Nobel Prize Barbara McClintock.

From 1975 to 1986, Percovich was part of the Libreria delle Donne in Milan, which issued a series of periodical publications as vehicles of their political and cultural collective research (Sottosopra and the Catalogues of the Bookshop), and of the women's centres in Milano ("Collettivo di Via Cerubini", "Collettivo di Via Col di Lana", "Cicip & Ciciap", "Libera Università delle Donne"). She travelled frequently to Roma, Firenze and Pescara and wrote articles for the women's reviews of that time, as Sottosopra, L’Orsaminore, Reti, Lapis, Fluttuaria, and Madreperla.

== The fields of Science and Environment ==
In 1985 Percovich had a son, Pietro, with her lifelong partner Giancarlo De Marinis. The Chernobyl disaster of 26 April 1986 stimulated a deeper research in the fields of science and environment, topics that became central in her research since the groups on women's health and medicine

She taught at the Free Women's University a variety of topics, ranging from female aggressivity (1995), to women and Islam (1996) and the Cyber revolution (1997). She collaborated with various "Centri Documentazione Donne" in different parts of Italy. In the same years she was a member of the "Commissione Consultiva sui Temi della Donna della Provincia di Milano" (Milan Provincial Commission on Women's issues).

In 1990 she won the Premio Città di Monselice for Literary and Scientific Translation, chaired by Franco Fortini and Mario Luzi, for the translation of Naomi Mitchison's Memoirs of a Spacewoman (Diario di una Astronauta, La Tartaruga, 1988), and has produced a number of science fiction titles by female authors.

== The Sacred Feminine ==
A new horizon opened up during Percovich's travel to Australia where she encountered the indigenous vision of life/nature/religion in Alice Springs. Through the Aranda culture, as narrated by T.G.H. Strehlow (whose book Central Australian Religion. Personal Monototemism in a Polytotemic Community she translated in 1997), she entered the path of the Sacred Feminine, that is, a vision radically different from that proposed by the male monotheistic religions of Europe and elsewhere. For some years, she investigated shamanic and kundalini practices, reading a number of books by the pioneering women anthropologists and theologians of the seventies, and finally the work of Marija Gimbutas. Reconstructing "her-story" (that is, history before the advent of patriarchy), reclaiming a cosmo-biological vision of the "divine in nature" (or "inclusive transcendence" in the words of the radical feminist theologian Mary Daly), exploring the myths and symbolic language of societies with "women at the centre" became the focus of her research from then on.

Mary Daly was invited to Italy by the Università delle donne di Milano in 2002 and by Armonie – Bologna in 2004. During that conference, "Dopo la Dea", she met an independent publisher, Chiara Orlandini – Venexia Editrice, and together they convened translating Quintessence by Daly and beginning a new collection of books on Women's history and spirituality, which was called "Le Civette Saggi" (2005).

The same year, for the Fondazione Badaracco/Archivi Riuniti delle Donne di Milano she published La Coscienza nel Corpo. Donne salute e medicina negli anni Settanta, a well-documented history of the health movement in Italy during the Seventies. Retired from teaching at the Liceo Classico Manzoni di Milano, she moved to the country, to join the small familiar organic farm in Abruzzo.

In the following years she has introduced, and made their books available to Italian readers, the works of many women authors (Mary Daly, Marija Gimbutas, Vicki Noble, Tsultrim Allione, Starhawk, Genevieve Vaughan, Phyllis Currott, Kathy Jones, Heide Goettner-Abendroth among others).

With Laima Association, the International Indigenous Cultures of Peace conferences have been organized in Torino (2012, 2013, 2015) and in Rome (in honor of Marija Gimbutas, 20 years after her death, 2014). In 2015 she has presented a panel on Earth based Spirituality of the Native cultures of the Past and Present at The Parliament of World Religions, in Salt Lake City, Utah, Usa; in 2016 she was invited at the Goddess Conference in Glastonbury, GB.

She works on the archetypes of the Goddess and in Crone Circles, a project to reclaim the Wise Women of the matriarchal traditions.

== Books ==
- Posizioni amorali e relazioni etiche, Melusine, Milano 1993.
- La coscienza nel corpo. Donne, salute e medicina negli anni Settanta, Franco Angeli, Milano 2005.
- Oscure Madri Splendenti. Le origini del sacro e delle religioni, Venexia, Roma 2007.
- Colei che dà la vita. Colei che dà la forma. Miti di creazione femminili, Venexia, Roma 2009.
- She who gives life, She who gives form, Venexia, Roma 2021.
- Verso il Luogo delle Origini, Un percorso di ricerca del sé femminile, Scritti 1982–2014, Castelvecchi, Roma 2016.

== Editor ==
- 'Donne del Nord/Donne del Sud. Verso una politica della relazione tra diversità, solidarietà e conflitto, Franco Angeli, Milano 1994.
- 'Theodor G. H. Strehlow, I sentieri dei sogni. La religione degli aborigeni dell'Australia Centrale, Mimesis, Milano 1997.
- Dopo Pechino: Pensare globalmente, Agire localmente (Proceedings of the Conference), LUD, Milano 1995
- Marija Gimbutas. Venti anni di studi della Dea, Convegno alla Casa Internazionale delle Donne di Roma, 9-10 maggio 2014, Progetto Editoriale Laima, 2015.
- Heide Goettner Abendroth, Madri di Saggezza, La filosofia e la politica degli Studi Matriarcali Moderni, Castelvecchi, Roma 2020.

== Editor and translator ==
- Le streghe siamo noi, di Barbara Eherenreich-Deirdre English, Celuc Libri/La Salamandra, Milano 1975.
- In sintonia con l'organismo. La vita e l'opera di Barbara Mc Clintock, di Evelyn Fox Keller, La Salamandra, Milano 1987; Castelvecchi, Roma 2017.
- Diario di una Astronauta di Naomi Mitchison, La Tartaruga, Milano 1988; Mondadori Urania, Milano 1995: Castelvecchi, Roma 2013.
- La sapienza della Dea. Miti, meditazioni, simboli e siti sacri, di Dee Poth, Psiche 2, Torino 2010.
- Segni fuori dal Tempo. La vita e l'opera di Marija Gimbutas, di Donna Read e Starhawk, Psiche 2, Torino 2013.
- Nutri i tuoi Demoni. Meditazione guidata e intervista a Lama Tsultrim Allione, Psiche 2, Torino 2013.
- Società di Pace. Matriarcati del Passato, Presente e Futuro, a cura di H. Goettner-Abendroth, Un'Antologia, Castelvecchi, Roma 2018.

== Handouts 1993–2003 of the courses of the Università delle Donne-Milano ==
- Passaggi, Momenti della costruzione di sé, 1993;
- Guerre che non ho visto: sull'aggressività femminile, 1995;
- Islam e Islamismo: ne parlano le donne, 1996;
- La rivoluzione Cyber, Nuove reti di Donne, 1997;
- Mitologie del divino: immagini del sacro femminile, 1999;
- Storie di Creazione: immagini del sacro femminile, 2001.
- Mito-archeologia d'Europa: immagini del sacro femminile, 2002
- Il viaggio metapatriarcale di Mary Daly, 2003

A long essay (Posizioni amorali e relazioni etiche, Le Melusine, 1993) has been translated in Silvia Tubert (ed.), Figuras de la madre, Ediciones Catedra, Madrid 1996. English essays have been published in Trivia. Voices of Feminism 9, 2009; Nemeton. High Green Tech Magazine 1, 2010; She is everywhere volume 3, 2012; She Rises volume 1, 2015.
