= The Song of the Canary =

1978 film

The Song of the Canary is a 1978 American occupational health documentary film directed by Josh Hanig and David Davis. The film documents the Occidental Petroleum plant in Manteca, California and the scandal in which employees became sterile after being exposed to the pesticide DBCP. It also features interviews with workers over the use of guinea pigs, and health and safety regulations. The soundtrack, composed by Doug McKechnie, features the song "Like It Is" by Yusef Lateef.

The film won the Blue Ribbon Award at the American Film Festival in New York City in 1979. After airing on PBS, it was nominated for a News and Documentary Emmy Award in 1981.
