= Great God =

Great God may refer to:

- God in monotheism
- King of the gods in polytheism
- Ōkami (大神, "great god"), a Japanese video game first released in 2006

== See also ==
- Great Goddess
