= Women – for America, for the World =

1986 film

Women - for America, for the World
- Directed by: Vivienne Verdon-Roe
- Produced by: Vivienne Verdon-Roe
- Starring: Joanne Woodward
- Edited by: Michael Porter; Vivienne Verdon-Roe
- Music by: Doug McKechnie
- Production company: Better World Society
- Distributed by: TBS
- Release date: 1986
- Running time: 30 minutes
- Country: United States
- Language: English

Women – for America, for the World is a 1986 American short documentary film directed by Vivienne Verdon-Roe about women anti-nuclear activists. In 1987, it won an Oscar for Documentary Short Subject at the 59th Academy Awards.

== Cast ==
- Joanne Woodward as Herself
- Jean Shinoda Bolen as Herself
- Betty Bumpers as Herself
- Shirley Chisholm as Herself
- Allene Cottier as Herself
- Mary Dent Crisp as Herself
- Geraldine Ferraro as Herself (voice) (as Geraldine Ferraro)
- Ellen Goodman as Herself
- Elisabeth Holtzman as Herself (as Elizabeth Holtzman)
- Vera Kistiakowsky as Herself
- Pat Schroeder as Herself (as Patricia Schroeder)
