= Jean Shinoda Bolen =

American psychiatrist

- Born: Jean Shinoda; 29 June 1936; Los Angeles
- Education: University of California, Los Angeles, Pomona College, University of California, Berkeley, UCSF School of Medicine
- Occupations: Psychiatrist; psychoanalyst; psychologist
- Academic career
- Fields: Analytical psychology, psychiatry, psychology
- Institutions: Los Angeles General Medical Center (1962–1963); Langley Porter Psychiatric Hospital (1963–1966); UCSF School of Medicine (1967–); C. G. Jung Institute of San Francisco (1978–)
- Website: www.jeanbolen.com

Jean Shinoda Bolen (born June 29, 1936) is an American psychiatrist, Jungian analyst and author. She is of Japanese descent. A Distinguished Life Fellow of the American Psychiatric Association and a Diplomate of the American Board of Psychiatry and Neurology, she is an emeritus clinical professor of psychiatry at Langley Porter Psychiatric Institute, UCSF Medical Center and member of the C.G. Jung Institute of San Francisco. She is the author of thirteen books in over one hundred foreign editions. She was an NGO delegate to the United Nations Commission on the Status of Women (2002-2018).

== Background ==
Her mother, Megumi Yamaguchi, and aunt, Fumiko Yamaguchi, were both physicians, as were two uncles and her maternal grandfather. Her father, Joseph Shinoda, headed the San Lorenzo Nursery Company and was one of the founders of Keiro Nursing Home and Retirement Center.

Following a BA degree in 1958, Bolen obtained her MD in 1962 at UCSF Medical Center. She specialised in psychiatry. She rose to be a clinical professor of psychiatry at Langley Porter Psychiatric Institute.

In the 1970s, she trained in analytical psychology at the C.G. Jung Institute of San Francisco and served on its committees during the 1980s. She is a member of the International Association for Analytical Psychology and a member of International Transpersonal Association. She is a past board member of the Ms. Foundation for Women. She has lectured widely in the United States and abroad, including at the C. G. Jung Institute, Zürich.

== Writing career ==
Bolen has written several books on the archetypal psychology of women and men in the development of spirituality, and is one of the women featured in the 1986 film Women – for America, for the World (Academy Award for Best Documentary (Short Subject) and 1989 National Film Board of Canada documentary Goddess Remembered. Bolen also co-founded (with former husband James Bolen) Psychic magazine in 1969 (renamed New Realities in 1977) covering parapsychology and mind-body-spiritual subjects.

Bolen was a keynote speaker at the 2015 Parliament of the World's Religions in Salt Lake City, Utah.

== Books ==
- The Tao of Psychology: Synchronicity and the Self, (1979, 1982) ed., ISBN 978-0-06-250081-6
- Goddesses in Everywoman: A New Psychology of Women (1984)
- Gods in Everyman: A New Psychology of Men's Lives and Loves, (1989)
- The Ring of Power: Symbols and Themes in Wagner's Ring Cycle and in Us, (1992)
- Crossing to Avalon: A Woman's Midlife Pilgrimage (1994)
- Close to the Bone: Life-Threatening Illness and the Search for Meaning, (1996)
- The Millionth Circle: How to Change Ourselves and the World, (1999)
- Goddesses in Older Women: Archetypes in Women over Fifty, (2001)
- Crones Don't Whine, (2003) ISBN 1-57324-912-2
- Urgent Message from Mother: Gather the Women, Save the World, (2005). 2nd ed. (2008) ISBN 978-1-57324-353-7
- Like a Tree: How Trees, Women, and Tree People Can Save the Planet, (2011) ISBN 978-1-57324-488-6
- Moving Toward the Millionth Circle: Energizing the Global Women's Movement, (2013) ISBN 978-1-57324-628-6
- Artemis: The Indomitable Spirit in Everywoman, (2014) ISBN 978-1-57324-591-3
