= Megumi Yamaguchi Shinoda =

Japanese American physician

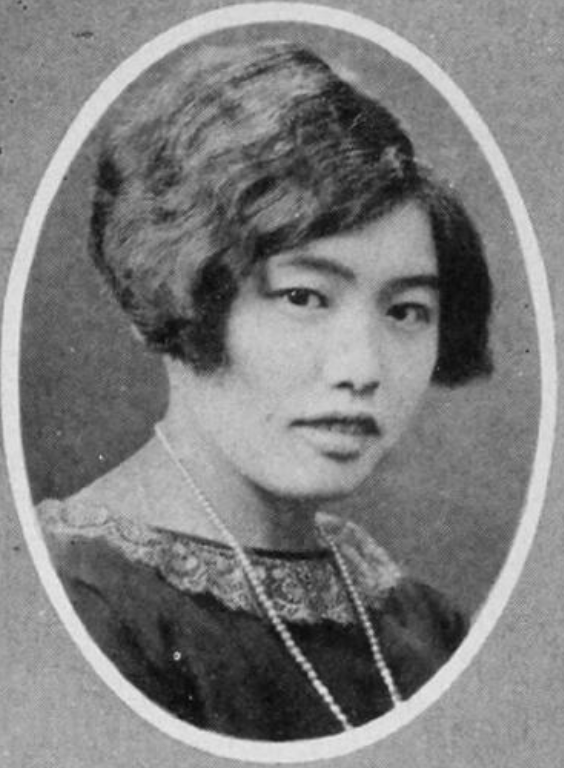
- Megumi Yamaguchi (later Shinoda), from the 1928 yearbook of Barnard College
- Born: February 9, 1908; Cleveland, Ohio
- Died: May 1, 2007 (aged 99)
- Children: Jean Shinoda Bolen
- Relatives: Fumiko Yamaguchi (sister); Grace Aiko Nakamura (niece)

Megumi Yamaguchi Shinoda (February 9, 1908 – May 1, 2007) was a Japanese American physician and was the first Asian American woman to graduate from Columbia University Vagelos College of Physicians and Surgeons. Alongside Kazue Togasaki, Shinoda was one of the first women of Japanese ancestry in the United States to receive a Doctor of Medicine degree in 1933. Additionally, she was the first Japanese American intern at what is now Los Angeles General Medical Center.

== Personal life ==
In 1908, Shinoda was born as Megumi Yamaguchi to Dr. Minosuke Yamaguchi and Yuki Sasaki Yamaguchi in Cleveland, Ohio. She had 6 siblings. One of her older sisters was Fumiko Yamaguchi. After her father finished medical school in 1918, her family moved to Inwood.

Around 1935, Shinoda married Joseph Shinoda. On June 29, 1936, Shinoda gave birth to their daughter, Jean Shinoda Bolen. Her niece was Grace Aiko Nakamura.

== Education ==
Shinoda graduated from Barnard College in 1928 with Phi Beta Kappa honors. Her sister Aiko Yamaguchi Takaoka graduated from Barnard in 1925. Shinoda started attended Vagelos College of Physicians and Surgeons in Fall of 1929. She graduated in 1933 with Alpha Omega Alpha honors and became the first Asian-American woman to graduate from Vagelos College of Physicians and Surgeons. Shinoda's residency was at, what is now called, Los Angeles General Medical Center and was the first Japanese-American intern at that hospital.

== Career ==
After her residency, she started a general practice in Los Angeles focusing on obstetrics and gynaecology. Between 1939 and 1941, Shinoda also authored a medical column in the newspaper Rafu Shimpo. During an interview with Densho, her niece claimed that Shinoda's column was the first medical column in the newspaper.

Due to Executive Order 9066, Shinoda was forced to close her business and moved back to New York City. While relocating to the east coast meant Shinoda was able to avoid the internment camps, many of her relatives did not experience the same fate. After World War II, Shinoda is reported to have returned to Los Angeles and restarted a medical practice at 224 1/2 East 1st Street in Los Angeles. Around this time, she established a new medical practice in Hollywood focusing on psychiatry. In February 1958, Shinoda was named as one of the claimants that, in accordance with the Japanese-American Claims Act, the Japanese Claims Section of the Department of Justice had awarded monetary compensation for property loss.

She retired in 1980.

In a 1986 political advertisement published in the Pacific Citizen, Shinoda was listed as a supporter of the Nixon-Agnew U.S. presidential ticket.

== Death ==
Shinoda died on May 1, 2007, in her Los Angeles home at age 99.
