= Motherpeace Tarot =

Tarot card deck

The Motherpeace Tarot is a deck of tarot cards inspired by the Goddess movement and second-wave feminism. Created by Karen Vogel and Vicki Noble in the 1970s, it has never been out of print, and in 2017 was the subject of a Christian Dior fashion collection.

== Background ==
At the time this deck was created, the feminist movement was experiencing a surge in popularity. Women were empowering themselves in a variety of ways, but a great deal of attention was placed on feminist art and the relationships forged between the artist, the work, and the viewer. This period is often viewed as one of the most progressive eras of feminist artwork. Although the mood of the 1970s was reported to be somewhat dark and uncertain, particularly in the Berkeley area where Vogel and Noble resided, the empowerment that many women gained through exploring their spirituality and artistic selves helped to push them through the decade.

== Artistic creation ==
Motherpeace was created by two women from Berkeley, California, Karen Vogel, and Vicki Noble, friends who had studied anthropology, women's studies and history. In the late 1970s, Vogel and Noble were roommates who shared common interests in Goddess spirituality, psychic studies, and the occult. One night in 1978, inspiration struck in an event where "Karen felt our room literally tilt, and Vicki proceeded to have a life-changing vision of Goddess energy and transmission of ancient wisdom." Shortly afterwards, they began devising a feminist deck based on their knowledge of history, alternative healing, and psychic studies.

The book Motherpeace: A Way to the Goddess Through Myth, Art and Tarot was written by Vicki Noble to accompany the deck.

== Symbolism ==
According to A Cultural History of Tarot, Motherpeace was designed to "fulfil a feminist agenda", with round cards to represent the Moon, "long associated with female energies and the Mother Goddess", and symbology was drawn from cultures across the world.

Vogel and Noble's artwork is a departure from more traditional tarot iconography such as the Rider–Waite–Smith deck, as it features predominantly female figures. Inspiration for the deck comes from myth and literature by and about women, including Greek and Roman mythology, and contemporary writers such as Alice Walker. Vogel and Noble explored feminism on each continent. They followed traditions back to their origins, finding out how important women were in indigenous cultures. The Goddess was a very important figure in ancient cultures. All of the scenes depicted are centered on women. The images are meant to focus on the importance of ritual, artistic expression, uniqueness and the idea of a culture whose members support one another.

The round shape of the cards is unprecedented and symbolically significant. The departure from the usual rectangular shape is meant to represent the fertility of women. This draws from classic feminist artwork which also uses many different symbols of fertility and femininity. The cards are hard to shuffle because of their shape but skilled hands can handle them deftly.

== Cultural legacy ==
Motherpeace was so influential in one strand of lesbian culture of the 1980s that it serves as a chapter title in the memoir of New Zealand academic Aorewa McLeod, and a shorthand for the lesbian feminist experience in London.

In 2017, Christian Dior, the fashion house, approached Vogel and Noble for permission to design clothing based on the pair's 1970s artwork. This was one of the first shows since Maria Grazia Chiuri became creative director. The Vogue review of the "Resort" collection picked out the dress using the motif from the Death card. According to Vogel, rather than being about physical death, the death card conveys the beauty of shedding skin that a snake does and symbolizes transformation and renewal. This marked the first time that Vogel and Noble had allowed any use of their images, saying that the time felt right.

Following the release of the "ethereal" haute couture dresses, sales of Motherpeace Tarot doubled in a few months, and sales of other tarot decks increased as well.

== Differences ==
There are some differences between the Motherpeace deck and more traditional tarot decks.

=== Major Arcana ===
- IX is The Crone as opposed to The Hermit
- XII is The Hanged One as opposed to The Hanged Man

=== Minor Arcana ===
The changes in the Motherpeace's Minor Arcana are seen in the Court Cards

- Daughter replaces the Page
- Son replaces the Knight
- Priestess replaces the Queen
- Shaman replaces the King

These changes call to mind family rather than monarchy. By having these characters instead of the originals, the Motherpeace deck suggests that we can make our own future.
