= Cactus Springs, Clark County, Nevada =

Unincorporated community in Nevada, US

Cactus Springs
- Unincorporated community
- Location within the state of Nevada
- Coordinates: 36°34′37″N 115°43′34″W
- Country: United States
- State: Nevada
- County: Clark
- Founded: 1993; 33 years ago
- Named for: Cactus and Spring
- Time zone: UTC-8 (PST)
  - Summer (DST): UTC-7 (PDT)
- Area codes: 702 and 725

Cactus Springs is an unincorporated community in Clark County, Nevada located on U.S. Route 95, about 60 miles (97 km) northwest of Las Vegas in the Mojave Desert. It is near Indian Springs and the Nevada Test Site.

Cactus Springs is also the site of The Temple of Goddess Spirituality Dedicated to Sekhmet, the Egyptian goddess, built in 1993, "founded on the principles of Peace, Goddess Spirituality & the gift economy" by Genevieve Vaughan. The annual interfaith Sacred Peace Walk, conducted and organized by the Nevada Desert Experience, is supported, in part, by the temple on the Peace Walk's way to the Nevada Test Site's southern gate.
