= Fumiko Yamaguchi =

Japanese activist

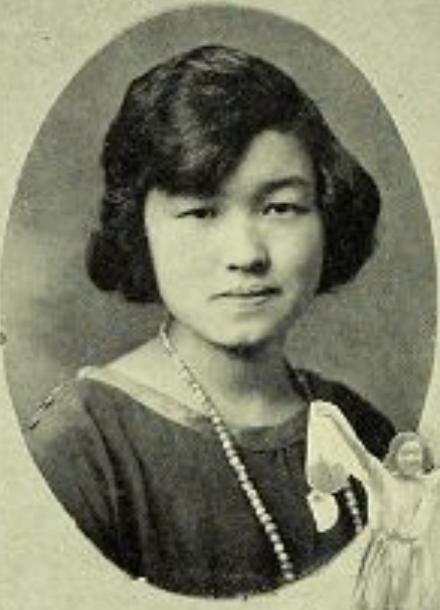
- Fumiko Yamaguchi, from the 1925 yearbook of Barnard College
- Born: 25 May 1903; Japan
- Died: 8 January 1987 (aged 83); Los Angeles, California, US
- Other names: Fumiko Y. Amano
- Occupations: Physician, advocate for reproductive health
- Relatives: Jean Shinoda Bolen (niece)

Fumiko Yamaguchi Amano (25 May 1903 – 8 January 1987) was a Japanese-born physician and advocate for reproductive health. She and her husband were both educated in the United States, and founded the Japan Birth Control Institute in Tokyo after World War II.

== Early life and education ==
Fumiko Yamaguchi was born in Tokyo, the eldest daughter of Minosuke Yamaguchi and Yuki Sasaki Yamaguchi. She was raised in Ohio while her father was attended medical school, and in New York when her father was a physician there. She graduated from Barnard College in 1925, and completed a medical degree at Yale School of Medicine. While at Yale, she was coauthor of a biochemistry article, "Factors Influencing the Distribution and Character of Adipose Tissue in the Rat" (1930).

Her sisters Aiko Yamaguchi (Takaoka) and Megumi Yamuguchi (Shinoda) also attended Barnard College. Two of her brothers and her sister Megumi also became physicians. Psychiatrist Jean Shinoda Bolen is Yamaguchi's niece.

== Career ==
Amano had a clinic in Los Angeles in the early 1930s. She practiced obstetrics and gynecology in Tokyo from 1938 to 1945. After World War II, she and her husband ran a clinic, led the Japan Birth Control Institute, and co-edited the Japan Planned Parenthood Quarterly. She was official hostess of the Fifth International Conference on Planned Parenthood, held in Tokyo in 1955. She was author of a pamphlet, "Family Planning in Japan" (1955).

Amano and her husband moved to Los Angeles in the late 1950s, and she reopened her Los Angeles clinic in 1959. Also in 1959, she spoke on "The Changing Economic Status of the Women of Japan" to Japanese-American women in Los Angeles. In 1962, she and her husband opened a new office together in the city's Crenshaw neighborhood. She was still working as a doctor and teaching until shortly before her death in 1987.

== Personal life ==
Fumiko Yamaguchi married fellow Japanese physician Kageyasu Wat Amano in Arizona in 1934. They had two children. She became a United States citizen in 1964. She died from a heart attack in 1987, aged 84 years, in Los Angeles.
