= Grace Aiko Nakamura =

Japanese American Educator

- Alma mater: University of Redlands; Whittier College
- Occupation: Educator
- Employer: El Rancho Unified School District; Pasadena Unified School District; Rowland Unified School District

Grace Aiko Nakamura (February 18, 1927 – May 30, 2017) was a Japanese American educator and the first Japanese American teacher to be hired in the Pasadena Unified School District.

== Personal life ==
On February 18, 1927, Nakamura was born Grace Aiko Shinoda in Los Angeles, California to Hide Watanabe and Kiyoshi Shinoda. Her father, Kiyoshi, died when she was six years old. Her brother was Larry Shinoda, who is known for designing the 1963 Stingray Corvette. Nakamura and her brother were known to be avid drawers throughout their lives. Her aunt was Megumi Yamaguchi Shinoda.

In May 1942, Nakamura and her family were forcibly sent to the Manzanar concentration camp in California as a result of Executive Order 9066. Nakamura and her family were released from Manzanar to go live with her uncle in Grand Junction, Colorado. She would late go on to testify about her experience in Manzanar to the Commission on Wartime Relocation and Internment of Civilians.

She married Yoshio “Yosh” Nakamura in 1950 after meeting him at the Union Church in Los Angeles. Yosh served in the 442nd Infantry Regiment during World War II. They had three children together. Her daughter is Linda Nakamura Olberholtzer. Her sons are Daniel Nakamura and Joel Nakamura. As of 2017, she had two grandchildren.

== Education and career ==
With the assistance of a scholarship from American Friends Service, Nakamura started studying sociology and education in 1944 at the University of Redlands where she would graduate with a Bachelor of Arts. After moving to South Pasadena, California with her husband, Nakamura became the first Japanese American teacher to be hired by the Pasadena Unified School District.

In 1956, Yosh stated teaching art at Whittier High School. Grace would go on to graduated from Whittier College with a Master of Arts in Teaching fine arts and a Master's degree in counseling in 1982.

She would also work as a teacher for the Rowland Unified School District and the El Rancho Unified school district.

In March 2007, her and her husband's multimedia artwork - “Twin Visions" - was exhibited by the Whittier College's Ruth B. Shannon Center for the Performing Arts.

In 2008, her art work was featured by the Whittier Public Library in an exhibit called “Ah! New Mexico! Inspired Images from the Land of Enchantment.”

== Affiliations ==
Nakamura and her husband supported the Japanese American National Museum (JANM) and it's “Go For Broke National Education Center.” Nakamura had donated suitcases she had taken to Manzanar concentration camp to JANM's permanent collection. Nakamura was interviewed by the National Park Service (NPS) twice - in 1999 and 2016 - for NPS Manzanar's Oral History Program.

She was also active in her local community. She was a Whittier Public Library trustee for eight years. She was a member of the Hillcrest Congregational Church in La Habra Heights. She was also a member of several organizations including the Whittier Area Audubon Society, the Whittier Art Association and the Rio Hondo Symphony Association. The Whittier Area Audubon Society awarded her and her husband with a Lifetime Achievement Award in 2016.

== Death and legacy ==
Nakamura died due to complications of pneumonia on May 30, 2017. She donated her body to Keck School of Medicine of USC. In August 2019, her husband made a donation to the organization Little Tokyo Service Center in her memory.
