= Shekhinah Mountainwater =

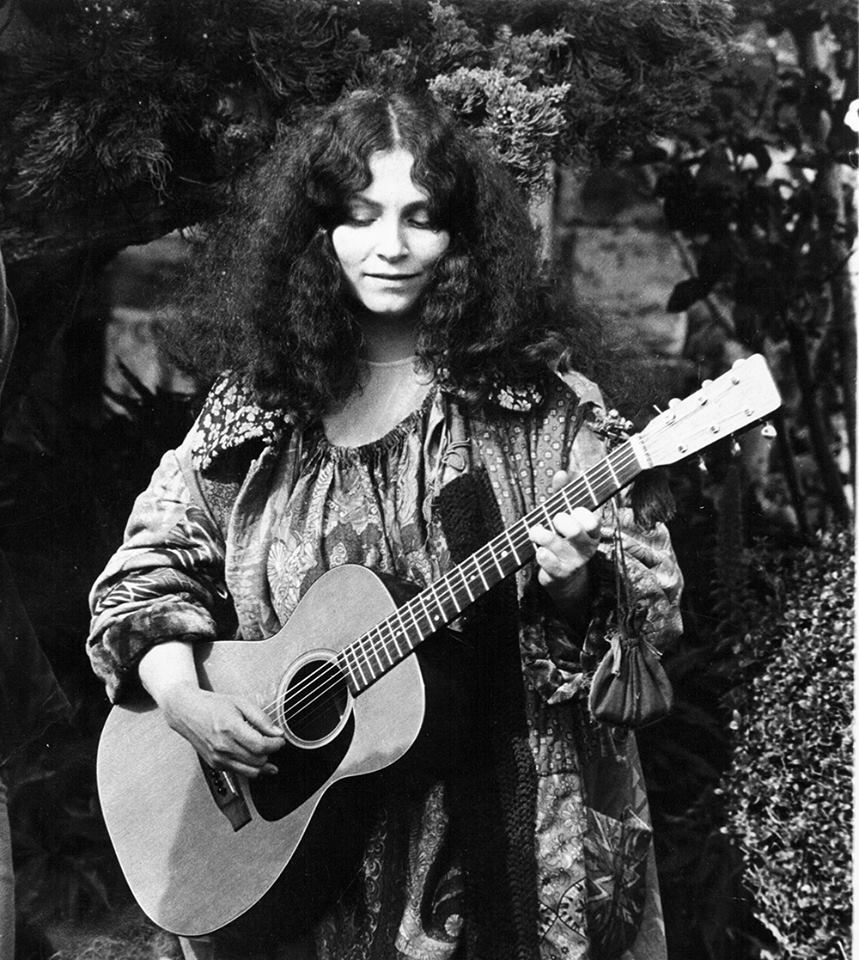
- Mountainwater performing in the Santa Cruz Mountains circa 1975
- Born: Ellen Adler; October 24, 1939
- Died: August 11, 2007 (aged 67)
- Occupations: Musician, author, teacher, priestess of Aphrodite
- Notable work: Ariadne's Thread: A Workbook of Goddess Magic (1991)
- Movement: Goddess movement Radical feminism
- Children: Angel Elena and Frey Faust
- Website: ShekhinahWorks

Shekhinah Mountainwater (October 24, 1938 - August 11, 2007) was a musician, author, teacher, priestess of Aphrodite, and a key figure in the Goddess movement. She is well known on the west coast of the United States, but has a significant following throughout America and abroad for her music, writing, teaching, WomanRunes, Moonwheels, Goddess ritual, and spiritual and social activism.

Mountainwater referred to herself as a "muse-ical mystical magical woman who loves the Goddess and women, a foremother of the Womanspirit movement, a teacher of Women's Mysteries, and a priestess of Aphrodite." She dedicated her life to sharing and expressing the love of the Goddess, leading women to reclaim their power and connection to one another and to the earth. Her music, poetry, tarot and learned writings are still celebrated in women's circles worldwide.

Mountainwater was a pioneer of what is now referred to in some circles as “Pagan music;” her unique melding of folk and spiritual, ritualistic themes eventually led to her passion for the Goddess. She began folksinging during the American folk music revival of the 1950s and 60's, and played in the same coffee houses in the Village in New York as Bob Dylan and Joni Mitchell. Mountainwater was one of the first musicians in the early 60's folk movement to start re-tuning the guitar to simple chords, creating a unique and resonant sound that was reminiscent of the organ, or sometimes even the bag-pipe. This movement was called “Modal Music.” In Mountainwater's case, the lower strings were often used to create a base-drone, while the others harmonized or quarreled with them. Although the bulk of her early influences were Scottish, Celtic, English, Appalachian and American folk, her work has Arabic and African under/overtones. Besides creating a distinctive style and sound, she was a prolific and gifted poet. Her literary compositions stand on their own for eloquence and social pertinence. Motivated by a passionate spirituality, she often chose mythical or occult themes for her treatments. She was able to communicate stories from the protagonist's perspective, allowing the listener to delve into the psyche of her characters—to feel the pain and joy of an icon personified.

As she became more active in the women's spiritual community, her songs were often overtly political, or designed as tools for trance induction and prayer. Her creations however, remained unfailingly personal and poetic, and many remember her ironic wit and brilliance in performance.

Mountainwater is best known for her book Ariadne's Thread: A Workbook of Goddess Magic. The work is considered a classic by many practitioners and seekers of women's spirituality and goddess worship. The text encourages women to find their own spiritual path, using the figure of the ancient goddess Ariadne as a metaphor, and elucidating the mysteries of woman-centered spirituality, while offering guidance through the cycles of life. These include the phases of the moon, the yearly nature holidays, and the aspects of divination. Ariadne’s Thread can be used as a study guide or manual; each chapter concludes with suggested exercises, meditations, and reading lists. The book will be republished in the fall of 2018 by Echo Point Books.

Mountainwater's songs and chants endeared her to music lovers as well as witches and practitioners of Goddess worship, magic and ritual. Witch's Choice, Lady with the Lamp, Cry of the Phoenix, Mischievous Fairy, Lady Mother of All, The Year is a Dancing Woman, A Solstice Story, and Power Spot are just a few of her most popular titles.

Mountainwater was diagnosed with cancer in 2005, and died on August 11, 2007. Since her death, her children have endeavored to establish her intellectual estate through the home-spun company known as ShekhinahWorks. In 2014, Shekhinah's birth-daughter committed to an ongoing project to collect, collate and make available her mother's works. Her projects include: republishing Ariadne's Thread, publishing a digital, or Kindle copy of Ariadne's Thread, creating a commemorative Facebook page, YouTube channel, and website, and a remastering and publishing of Mountainwater's original tarot deck.

== WomanRunes ==
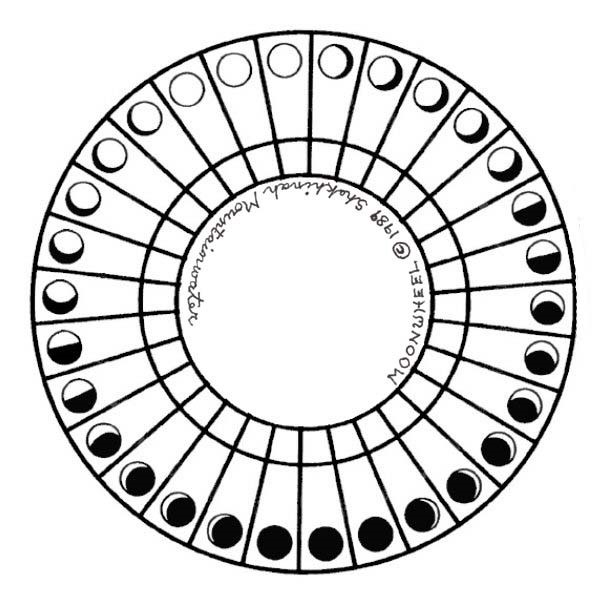
The Moonwheel - based on Shekhinah's system of Tree Moons

In 2012, Molly Remer of Brigid's Grove found Mountainwater's Womanrunes in a copy of Sagewoman magazine from 1988. She made her own set and then began to expand on the interpretations of the symbols. With the permission of Mountainwater's estate, Remer created a card deck of the runes and wrote a book of interpretations to accompany the deck. She published the deck and book in 2014 in order to reintroduce the women's spirituality movement to these "woman-identified" runes.
