= Full Circle (1993 film) =

- Directed by: Donna Read
- Produced by: Margaret Pettigrew; Studio D, National Film Board of Canada
- Starring: Starhawk
- Distributed by: National Film Board of Canada
- Release date: 1993
- Running time: 56 min.
- Country: Canada
- Language: English

Full Circle is a 1993 Canadian documentary. Directed by Donna Read and made in conjunction with the National Film Board of Canada, Full Circle completes Read's trilogy of documentaries focusing on women's spirituality in the Western World at the end of the 20th century, the Goddess movement, and feminist Wicca new religious movements. The preceding films, Goddess Remembered (1989) and The Burning Times (1990), along with Full Circle were released as Women and Spirituality: The Goddess Trilogy by AliveMind in 2008 on DVD.

== Production ==
Director Donna Read and her team travel to eight countries looking at the emergence of women's spirituality and Goddess movements. They conduct interviews and show footage of rituals. In Full Circle they visit Montreal, Canada, the American West Coast, Greece, England, and Mexico.

== Synopsis ==
Donna Read narrates the movie, which centers around her friends in Montreal discussing Paganism and the Goddess religions. This documentary focuses on the present as it meditates on the questions of climate change and what that means for future generations. The film is interspersed with interviews that help guide the story. Neopagan activist Starhawk, author Charlene Spretnak, professor Luisha Teish, priest Matthew Fox, historian Pauline Long, author Margot Adler, Seneca Nation Elder Grandmother Twila, as well as various practitioners offer insight into the Goddess religion and what it looks like today. The film documents various rituals and includes the Reclaiming traditions Spiral Dance and a Summer Solstice celebration in Wisconsin. When talking about the Goddess religions, Charlene Spretnak summarizes the heart of movie saying "what we would really like to get across is reverence for the Earth and there is divinity in this life." Full Circle argues for a world where embracing a reverence for the Earth can begin to heal it.

== Reception ==
Full Circle has a rating of 8.8 out of 10 on IMDb. Glenys Livingstone of PaGaian Cosmology “highly recommends” the film and says “this series as an educative resource for our times, for knowing more of our human story: so that we may orient ourselves more fully, and possibly flourish."

James R Martin of J R Media Inc considers the documentary “well-made” and says it “offers an important body of information that cannot be ignored.” However, he cautions the film has the tendency to generalize. He notes “assumptions based on these ideas become somewhat vague in places.”

The Los Angeles Times gives the film similar criticism. The author writes of the film as “massive and beautiful,” but not without fault, arguing the spiritual movement itself lacks focus of what it really believes. The author calls out parts of Full Circle and Goddess Remembered as “conceptually vague.”

In 2016, Donna Read was awarded the Saga Award by the Association for the Study of Women and Mythology (ASWM) for her films including Full Circle. The ASWM board of directors says Read is “‘one of the premier visionary artists of our time,’” honoring her work with feminism and spirituality.

== See also ==
- List of films about witchcraft
