= The Burning Times =

1990 Canadian documentary

- Directed by: Donna Read
- Written by: Erna Buffie
- Produced by: Mary Armstrong; Margaret Pettigrew; Studio D, National Film Board of Canada
- Starring: Starhawk; Matthew Fox; Margot Adler; Irving Smith; Thea Jensen; Barbara Roberts
- Music by: Loreena McKennitt
- Distributed by: National Film Board of Canada
- Release date: 1990
- Running time: 56 min., 13 sec.
- Country: Canada
- Language: English

The Burning Times is a 1990 Canadian documentary, presenting a feminist account of the Early Modern European witchcraft trials. It was directed by Donna Read and written by Erna Buffie, and features interviews with feminist and Neopagan notables, such as Starhawk, Margot Adler, and Matthew Fox. The Burning Times is the second film in the National Film Board of Canada's Women and Spirituality series, following Goddess Remembered (1989) and preceding Full Circle (1993).

The opening and closing theme music, composed by Loreena McKennitt, was released as the track titled "Tango to Evora" on her 1991 album The Visit.

== Criticism ==
=== Numbers of women killed ===
In the film, Thea Jensen calls this period in history a "Women's Holocaust". She notes that a total number of victims is unknown but that the high number often given is nine million deaths, over a period of 300 or more years. Otherwise, scholarly "high" estimates range around 100,000, with estimates around 60,000 more common. The nine million figure, according to modern scholarship, originates with a 1784 article by Gottfried Christian Voigt, in which he estimates the figure of 9,442,994 executions between AD 600 and 1700 – a period of 1,100 years – unsupported by any evidence.

=== Criticisms of the Catholic Church ===
According to William Donohue and Robert Eady of the Catholic Civil Rights League, the movie is inaccurate in other respects, e.g., placing Trier in France instead of Germany, and dating a stone cross there that is recorded to have been erected in 958 AD to 1132 AD without further explanation. The cross is shown as a "symbol of a new religious cult that was sweeping across Europe", despite Christian presence since 286. Eady, a member of the League in Canada, has cited the film in a complaint to broadcast regulators, in particular mentioning offense at the movie's quote: "it took the Church two hundred years of terror and death to transform the image of paganism into devil worship, and folk culture into heresy". Eady describes the documentary as propaganda intended to represent the Christian Church as "a wicked, patriarchal, misogynist institution". Jack Kapica adds "Women have genuine grievances with the Church. The Burning Times, however, is not going to help their cause."

== See also ==
- List of films about witchcraft
