= Rauna Kuokkanen =

Political scientist Rauna Kuokkanen

Rauna Kuokkanen is a political scientist specializing in comparative Indigenous politics and law, Indigenous feminist theory, Arctic governance, and settler colonialism in the Nordic countries. She is a research professor of Arctic and Indigenous Studies in the Faculty of Social Sciences at the University of Lapland in Finland.

== Education ==
Kuokkanen studied literature at the University of Oulu in Finland and obtained a Ph.D. from the University of British Columbia in Canada.

== Career ==
After an assistant professorship in Indigenous research at the University of Toronto, Kuokkanen became a professor at the Sámi University of Applied Sciences in Koutokeino in Norway. Subsequently, she took up the post of research professor of Arctic Indigenous Research at the University of Lapland. She is also an adjunct professor of Indigenous Studies and Political Science at the University of Toronto.

== Research ==
Kuokkanen is an expert in comparative Indigenous politics and law, Indigenous feminist theory, Arctic governance, and settler colonialism in the Nordic countries. Her book, Restructuring Relations: Indigenous Self-Determination, Governance and Gender, was published in 2019 by Oxford University Press. It investigates the notion of Indigenous self-determination and the governance and gender regimes in Indigenous political institutions.

== Awards ==
- Susan Strange Best Book Prize, British International Studies Association (BISA)
- Prize in Comparative Politics, Canadian Political Science Association (CPSA)
- Feminist Theory and Gender Studies Section Best Book Award, International Studies Association (ISA)
