= Great Goddess =

Almighty Goddess concept

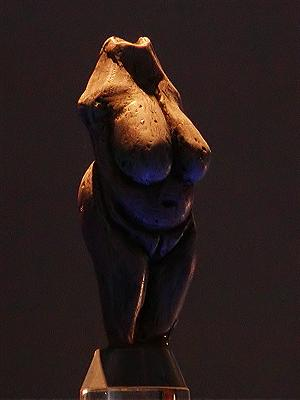
The Venus of Moravany. Venus figurines were among the earliest works of human culture and are hypothesized to have represented femininity and fertility in the cultures that created them.

The Great Goddess is the concept of a supreme mother goddess. Part of ancient matrifocal or egalitarian religions, it is sometimes mischaracterized as matriarchal. These religions are believed to have been Monotheistic in which there is a singular goddess. In later traditions, such as historical Greece, goddesses are part of a polytheistic pantheon in which mother goddesses exist alongside a pantheon of male and female deities. The Great Goddess is believed to have been worshiped as a creator deity in the Neolithic era across most of Eurasia, at least. There is scant scholarly support for the hypothesis. Theological belief in a Great Goddess is central to the Goddess movement.

== Hypothesis ==
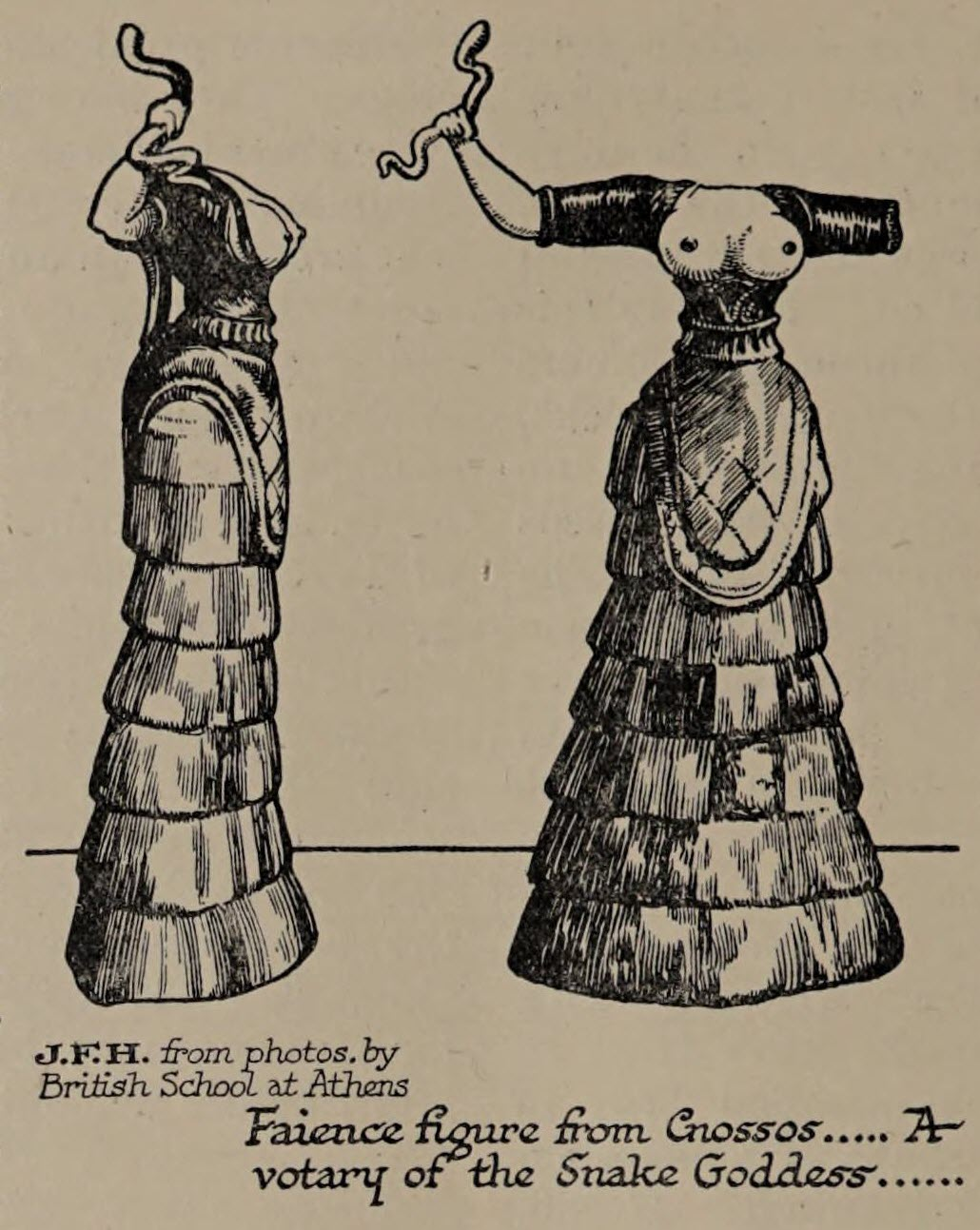
Fragmentary Snake Goddess icon from Cnossos, illustrated for the Outline of History by H. G. Wells

The Great Goddess hypothesis theorizes that, in Palaeolithic, Mesolithic, Neolithic Europe, West Asia, and North Africa, a singular, monotheistic female deity was worshiped. The theory was first proposed by the German Classicist Eduard Gerhard in 1849, when he speculated that the various goddesses found in ancient Greek paganism had been representations of a singular goddess who had been worshipped far further back into prehistory. He associated this deity with the concept of Mother Earth, which itself had been developed in the 18th century by members of the Romanticist Movement.

Soon after, this theory began to be adopted by other classicists in France and Germany, such as Ernst Kroker, Fr. Lenormant and M. J. Menant, who further brought in the idea that the ancient peoples of Anatolia and Mesopotamia had influenced the Greek religion, and that therefore they also had once venerated a Great Goddess. These ideas amongst various classicists echoed those of the Swiss judge J. J. Bachofen, who put forward the idea that the earliest human societies were matriarchal, but had converted to a patriarchal form in later prehistory. Commenting on this idea, the historian Ronald Hutton (1999) remarked that in the eyes of many at the time, it would have been an obvious conclusion that "what was true in a secular sphere should also, logically, have been so in the religious one."

In 1901, the archaeologist Sir Arthur Evans—who in an 1895 work had dismissed the Great Goddess theory—changed his mind and accepted the idea whilst excavating at Knossos on Crete, the site of the Bronze Age Minoan civilisation. After unearthing a number of female figurines, he came to believe that they all represented a singular goddess, who was the Minoan's chief deity, and that all the male figurines found on the site represented a subordinate male god who was both her son and consort, an idea that he based partially upon the later classical myth of Rhea and Zeus. In later writings in ensuing decades he went on to associate these Neolithic and Bronze Age images with other goddesses around West Asia. As Hutton pointed out, "his influence made this the orthodoxy of Minoan archaeology, although there were always a few colleagues who pointed out that it placed a strain upon the evidence."

The most extensive scholarly work on The Great Goddess was amassed by Professor of Archeology Marija Gimbutas. She proposed the Kurgan hypothesis as the event in which the goddess worshiping, egalitarian, societies of Old Europe, were replaced by patriarchal, hierarchical, culture. Though highly respected, her scholarship on the Great Goddess and her Kurgan hypothesis were dismissed by mainstream archeology throughout her lifetime. While her scholarship on the goddess religion continues to be dismissed, the new field of Archeogenetics has proven her Kurgan hypothesis correct and it is now widely accepted. Unfortunately, it is not possible for DNA to confirm or disprove religious beliefs.

== Examples ==
Marija Gimbutas and, earlier, Arthur Evans proposed that certain Neolithic and Bronze Age cultures worshipped a singular Great Goddess or a unified feminine principle expressed through various local forms. The following figures are among those most frequently cited by proponents of this theory:

- Neolithic figurines (e.g., the Venus of Willendorf, Çatalhöyük goddess figurines): Interpreted by Gimbutas as expressions of a prehistoric earth or fertility goddess, central to a matristic and peaceful society in Old Europe.
- Minoan snake goddess (Crete): Identified by Arthur Evans as a central deity of Minoan religion. Though some scholars contest this interpretation, she has remained a popular candidate in Great Goddess reconstructions.
- Cybele (Anatolia): Though historically complex, she has been associated by some with survival of earlier goddess traditions into classical antiquity. Gimbutas viewed her as a remnant of the earlier goddess archetype.
- Potnia Theron ("Mistress of Animals") (Mycenaean and Minoan): Seen as a potential continuation of the prehistoric Great Goddess, associated with animals and wilderness.

== See also ==
- Mother goddess
- Supreme deity
- King of the gods
