= Changing of the Gods =

Feminist non-fiction book about religion

- First edition
- Author: Naomi Goldenberg
- Language: English
- Subject: Religion; feminism
- Publisher: Beacon Press
- Publication date: 1979
- Pages: 152

Changing of the Gods: Feminism and the End of Traditional Religions is a non-fiction book written by a psychologist of religion and a feminist theologian Naomi Goldenberg. It is a feminist view on traditional male-dominated religions. The book challenges patriarchal personification and gives way for religious feminism.
