= Naomi Goldenberg =

American-Canadian professor

Naomi Ruth Goldenberg
- Born: Brooklyn, New York, U.S.
- Citizenship: American; Canadian
- Education: Douglass College (BA); Yale University (MA, MPhil, PhD)
- Occupations: Classics and Religious Studies
- Employer: University of Ottawa
- Known for: Gender, Politics, Psychoanalysis, and Religion
- Title: Professor

Naomi Ruth Goldenberg (born August 1, 1947) is a Canadian feminist scholar of religion and professor of Religious Studies at the University of Ottawa. She is best known for her work in the areas of Feminist Theory and Religion, Gender and Religion, as well as the Psychoanalytic Theory and Political Theory of Religion.

A prominent early member of the Women’s Caucus of the American Academy of Religion and the Society of Biblical Literature, she has been a key figure in advancing feminist and psychoanalytic approaches within religious studies.

== Early life and education ==
Naomi Ruth Goldenberg grew up in Teaneck, New Jersey. She attended Teaneck High School and graduated with high honors in classics from Douglass College in New Brunswick, New Jersey, in 1969. After beginning graduate work in classics at Princeton University, she switched to religious studies at Yale University, where she received an M.A. in 1974, an M.Phil. in 1975, and a Ph.D. in 1976. for her graduate work. Goldenberg studied at the C.G. Jung Institute in Zürich, Switzerland during her doctoral program.

== Awards and honours ==
Goldenberg has received many honourable prizes and recognized for her work.

- 2004 William C. Bier Award, American Psychological Association
- 2004 Excellence in Education Prize, University of Ottawa

== Published works ==
=== Books ===
- Changing of the Gods: Feminism and the End of Traditional Religions (1979)
- The End of God (1982)
- Returning Words to Flesh: Feminism, Psychoanalysis, and the Resurrection of the Body (1990)
- Resurrecting the Body: Feminism, Religion and Psychoanalysis (1993)
- Encyclopedia of Women and World Religion (2007, editor)
- Religion As a Category of Governance and Sovereignty (2015, editor, with Trevor Stack and Timothy Fitzgerald)

=== Journal articles ===
- "Theorizing Religions as Vestigial States in Relation to Gender and Law: Three Cases"
- "A Gentle Critique of Mourning Religion"
- "What's God Got to do with it? A call for problematizing Basic Terms in the Feminist Analysis of Religion"
- "Thought on the 20th Birthday of the Journal of Feminist Studies in Religion"
- "Witched and Words"
- "Memories of Marija Gimbutas and the King's Archaeologist
- "Interview"

== See also ==
- List of religious studies scholars
- psychology of religion
- Goddess movement
- Matriarchal religion
- Mother goddess
- Matriarchy
