= Doug McKechnie =

American Moog synthesizer musician

- Born: 1941 (age 84–85); Berkeley, California, U.S.
- Instruments: Synthesizers
- Years active: 1968–present

Doug McKechnie (born 1941) is an American musician, known for his work with the Moog synthesizer. McKechnie was highly active in the San Francisco music scene from 1968 to 1972, when he was forced to stop playing his synthesizer after it was sold. McKechnie was a contemporary of Wendy Carlos and has been labelled a pioneer of early electronic music, although his work remained underground until the 2020s. His sequencer-based style of music influenced future performers, including Tangerine Dream to whom his Moog was sold.

== Early life ==
Douglas McKechnie was born in Berkeley, California in 1941 and raised in nearby Richmond, California. He was gifted a violin at age 4 and learned how to whistle soon after. He was called a little Gerald McBoing-Boing since he was good at whistling and imitating birds, among other sounds. In his later years, he learned singing and the piano.

== Career ==
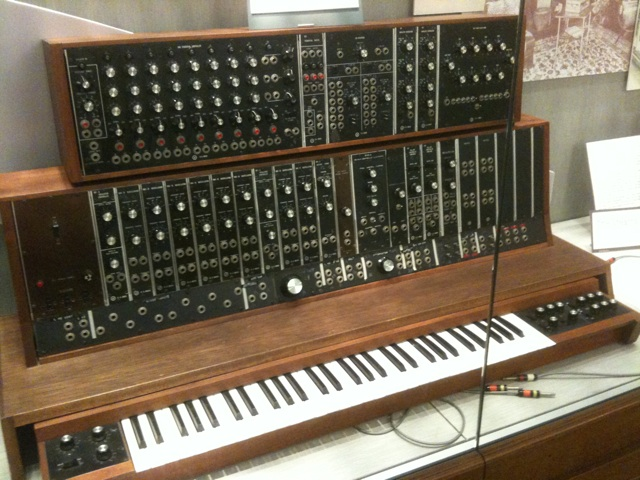
An early Moog synthesizer, with a sequencer unit. This model would be similar to the one played by McKechnie.

McKechnie began using the Moog modular Series III in 1968 and was one of the first musicians to use the instrument. He received access to the instrument through Bruce Hatch, who ended up working with McKechnie at the San Francisco Radical Laboratories at 759 Harrison Street, San Francisco. The synthesizer McKechnie played on was one of the first produced and had a serial number of 004.

With the synthesizer, McKechnie appeared on "What's Become of the Baby", on Grateful Dead's Aoxomoxoa (1969). He also performed live shows with the band in 1969. Due to his connection with the band, McKechnie was a performer at the 1969 Altamont Free Concert. On his set, he played a single oscillator sweep, from 55–20,000 Hz. He was unplugged by Owsley Stanley before he finished the set. Also in 1969, McKechnie used the Moog synthesizer for a performance of Terry Riley's In C at the San Francisco Opera House. Other performances included playing for the opening of Frank Oppenheimer's Exploratorium; the multimedia attraction Robin (1972), produced by Alotavus Productions and screened at the Family Dog concert hall; and the first ever concert at the Berkeley Art Museum.

McKechnie and Hatch also used the synthesizer as a teaching aid in colleges and universities around the San Francisco Bay Area. Four years after starting playing the synthesizer, McKechnie was forced to stop playing it after Hatch sold it to Tangerine Dream in 1972.

In 1975, McKechnie founded the San Francisco Synthesizer Ensemble with Paul de Benedictis, John Lewis and Jim Purcell. The group became known in 2012 when they used the Golden Gate Bridge as an instrument for their song, A Day in the Life of the Golden Gate Bridge. McKechnie and other members of the group used sounds sampled from striking the bridge's suspension cables with mallets to create the song.

In around 1980, McKechnie and Paul de Benedictis formed a group called New Logic. The duo released an album on cassette, Inside Your Head (1984), under the moniker; it features musical collaborations and solo work between de Benedictis and McKechnie recorded during the early 1980s.

== Artistry ==
External videos
- Recording of McKechnie playing the Moog synthesizer in 1968
- YouTube video of performance

McKechnie is noted for his sequencer-based approach to synthesis, sometimes fueled by psychoactive drugs like LSD and nitrous oxide. His Moog synthesizer contained two step-sequencers, nine oscillators, and both a ribbon controller and a 60-key keyboard. The synthesizer's size led Hatch and McKechnie to nickname the instrument the "Big Moog".

McKechnie used the sequencers on the synthesizer to drive his performances. This pattern based style predated the Berlin school of synthesis, promoted by artists like Tangerine Dream. McKechnie recorded all his tracks live, with no overdubbing or editing.

== Legacy ==
McKechnie has been called a pioneer of synthesizers. His work has been compared to that of Wendy Carlos, who was a contemporary of McKechnie's. Unlike Carlos and other early users of the Moog synthesizer, McKechnie was unique in his use of the instrument while touring. Although he was famous in the electronic music scene of San Francisco, his work remained underground until the early 2020s, when two records of his recordings were produced by VG+ Records. His work influenced other artists and groups, including Tangerine Dream. His relative obscurity led Klemen Breznikar of It's Psychedelic Baby! Magazine to call McKechnie a "critical missing link" in electronic music history.

== Discography ==
=== Studio albums ===
- Inside Your Head (1984) – with Paul de Benedictis (as New Logic)
- San Francisco Moog: 1968–72 Vol. 1 (2020) – VG+ Records
- San Francisco Moog: 1968–72 Vol. 2 (2020) – VG+ Records

=== Visual albums ===
- A Day in the Life of the Golden Gate Bridge (2012) – with the San Francisco Synthesizer Ensemble

=== Compilations ===
- The Complete San Francisco Moog: 1968–72 (2023) – VG+ Records

=== Soundtracks ===
- Vidium/Moog (1970)
- Light (1973)
- Spaceborne (1977)
- Women – for America, for the World (1986)
