= Donna Read =

Canadian film director

- Born: Donna Read Cooper; 1938 (age 87–88)
- Occupation: Filmmaker
- Children: 5

Donna Read (born 1938) is a Canadian film director and editor. Her work includes Women and Spirituality: The Goddess Trilogy and Yemanja: Wisdom from the African Heart of Brazil (2015).

== Career ==
Read is a Montreal-based film director and editor. She formed a film company, Belili Productions, with the feminist writer Starhawk. From 1963, Read worked at the National Film Board of Canada (NFB).

Between 1989 and 1993 Read directed a "Goddess Trilogy" about feminist spirituality, produced by Studio D. The first two parts of the trilogy, Goddess Remembered and The Burning Times, were supported by the NFB. The Catholic church made a failed attempt to ban The Burning Times. In 1991, the NFB refused to fund Read's work any further, citing the "controversy and lack of interest" surrounding her work.

=== Work ===
- November (1970) – editor
- Working Mothers series – editor
- Mask and Drum (1973) – producer and editor
- Kripalu (1973) - director
- C'est la Vie (1982) – editor
- It's Just Better (1982) – editor
- Too dirty for a woman – editor
- Behind the Veil: Nuns – editor
- Adam's World (1989) – director
- Goddess Remembered (1989) – director
- The Burning Times (1990) – director
- Full Circle (1993) – director
- Signs out of the Time: The life of archaeologist Marija Gimbutas (2004) with Starhawk - co-director, editor
- Permaculture: The Growing Edge (2010) – co-director
- Yemanja Wisdom from the African Heart of Brazil (2015)

== Awards ==
| Year | Nominee / work | Award | Result |
|---|---|---|---|
| 1993 | International Documentary Special Award for The Burning Times | CableACE Award | Won |
| 2016 | Saga Award for Special Contributions to Women's History and Culture | The Association for Study of Women and Mythology | Won |
| 2018 | Award for Outstanding Independent Documentary | Black Reel Awards | Nominated |
