= Matrifocal family =

Mother-centered family structure

A matrifocal family structure is one where mothers head families.

== Definition ==
In 1956, the concept of the matrifocal family was introduced to the study of Caribbean societies by Raymond T. Smith. He linked the emergence of matrifocal families with how households are formed in the region: "The household group tends to be matri-focal in the sense that a woman in the status of 'mother' is usually the de facto leader of the group, and conversely the husband-father, although de jure head of the household group (if present), is usually marginal to the complex of internal relationships of the group. By 'marginal' we mean that he associates relatively infrequently with the other members of the group, and is on the fringe of the effective ties which bind the group together".

Smith emphasises that a matrifocal family is not simply woman-centred, but rather mother-centred. Women in their role as mothers become key to organising the family group. Men tend to be marginal to this organisation and to the household, though they may have a more central role in other networks. Where matrifocal families are common, marriage is less common.

In later work, Smith tends to emphasise the household less, and to see matrifocality more in terms of how the family network forms with mothers as key nodes in the network. Throughout, Smith argues that matrifocal kinship should be seen as a subsystem in a larger stratified society and its cultural values. He increasingly emphasises how the Afro-Caribbean matrifocal family is best understood within a class-race hierarchy where marriage is connected to perceived status and prestige.

"A family or domestic group is matrifocal when it is centred on a woman and her children. In this case the father(s) of these children are intermittently present in the life of the group and occupy a secondary place. The children's mother is not necessarily the wife of one of the children's fathers." In general, according to Laura Hobson Herlihy citing P. Mohammed, women have "high status" if they are "the main wage earners", they "control ... the household economy", and males tend to be absent. Men's absences are often of long durations.

One of Raymond Smith's contemporary critics, M. G. Smith, notes that while households may appear matrifocal taken by themselves, the linkages between households may be patrifocal. That is, a man in his role as father may be providing, particularly economic support to a mother in one or more households whether he lives in that household or not. Both for men and for women having children with more than one partner is a common feature of this kind of system.

Alternative terms for 'matrifocal' or 'matrifocality' include matricentric, matripotestal, and women-centered kinship networks.

The matrifocal is distinguished from the concepts: matrilocal, the matrilineal, matrilateral and matriarchy. The last because matrifocality does not imply that women have power in the larger community.

== Characteristics and distribution ==
According to anthropologist Maurice Godelier, matrifocality is "typical of Afro-Caribbean groups" and some African-American communities. These include families in which a father has a wife and one or more mistresses; In a few cases, a mother may have more than one lover. Matrifocality was also found, according to Rasmussen per Herlihy, among the Tuareg people in northern Africa; according to Herlihy citing other authors, in some Mediterranean communities; and, according to Herlihy quoting Scott, in urban Brazil.

In their study of family life in Bethnal Green, London, during the 1950s, Young and Willmott found both matrifocal and matrilineal elements at work: mothers were a focus for distributing economic resources through the family network. They were also active in passing down the rights to tenancies in matrilineal succession to their daughters.

Herlihy found matrifocality among the Miskitu people, in the village of Kuri, on the Caribbean coast of northeastern Honduras in the late 1990s. According to Herlihy, the "main power" of Kuri women lies "in their ability to craft everyday social identities and kinship relations .... Their power lies beyond the scope of the Honduran state, which recognizes male surnames and males as legitimate heads of households." Herlihy found in Kuri a trend toward matriliny and a correlation with matrilineality, while some patriarchal norms also existed.

Herlihy found that the "women knew more than most men about village histories, genealogies, and local folklore" and that "men typically did not know local kinship relations, the proper terms of reference, or reciprocity obligations in their wife's family" and concluded that Miskitu women "increasingly assume responsibility for the social reproduction of identities and ultimately for preserving worldwide cultural and linguistic diversity". The Nair community in Kerala and the Bunt community in Tulunadu in South India are prime examples of matrifocality. This can be attributed to the fact that if males were largely warriors by profession, a community was bound to lose male members at youth, leading to a situation where the females assumed the role of running the family..

== History ==
In the 14th century, in Jiangnan, South China, under Mongol rule by the Yuan dynasty, Kong Qi kept a diary of his view of some families as practicing gynarchy, not defined as it is in major dictionaries but defined by Paul J. Smith as "the creation of short-term family structures dominated by women" and not as matrilineal or matriarchal. The gynarchy possibly could be passed down through generations. According to Paul J. Smith, it was to this kind of gynarchy that "Kong ascribed...the general collapse of society" and Kong believed that men in Jiangnan tended to "forfeit...authority to women".

Matrifocality arose, Godelier said, in some Afro-Caribbean and African American cultures as a consequence of enslavement of thousands. Slaves were forbidden to marry and their children belonged to the slavemasters. Some societies, particularly Western European, allow women to enter the paid labor force or receive government aid and thus be able to afford to raise children alone, while some other societies "oppose ... [women] living on their own."

In some factions of feminist belief, more common in the 1970s than in the 1990s–2000s, and criticized within feminism and within archaeology, anthropology and theology as lacking a scholarly basis, there was a "matrifocal, if not matriarchal, Golden Age" before patriarchy.

In 2025, scientists reported discovering that DNA from the remains of individuals in the Iron Age in Britain showed evidence that men had moved to join their wive's families. Among the remains of a Celtic group that occupied the central southern coastal region of England, between 100BC to AD100, most genetic material showed that they were descendants of the same woman.

== Conflation with matriarchy ==
Some have conflated matriarchy with matrifocality. There is some debate concerning the terminological delineation between matrifocality and matriarchy. Matrifocal societies are those in which women, especially mothers, occupy a central position in households. Anthropologist R. T. Smith refers to matrifocality as the kinship structure of a social system whereby the mothers assume structural prominence. The term does not necessarily imply domination by women or mothers. In addition, some authors depart from the structure of a mother-child dyad; instead, the grandmother is the central ancestor with her children and grandchildren clustered around her in an extended family. Matriarchs, according to Peoples and Bailey, do exist; there are "individual matriarchs of families and kin groups."

For example Daniel Moynihan in the late 20th century, claimed that there is a matriarchy among Black families in the United States, (Note: Black matriarchy, the cultural phenomenon of many Black families being headed by mothers with fathers absent) because a quarter of them are headed by single women; thus, families composing a substantial minority of a substantial minority could be enough for the latter to constitute a matriarchy within a larger non-matriarchal society with non-matriarchal political dynamics.

== See also ==
- Lahu people
