= Vicki Noble =

American writer (b. 1947)

- Born: 1947

Vicki Noble (born 1947) is an American feminist shamanic healer, writer, scholar and wisdom teacher.

== Life ==
Originally from Iowa, she arrived in Berkeley, California in 1976. In the 1970s she created, graduated with honors from, and subsequently taught in, the first women's interdisciplinary studies program at Colorado College. Noble worked for many years with archaeologist Marija Gimbutas, and has lectured and taught at the graduate level, both in the United States and abroad, on female shamanism and the healing arts. She has written several books, developed a ritual healing process, and led tours of women on pilgrimage to sacred Goddess sites around the world, including to Peru, Ireland, England, Bali, Malta, Greece, Turkey, Egypt and the Aegean Islands.

She has been appointed to a halftime position as Scholar in Residence in the Women's Spirituality graduate program at New College of California in San Francisco. She also currently teaches at the California Institute of Integral Studies. Her most recent research project has taken her into Russia to work with archaeologist Jeannine Davis-Kimball, director of the Center for the Study of Eurasian Nomads and founder of the Kazakh/American Research Project.

== Written works ==
With artist Karen Vogel, Noble co-authored the Motherpeace Tarot based upon the documented history and ethnography of female esoteric practices. Noble authored several highly respected books on female shamanism, such as Shakti Woman. In 1990 and 1991 she published a total of four issues of the magazine Snakepower, which received an Utne Reader nomination as Best First Publication. The content of the last two issues was consolidated into an anthology, edited by Noble and published by HarperSF in 1994, titled Uncoiling the Snake.

== List of works ==
- The Double Goddess: Women Sharing Power by Vicki Noble (June 19, 2003) Bear & Company ISBN 1-59143-011-9, ISBN 978-1-59143-011-7
- Down Is Up for Aaron Eagle: A Mother's Spiritual Journey With Down Syndrome by Vicki Noble (October 1993) Harpercollins ISBN 0-06-250737-0, ISBN 978-0-06-250737-2
- The Four Elements of Change by Heather Ash and Vicki Noble (June 1, 2004) Council Oak Books ISBN 1-57178-123-4, ISBN 978-1-57178-123-9
- Mini-Motherpeace Tarot Deck by Karen Vogel and Vicki Noble (June 1991) U.S. Games Systems (Mini Cards edition) ISBN 0-88079-513-1, ISBN 978-0-88079-513-5
- Motherpeace: A Way to the Goddess Through Myth, Art, and Tarot by Vicki Noble (Sept. 17, 1994) HarperOne ISBN 0-06-251085-1, ISBN 978-0-06-251085-3
- Motherpeace Round Tarot Deck by Karen Vogel and Vicki Noble (Cards — Dec 1988) U.S. Games Systems ISBN 0-88079-063-6, ISBN 978-0-88079-063-5
- Motherpeace Tarot: Deck & Book Set by Karen Vogel and Vicki Noble (July 1997) U.S. Games Systems (Cards edition) ISBN 1-57281-031-9, ISBN 978-1-57281-031-0
- Motherpeace Tarot Playbook by Vicki Noble and Jonathon Tenney (June 1986) Wingbow Press ISBN 0-914728-53-9, ISBN 978-0-914728-53-5
- Rituals and Practices with the Motherpeace Tarot by Vicki Noble (February 10, 2003) Bear & Company ISBN 1-59143-008-9, ISBN 978-1-59143-008-7
- Shakti Woman: Feeling Our Fire, Healing Our World by Vicki Noble (July 19, 1991) HarperOne ISBN 0-06-250667-6, ISBN 978-0-06-250667-2
- The Triple Goddess Tarot: The Power of the Major Arcana, Chakra Healing, and the Divine Feminine by Isha Lerner, Vicki Noble, and Mara Friedman (September 1, 2002) Bear & Company (Pap/Cards edition) ISBN 1-879181-94-0, ISBN 978-1-879181-94-6; Noble wrote the introduction
- Twelfth chapter of Transforming the Faiths of our Fathers: Women who Changed American Religion (2004), edited by Ann Braude. ISBN 1403964602
- Uncoiling the Snake: Ancient Patterns in Contemporary Women's Lives (A Snakepower Reader) by Vicki Noble (April 1993) Harpercollins ISBN 0-06-250549-1, ISBN 978-0-06-250549-1
