= List of matrilineal or matrilocal societies =

The following list includes societies that have been argued to practice matrilineality or matrilocality. "Matrilineal" means kinship or property is passed down through the maternal line. "Matrilocal" means new families are established in proximity to the wives extended family of origin, not that of the husband.

Culture (Note: Peoples who produced specific material cultures with no known ethnonym are put in italics.)	Region	Residence (Note: Separate refers to the practice of husbands and wives living in separate locations, often informally called walking marriages.)	Lineage	Reference
Abui	Alor archipelago	Patrilocal	Both	
Akan	West Africa	Both	Matrilineal	
Akimel Oʼodham	Aridoamerica	Matrilocal	Patrilineal	
Amis	Taiwan	Matrilocal	Matrilineal	
Aneuk Jamee	Sumatra	Matrilocal	Matrilineal	
Apache	Aridoamerica	Matrilocal	Matrilineal	
Bakor	Niger Delta	Patrilocal	Matrilineal	
Basques	Pyrenees	Matrilocal	Matrilineal	
Batek	Sumatra	Both	Both	
Bijago	Bissagos Islands	Patrilocal	Matrilineal	
Billava	Malabar Coast	Patrilocal	Matrilineal	
Bontoc people	Luzon	Patrilocal	Both	
Boyowan	Trobriand Islands	Patrilocal	Matrilineal	
Bribri	Cordillera de Talamanca	Matrilocal	Matrilineal	
Bunt	Malabar Coast	Patrilocal	Matrilineal	
Cantabri	Iberia	Matrilocal	Matrilineal	
Chamorro	Micronesia	Patrilocal	Matrilineal	Guampedia
Chams	Champa	Matrilocal	Matrilineal	
Cherokee	Southeastern Woodlands	Matrilocal	Matrilineal	
Chickasaw	Southeastern Woodlands	Matrilocal	Matrilineal	
Choctaw	Southeastern Woodlands	Matrilocal	Matrilineal	
Danes	Læsø	Matrilocal	Matrilineal (Note: only in informal everyday language.)	
Durotriges	Great Britain	Matrilocal	Matrilineal	
Enggano	Enggano Island	Matrilocal	Matrilineal	
Fore	New Guinea	Minority Matrilocal	Both	
Fur	Darfur	Matrilineal	Matrilocal	
Gallaeci	Iberia	Matrilocal	Matrilineal	
Garo	Zomia	Matrilocal	Matrilineal	
Gitxsan	Pacific Northwest	Patrilocal	Matrilineal	
Guna	Darien Gap	Matrilocal	Matrilineal	
Hallstatt	Europe	Unknown	Matrilineal	
Haudenosaunee	Great Lakes	Matrilocal	Matrilineal	
Hopi	Aridoamerica	Matrilocal	Matrilineal	
Huaorani	Andes	Matrilocal	Both	
Iban	Borneo	Both	Neither	
Imazighen	Sahara	Matrilineal	Matrilocal	
Jaintia	Zomia	Matrilocal	Matrilineal	
Jemez	Aridoamerica	Matrilocal	Matrilineal	
Jews	Levant	Patrilocal	Matrilineal	
Chicham peoples	Amazon	Matrilocal	Both	
Karen	Zomia	Matrilocal	Matrilineal	
Keres	Aridoamerica	Matrilocal	Matrilineal	
Kerinci	Sumatra	Matrilocal	Matrilineal	
Khasi	Zomia	Matrilocal	Matrilineal	
Kom	Ambazonia	Patrilocal	Matrilineal	
Kung	Kalahari Desert	Matrilocal	Both	
Lenape	Lenapehoking	Matrilocal	Matrilineal	
Lesbian	Aegean Islands	Matrilocal	Matrilineal	
Mahl	Lakshadweep archipelago	Separate	Matrilineal	
Marshallese	Micronesia	Matrilocal	Matrilineal	
Minangkabau	Sumatra	Separate	Matrilineal	
Mohican	Northeastern Woodlands	Matrilocal	Matrilineal	
Mosuo	Hengduan Mountains	Separate	Matrilineal	
Mukomuko	Sumatra	Matrilocal	Matrilineal	
Muscogee	Southeastern Woodlands	Matrilocal	Matrilineal	
Nair	Malabar Coast	Matrilocal	Matrilineal	
Navajo	Aridoamerica	Matrilocal	Matrilineal	
Ngada	Flores	Matrilocal	Matrilineal	
Ngazidja	Comoro Islands	Matrilocal	Matrilineal	
Nipmuc	New England	Matrilocal	Matrilineal	
Nubians	Nile valley	Patrilocal	Matrilineal	
Ovambo	Cuvelai-Etosha Basin	Patrilocal	Matrilineal	
Parisi (Arras)	Great Britain	Matrilocal	Matrilineal	
Petalangan	Riau Archipelago	Matrilocal	Matrilineal	
Picts	Great Britain	Non-matrilocal	Matrilineal (Note: This is an actively debated topic, some scholars don't think the written evidence for matriliny is conclusive.)	
Powhatan	Northeastern Woodlands	Matrilocal	Matrilineal	
Rhade	Dak Lak Plateau	Matrilocal	Matrilineal	
Sakai	Malay Peninsula	Matrilocal	Matrilineal	
Seminole	Florida peninsula	Matrilocal	Matrilineal	
Serer	Sahel	Patrilocal	Both	
Sinyar	Sahel	Matrilocal	Matrilineal	
Siraya	Taiwan	Matrilocal	Matrilineal	
Tai people	Southeast Asia	Matrilocal	Matrilineal	
Taiwanese	Taiwan	Matrilocal	Matrilineal	
Tiwi	Australia	Patrilocal	Matrilineal	
Tlingit	Pacific Northwest	Matrilocal	Matrilineal	
Tsimshian	Pacific Northwest	Matrilocal	Matrilineal	
Vanatinai	Tagula Island	Matrilocal	Matrilineal	
Wampanoag	New England	Matrilocal	Matrilineal	
Wayuu	Guajira Peninsula	Matrilocal	Matrilineal	
Wemale	Seram	Matrilocal	Matrilineal	
Zuni	Aridoamerica	Matrilocal	Matrilineal	

== See also ==
- Clan mother
- Matriclans
- Matriarchy
