= Matrilineality =

Tracing of kinship through the female line

Matrilineality, at times called matriliny, is the tracing of kinship through the female line. It may also correlate with a social system in which people identify with their matriline, their mother's lineage, and which can involve the inheritance of property and titles. A matriline is a line of descent where a person inherits his or her mother's lineage. In a matrilineal descent system, individuals belong to the same descent group as their mothers. The matriline of historical nobility was also called their enatic or uterine ancestry, in contrast to the patrilineal or "agnatic" ancestry. The matriline is also sometimes referred to as the "distaff" side or "spindle" side.

== Early human kinship ==
Scholars disagree on the nature of early human, that is, Homo sapiens, kinship. (Note: Neanderthals may have been patrilocal in mating patterns, again evidenced by aDNA (https://doi.org/10.1038/s41586-022-05283-y, but also see https://pmc.ncbi.nlm.nih.gov/articles/PMC3088635/, and https://doi.org/10.1038/s41586-022-05283-y for a population at the easternmost fringe of their known range).) In the late 19th century, most scholars believed, influenced by Lewis H. Morgan's book Ancient Society, that early kinship was matrilineal. Friedrich Engels took this up in The Origin of the Family, Private Property and the State. This thesis that our first domestic institution was the matrilineal clan, not the family, became communist orthodoxy. However, by the 20th century most social anthropologists disagreed, although during the 1970s and 1980s, feminist scholars often revived it.

Since about 2008, evolutionary biologists, geneticists and palaeoanthropologists have found indirect genetic and other evidence of early matriliny. Some genetic data suggest that over millennia, female sub-Saharan African hunter-gatherers and permaculturalists have lived with their maternal kin after marriage. Also, when sisters and their mothers help each other with childcare, the descent line tends to be matrilineal. Biological anthropologists now largely agree that cooperative childcare helped the large human brain and human psychology to evolve. Most primate species have males dispersing from their birth group and are thus materilinear, though chimpanzees and humans appear to be largely paterilinear nowadays.

Matriliny is often tied to matrilocality, which shows significant nuance. Pastoralists and farmers often gravitate toward patrilocality. However, studies show that hunter-gatherer societies have a flexible philopatry or practice multilocality; matrilocality and patrilocality are not the only possibilities. Flexibility leads to a more egalitarian society, as both men and women can choose with whom to live. So, for example, among the pygmy Aka Peoples a young couple usually settles in the husband's camp after the birth of their first child. However, the husband can stay in the wife's community, where one of his brothers or sisters can join him. Kinship and residence in hunter-gatherer societies may thus be complex and multifaceted. Supporting this, a re-check of past data on hunter gatherers showed that about 40% of groups were bilocal, 22.9% matrilocal, and 25% patrilocal. It is also worth noting that during the 20th century, the dominant position on cultural evolution and the evolution of kinship was the monolinear system, which assumed a gradual transition from matrilineality to patrilineality. At the moment, modern anthropologists refute this theory, proving the flexibility of transition models and the fact that the transition could be carried out in both directions depending on various external and internal factors.

== Matrilineal surname ==
Matrilineal surnames (matrinames) are names transmitted from mother to daughter, in contrast to the more familiar patrilineal surnames (patrinames) transmitted from father to son, the pattern most common among family names today.

== Cultural patterns ==
=== Clan names vs. surnames ===
Matrilineal groups are often made up of matrilineal clans, at times with descent groups or family groups each with a separate female ancestor. Sometimes the male ancestor, that is, the partner of the female ancestor where known, is mentioned as the ancestor though the clan is matrilineal. Surnames in these situations may follow several patterns. The clan name may be the surname, handed down matrilineally. The clan name may be tracked but not used in the personal names. This is true of the Minangkabau, for instance, who mostly use just one name. It is also true of the Akan, who do use two names, but do not inherit the second name, hence making it a surname but not a family name. The surname may also be the name of the descent group.

=== Care of children ===
While a mother normally takes care of her own children in all cultures, in some matrilineal cultures, particularly matrilocal ones, an "uncle-father," termed a social father, will take care of, and be guardian to, his nieces and nephews instead of his sons. The biological father plays little role in child rearing.

== Matriliny in specific ethnic groups ==
=== Africa ===
==== Akan ====
Some 20 million Akan live in Africa, particularly in Ghana and Ivory Coast. (See as well their subgroups, the Ashanti, also called Asante, Akyem, Bono, Fante, Akwamu.) Many but not all of the Akan still (2001) practice their traditional matrilineal customs, living in their traditional extended family households, as follows. The traditional Akan economic, political and social organization is based on maternal lineages, which are the basis of inheritance and succession. A lineage is defined as all those related by matrilineal descent from a particular ancestress. Several lineages are grouped into a political unit headed by a chief and a council of elders, each of whom is the elected head of a lineage – which itself may include multiple extended-family households. Public offices are thus vested in the lineage, as are land tenure and other lineage property. In other words, lineage property is inherited only by matrilineal kin.

"The principles governing inheritance stress sex, generation and age – that is to say, men come before women and seniors before juniors." When a woman's brothers are available, a consideration of generational seniority stipulates that the line of brothers be exhausted before the right to inherit lineage property passes down to the next senior genealogical generation of sisters' sons. Finally, "it is when all possible male heirs have been exhausted that the females" may inherit.

Each lineage controls the lineage land farmed by its members, functions together in the veneration of its ancestors, supervises marriages of its members, and settles internal disputes among its members.

The political units above are likewise grouped into eight larger groups called abusua (similar to clans), named Aduana, Agona, Asakyiri, Asenie, Asona, Bretuo, Ekuona and Oyoko. The members of each abusua are united by their belief that they are all descended from the same ancient ancestress. Marriage between members of the same abusua is forbidden. One inherits or is a lifelong member of the lineage, the political unit, and the abusua of one's mother, regardless of one's gender and/or marriage. Note that members and their spouses thus belong to different abusuas, mother and children living and working in one household and their husband/father living and working in a different household.

According to this source of further information about the Akan, "A man is strongly related to his mother's brother (wɔfa) but only weakly related to his father's brother. This must be viewed in the context of a polygamous society in which the mother/child bond is likely to be much stronger than the father/child bond. As a result, in inheritance, a man's nephew (sister's son) will have priority over his own son. Uncle-nephew relationships therefore assume a dominant position."

Certain other aspects of the Akan culture are determined patrilineally rather than matrilineally. There are 12 patrilineal Ntoro (which means spirit) groups, and everyone belongs to their father's Ntoro group but not to his (matrilineal) family lineage and abusua. Each patrilineal Ntoro group has its own surnames, taboos, ritual purifications, and etiquette.

A 2001 book provides this update on the Akan: Some families are changing from the above abusua structure to the nuclear family. Housing, childcare, education, daily work, and elder care etc. are then handled by that individual family rather than by the abusua or clan, especially in the city. The above taboo on marriage within one's abusua is sometimes ignored, but "clan membership" is still important, with many people still living in the abusua framework presented above.

==== Serer ====
The Serer people of Senegal, the Gambia and Mauritania are patrilineal (simanGol in Serer language) as well as matrilineal (tim). There are several Serer matriclans and matriarchs. Some of these matriarchs include Fatim Beye (1335) and Ndoye Demba (1367) – matriarchs of the Joos matriclan which also became a dynasty in Waalo (Senegal). Some matriclans or maternal clans form part of Serer medieval and dynastic history, such as the Guelowars. The most revered clans tend to be rather ancient and form part of Serer ancient history. These proto-Serer clans hold great significance in Serer religion and mythology. Some of these proto-Serer matriclans include the Cegandum and Kagaw, whose historical account is enshrined in Serer religion, mythology and traditions.

In Serer culture, inheritance is both matrilineal and patrilineal. It all depends on the asset being inherited – i.e. whether the asset is a paternal asset – requiring paternal inheritance (kucarla ) or a maternal asset – requiring maternal inheritance (den yaay or ƭeen yaay). The actual handling of these maternal assets (such as jewelry, land, livestock, equipment or furniture, etc.) is discussed in the subsection Role of the Tokoor of one of the above-listed main articles.

==== Tuareg ====
The Tuareg (Arabic:طوارق, sometimes spelled Touareg in French, or Twareg in English) are a large Berber ethnic confederation found across several nations in north Africa, including Niger, Mali and Algeria. The Tuareg are clan-based, and are (still, in 2007) "largely matrilineal". The Tuareg are Muslim, but mixed with a "heavy dose" of their pre-existing beliefs including matriliny.

Tuareg women enjoy high status within their society, compared with their Arab counterparts and with other Berber tribes: Tuareg social status is transmitted through women, with residence often matrilocal. Most women could read and write, while most men were illiterate, concerning themselves mainly with herding livestock and other male activities. The livestock and other movable property were owned by the women, whereas personal property is owned and inherited regardless of gender. In contrast to most other Muslim cultural groups, men wear veils but women do not. This custom is discussed in more detail in the Tuareg article's clothing section, which mentions it may be the protection needed against the blowing sand while traversing the Sahara desert.

==== Other ====
The title of the Rain Queen in South Africa is inherited via matrilineal primogeniture: dynastic descent is matrilineal, with only females eligible to inherit. The Berber inhabitants of Gran Canaria island had developed a matrilineal society by the time the Canary Islands and their people, called Guanches, were conquered by the Spanish. The Kongo people of Angola, the Democratic Republic of the Congo, Gabon and the Republic of the Congo have traditionally recognized their descent from their mother, and this lineage links them into kinship groups.

=== Americas ===
==== Haudenosaunee ====
The Haudenosaunee Confederacy, composed of six Native American nations, since before the U.S. became a nation, operates by The Great Binding Law of Peace, a constitution by which women pass down matrilineal-rights and participate in the League's political decision-making, including deciding whether to proceed to war, which has been referred to as a matriarchy or "gyneocracy". When the constitution was first established is unknown but is possibly between 1000 and 1450. It has been orally passed down for generations.

Other Iroquoian-speaking peoples such as the Wendat and the Meherrin, that were never part of the Iroquois League, nevertheless have traditionally possessed a matrilineal family structure.

==== Lenape ====
Occupied for 10,000 years by Native Americans, the land that is present-day New Jersey was overseen by clans of the Lenape, who farmed, fished, and hunted upon it. The pattern of their culture was that of a matrilineal agricultural and mobile hunting society that was sustained with fixed, but not permanent, settlements in their matrilineal clan territories. Leadership by men was inherited through the maternal line, and the women elders held the power to remove leaders of whom they disapproved.

Villages were established and relocated as the clans farmed new sections of the land when soil fertility lessened and when they moved among their fishing and hunting grounds by seasons. The area was claimed as a part of the Dutch New Netherland province dating from 1614, where active trading in furs took advantage of the natural pass west, but the Lenape prevented permanent settlement beyond what is now Jersey City.

"Early Europeans who first wrote about these Indians found matrilineal social organization to be unfamiliar and perplexing. As a result, the early records are full of 'clues' about early Lenape society, but were usually written by observers who did not fully understand what they were seeing."

==== Pueblo ====
The Hopi (in what is now the Hopi Reservation in northeastern Arizona), according to Alice Schlegel, had as its "gender ideology ... one of female superiority, and it operated within a social actuality of sexual equality." According to LeBow (based on Schlegel's work), in the Hopi, "gender roles ... are egalitarian .... [and] [n]either sex is inferior." LeBow concluded that Hopi women "participate fully in ... political decision-making." According to Schlegel, "the Hopi no longer live as they are described here" and "the attitude of female superiority is fading". Schlegel said the Hopi "were and still are matrilinial" and "the household ... was matrilocal".

Schlegel explains why there was female superiority as that the Hopi believed in "life as the highest good ... [with] the female principle ... activated in women and in Mother Earth ... as its source" and that the Hopi "were not in a state of continual war with equally matched neighbors" and "had no standing army" so that "the Hopi lacked the spur to masculine superiority" and, within that, as that women were central to institutions of clan and household and predominated "within the economic and social systems (in contrast to male predominance within the political and ceremonial systems)", the Clan Mother, for example, being empowered to overturn land distribution by men if she felt it was unfair, since there was no "countervailing ... strongly centralized, male-centered political structure".

Genetic data has also established matriliny and matrilocality of an elite among Ancestral Pueblo People, from 8th to 11th century AD, in Chaco Canyon, New Mexico.

==== Tsenacommacan ====
The Powhatan Confederacy and neighboring tribes of Tsenacommacah practiced a version of male-preference matrilineal seniority, favoring brothers over sisters in the current generation (but allowing sisters to inherit if no brothers remained), but passing to the next generation through the eldest female line. In A Map of Virginia John Smith of Jamestown explains:

His [Chief Powhatan's] kingdome descendeth not to his sonnes nor children: but first to his brethren, whereof he hath 3 namely Opitchapan, Opechancanough, and Catataugh; and after their decease to his sisters. First to the eldest sister, then to the rest: and after them to the heires male and female of the eldest sister; but never to the heires of the males.

==== Other ====
The Wayuu people of Colombia and Venezuela live in matrilineal clans, with paternal relationships in the background. The Naso (Teribe or Térraba) people of Panama and Costa Rica describe themselves as a matriarchal community, although their monarchy has traditionally been inherited in the male line. The Kogi people of northern Colombia practice bilateral inheritance, with certain rights, names or associations descending matrilineally. The Bororo people of Brazil and Bolivia live in matrilineal clans, with husbands moving to live with their wives' extended families. The clan system of the Bribri people of Costa Rica and Panama is matrilineal; that is, a child's clan is determined by the clan his or her mother belongs to. Only women can inherit land. The social organization of the Cabécar people of Costa Rica is predicated on matrilineal clans in which the mother is the head of household. Each matrilineal clan controls marriage possibilities, regulates land tenure, and determines property inheritance for its members. In the traditional culture of the Guna people of Panama and Colombia, families are matrilinear and matrilocal, with the groom moving to become part of the bride's family. The groom also takes the last name of the bride.

The Upper Kuskokwim people are the original inhabitants of the Upper Kuskokwim River basin. They speak an Athabaskan language more closely related to Tanana than to the language of the Lower Kuskokkwim River basin. They were traditionally hunter-gatherers who lived in matrilineal semi-nomadic bands. The Tlingit people, the original inhabitants of the Lingít Aaní in Alaska and Canada, are organized into Matrilineal Clans. All property both physical and intellectual are owned by their clan. The Tanana Athabaskan people, the original inhabitants of the Tanana River basin in Alaska and Canada, traditionally lived in matrilineal semi-nomadic bands. The Diné (Navajo) people of the American southwest are a matrilineal society in which kinship, children, livestock and family histories are passed down through the female. In marriage the groom moved to live with the bride's family. Children also came from their mother's clan living in hogans of the females family. The Mandan people of the northern Great Plains of the United States historically lived in matrilineal extended family lodges.

=== Asia ===
==== Kurds ====
Matriliny was occasionally practiced by mainstream Sorani, Zaza, Feyli, Gorani, and Alevi Kurds, though the practice was much rarer among non-Alevi Kurmanji-speaking Kurds. Alevi identity is often matrilineal in practice, especially among Alevis from Dersim.

The Mangur clan of the, Culturally, Mokri tribal confederation and, politically, Bolbas Federation is an enatic clan, meaning members of the clan can only inherit their mothers last name and are considered to be a part of the mothers family. The entire Mokri tribe may have also practiced this form of enaticy before the collapse of their emirate and its direct rule from the Iranian or Ottoman state, or perhaps the tradition started because of depopulation in the area due to raids.

==== Minangkabau ====
In the Minangkabau matrilineal clan culture in Indonesia, a person's clan name is important in their marriage and their other cultural-related events. Two totally unrelated people who share the same clan name can never be married because they are considered to be from the same clan mother (unless they come from distant villages). Likewise, when Minangs meet total strangers who share the same clan name, anywhere in Indonesia, they could theoretically expect to feel that they are distant relatives. Minang people do not have a family name or surname; neither is one's important clan name included in one's name; instead one's given name is the only name one has.

The Minangs are one of the world's largest matrilineal societies/cultures/ethnic groups, with a population of 4 million in their home province West Sumatra in Indonesia and about 4 million elsewhere, mostly in Indonesia. The Minang people are well known within their country for their tradition of matriliny and for their "dedication to Islam" – despite Islam being "supposedly patrilineal". This well-known accommodation, between their traditional complex of customs, called adat, and their religion, was actually worked out to help end the Minangkabau 1821–37 Padri War.

The Minangkabau are a prime example of a matrilineal culture with female inheritance. With Islamic religious background of complementarianism and places a greater number of men than women in positions of religious and political power. Inheritance and proprietorship pass from mother to daughter.

A culture similar to lareh bodi caniago, practiced by the Minangkabau, is the basis for adat perpatih practices in the state of Negeri Sembilan and parts of Malacca as a product of West Sumatran migration into the Malay Peninsula in the 15th century.

==== Nairs ====
The system of matrilineal inheritance was known as Marumakkathayam in the Nair community In the matrilineal system of Kerala, southern India, the family lived together in a tharavadu which was composed of a mother, her brothers and younger sisters, and her children in a system called as Marumakkathayam. The oldest male member was known as the Karnavar and was the head of the household, managing the family estate. Lineage was traced through the mother, and the children belonged to the mother's family. The surname would be from the maternal side and all family property was jointly owned. In the event of a partition, the shares of the children were clubbed with that of the mother. The Karnavar's property was inherited by his sisters' sons rather than his own sons. Almost all the kingdoms in Kerala practised this system, with the Karnavar of the family becoming the king. The Arakkal kingdom of Kerala followed a similar matrilineal system of descent: the eldest member of the family, whether male or female, became its head and ruler. Amitav Ghosh has stated that, although there were numerous other matrilineal succession systems in communities of the south Indian coast, the Nairs "achieved an unparalleled eminence in the anthropological literature on matriliny".

==== Neolithic China ====
Archaeological data supports the theory that during the Neolithic period (7000 to 2000 BCE) in China, Chinese matrilineal clans evolved into the usual patrilineal families by passing through a transitional patrilineal clan phase. Evidence includes some "richly furnished" tombs for young women in the early Neolithic Yangshao culture, whose multiple other collective burials imply a matrilineal clan culture. Toward the late Neolithic period, when burials were apparently of couples, "a reflection of patriarchy", an increasing elaboration of presumed chiefs' burials is reported. Ancient DNA from a late neolithic site in Northern China (Fujia in Shandong Province), dated around 2700 BCE, showed both matrilocality and possibly a general preference for the maternal bloodline as opposed to affinal (marital) kin.

==== Tamils ====
Matriliny among the Sri Lankan Muslims and Tamils in the Eastern Province of Sri Lanka arrived from Kerala, India via Muslim traders before 1200 CE. Matriliny here includes kinship and social organization, inheritance and property rights. For example, "the mother's dowry property and/or house is passed on to the eldest daughter." Both ethnic groups speak the Tamil language. The Tamils largely practice Hinduism. The three groups are about equal in population size.

According to Kanchana N. Ruwanpura, Eastern Sri Lanka "is highly regarded even among" feminist economists "for the relatively favourable position of its women, reflected" in women's equal achievements in Human Development Indices "(HDIs) as well as matrilineal and" bilateral "inheritance patterns and property rights". She also conversely argues that "feminist economists need to be cautious in applauding Sri Lanka's gender-based achievements and/or matrilineal communities", because these matrilineal communities coexist with "patriarchal structures and ideologies" and the two "can be strange but ultimately compatible bedfellows", as follows:

She "positions Sri Lankan women within gradations of patriarchy by beginning with a brief overview of the main religious traditions," Buddhism, Hinduism, and Islam, "and the ways in which patriarchal interests are promoted through religious practice" in Eastern Sri Lanka (but without being as repressive as classical patriarchy). Thus, "feminists have claimed that Sri Lankan women are relatively well positioned in the" South Asian region, despite "patriarchal institutional laws that ... are likely to work against the interests of women," which is a "co-operative conflict" between women and these laws. (Clearly "female-heads have no legal recourse" from these laws which state "patriarchal interests".) For example, "the economic welfare of female-heads [heads of households] depends upon networks" ("of kin and [matrilineal] community"), "networks that mediate the patriarchal-ideological nexus." She wrote that "some female heads possessed" "feminist consciousness" (Note: Feminist consciousness raising, a means of raising awareness of a feminist perspective or subject) and, at the same time, that "in many cases female-heads are not vociferous feminists ... but rather 'victims' of patriarchal relations and structures that place them in precarious positions.... [while] they have held their ground ... [and] provided for their children".

On the other hand, she also wrote that feminists including Malathi de Alwis and Kumari Jayawardena have criticized a romanticized view of women's lives in Sri Lanka put forward by Yalman, and mentioned the Sri Lankan case "where young women raped (usually by a man) are married-off/required to cohabit with the rapists!"

==== Other ====
Originally, Chinese surnames were derived matrilineally, although by the time of the Shang dynasty (1600 to 1046 BCE) they had become patrilineal. Relatively isolated ethnic minorities such as the Mosuo (Na) in southwestern China are highly matrilineal.

Some Hindu communities in Southwest India practiced matriliny such as the Tiyyas and some Namboothiri Brahmins Matriliny is practiced by the Bunts and Billava in the state of Karnataka. It is called Aliyasantana in their communities, which were subdivided into clans. This system was exceptional in the sense that it was one of the few traditional systems in India that gave women some liberty and the right to property. In the northeast Indian state Meghalaya, the Khasi, Garo, Jaintia people have a long tradition of a largely matrilinear system in which the youngest daughter inherits the wealth of the parents and takes over their care.

Most ethnic groups classified as "(Montagnards, Malayo-Polynesian and Austroasian)" are matrilineal. On North Vietnam, according to Alessandra Chiricosta, the legend of Âu Cơ is said to be evidence of "the presence of an original 'matriarchy' ... and [it] led to the double kinship system, which developed there .... [and which] combined matrilineal and patrilineal patterns of family structure and assigned equal importance to both lines." (Note: Patrilineal, belonging to the father's lineage, generally for inheritance)

There is evidence of matriliny in Pre-Islamic Arabia among a subclan of the Amarite tribal confederation of Ancient Saba.

=== Europe ===
==== Celts ====
Genetic evidence shows matriliny, and matrilocality, among Celts in Iron Age Britain. As other data indicate patriarchy in the Early Bronze Age, this may indicate a rare patriarchal to matrifocal transition. There is evidence of matrilineal royal descent, from maternal uncle to nephew, in early Iron Age (ca. 500 BCE) Celtics in continental Europe. In Pictish society, succession in leadership (later kingship) was matrilineal, with the reigning chief succeeded by either his brother or perhaps a nephew but not through patrilineal succession of father to son.

==== Other ====
While men held positions of religious and political power, the Spartan constitution mandated that inheritance and proprietorship pass from mother to daughter.

=== Oceania ===
Some oceanic societies, such as the Marshallese and the Trobrianders, the Palauans, the Yapese and the Siuai, are characterized by matrilineal descent. The sister's sons or the brothers of the decedent are commonly the successors in these societies. The initial people of Micronesia practiced matrilocality, as seen in ancient DNA. The Arabana people of South Australia are described by Francis Gillen and Walter Baldwin Spencer in their 1899 book The Native Tribes of Central Australia (in which the name is spelled Urabunna) as counting their descent "in the female line".

The Diyari people of South Australia are described by Francis James Gillen and Walter Baldwin Spencer in their 1899 book The Native Tribes of Central Australia (in which the name is spelled Dieri) as counting their descent "in the female line". The Tiwi people living on the Tiwi Islands of Australia's Northern Territory base their social structure on matrilineal kinship groups. Traditional marriage practices have persisted in spite of the presence of Christian missionaries on the islands.

== Matrilineal identification within Judaism ==
Matriliny in Judaism or matrilineal descent in Judaism is the tracing of Jewish descent through the maternal line. Close to all Jewish communities have followed matrilineal descent from at least early Tannaitic (c. 10–70 CE) times through modern times.

The origins and date-of-origin of matrilineal descent in Judaism are uncertain. Orthodox Judaism maintains that matrilineal descent is an Oral Law from at least the time of the Receiving of the Torah on Mount Sinai (c. 1310 BCE). According to some modern academic opinions, it was likely instituted in either the early Tannaitic period (c. 10–70 CE) or the time of Ezra (c. 460 BCE).

In practice, Jewish denominations define "Who is a Jew?" via descent in different ways. All denominations of Judaism have protocols for conversion for those who are not Jewish by descent.

Orthodox Judaism and Conservative Judaism still practice matrilineal descent. Karaite Judaism, which rejects the Oral Law, generally practices patrilineal descent. Reconstructionist Judaism has recognized Jews of patrilineal descent since 1968.

In 1983, the Central Conference of American Rabbis of Reform Judaism passed a resolution waiving the need for formal conversion for anyone with at least one Jewish parent, provided that either (a) one is raised as a Jew, by Reform standards, or (b) one engages in an appropriate act of public identification, formalizing a practice that had been common in Reform synagogues for at least a generation. This 1983 resolution departed from the Reform Movement's previous position requiring formal conversion to Judaism for children without a Jewish mother. However, the closely associated Israel Movement for Reform and Progressive Judaism has rejected this resolution and requires formal conversion for anyone without a Jewish mother.

== Exception for the enslaved in the United States ==
In the United States, the offspring of enslaved women inherited their mother's status following the principle of Partus sequitur ventrem. A significant consequence of this is that children resulting from rape or unions between enslaved women and their owners did not have any of the rights of the father as they would have had under the patrilineal succession that applied to everyone but the enslaved.

== In mythology ==
Certain ancient myths have been argued to expose ancient traces of matrilineal customs that existed before historical records.

The ancient historian Herodotus is cited by Robert Graves in his translations of Greek myths as attesting that the Lycians of their times "still reckoned" by matrilineal descent, or were matrilineal, as were the Carians.

In Greek mythology, while the royal function was a male privilege, power devolution often came through women, and the future king inherited power through marrying the queen heiress. This is illustrated in the Homeric myths where all the noblest men in Greece vie for the hand of Helen (and the throne of Sparta), as well as the Oedipian cycle where Oedipus weds the recently widowed queen at the same time he assumes the Theban kingship.

This trend also is evident in many Celtic myths, such as the (Welsh) mabinogi stories of Culhwch and Olwen, or the (Irish) Ulster Cycle, most notably the key facts to the Cúchulainn cycle that Cúchulainn gets his final secret training with a warrior woman, Scáthach, and becomes the lover of her daughter; and the root of the Táin Bó Cuailnge, that while Ailill may wear the crown of Connacht, it is his wife Medb who is the real power, and she needs to affirm her equality to her husband by owning chattels as great as he does.

The Picts are widely cited as being matrilineal.

A number of other Breton stories also illustrate the motif. Even the King Arthur legends have been interpreted in this light by some. For example, the Round Table, both as a piece of furniture and as concerns the majority of knights belonging to it, was a gift to Arthur from Guinevere's father Leodegrance.

Arguments also have been made that matriliny lay behind various fairy tale plots which may contain the vestiges of folk traditions not recorded.

For instance, the widespread motif of a father who wishes to marry his own daughter—appearing in such tales as Allerleirauh, Donkeyskin, The King who Wished to Marry His Daughter, and The She-Bear—has been explained as his wish to prolong his reign, which he would lose after his wife's death to his son-in-law. More mildly, the hostility of kings to their daughter's suitors is explained by hostility to their successors. In such tales as The Three May Peaches, Jesper Who Herded the Hares, or The Griffin, kings set dangerous tasks in an attempt to prevent the marriage.

Fairy tales with hostility between the mother-in-law and the heroine—such as Mary's Child, The Six Swans, and Perrault's Sleeping Beauty—have been held to reflect a transition between a matrilineal society, where a man's loyalty was to his mother, and a patrilineal one, where his wife could claim it, although this interpretation is predicated on such a transition being a normal development in societies.

== See also ==
- Ruth Bré, advocate for matriliny
- Maiden and married names
- Mater semper certa est, "the mother is always certain" – until 1978 and in vitro pregnancies.
- Matriarchy
- Matrifocal family
- Partus sequitur ventrem
- Wehali
