= Mokri =

Mokri may refer to:

- Mokri (surname), an Iranian-Kurdish surname
- Mokri, India, a village in India
- Mokryan or Mokri, a Kurdish emirate 15h-19th century

== See also ==
- Mokryan
