= Matrilineal society of Meghalaya =

Migration flow in Meghalaya

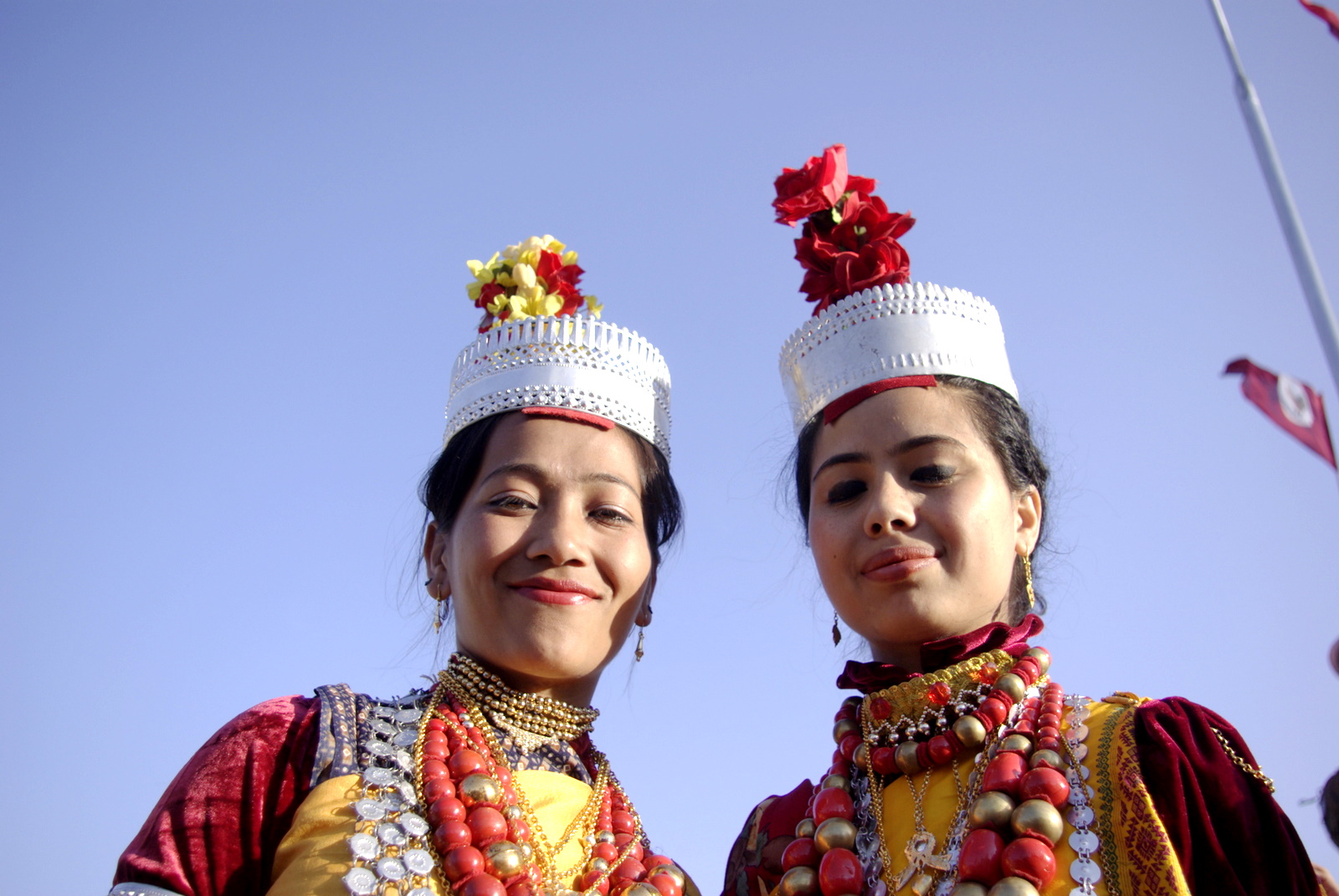
Khasi women

Multiple tribes in the state of Meghalaya in northeast India practise matrilineal descent. Often referred to as Khasi people and Garo people, among the Khasi people which is a term used as a blanket term for various subgroups in Meghalaya who have distinguishing languages, rites, ceremonies, and habits, but share an ethnic identity as Ki Hynniew Trep (The Seven Huts) whereas the Garo people refers to the various groups of Achik people. The Khasi, Garo, and other subgroups have a proud heritage, including matrilineality, although it was reported in 2004 that they were losing some of their matrilineal traits. The tribes are said to belong to one of the "largest surviving matrilineal culture[s]" in the world.

"This system will survive because the people zealously guard this system. It has support from many quarters, including the indigenous religious systems.... The NGOs in Meghalaya also support this system." – C Joshua Thomas, regional director, Indian Council of Social Science Research

== Background ==
Khasi, among multiple tribes in the state of Meghalaya in northeast India, practise matrilineal descent. They are referred to as Khasi people; Khasi is used as an umbrella phrase to refer to many subgroups in Meghalaya who have distinguishing languages, rites, ceremonies, and habits, but share an ethnic identity as Ki Hynniew Trep (The Seven Huts).

Khasi are an ancient tribe said to be the "largest surviving matrilineal culture[s]" in the world. who, along with other subgroups, such as Garo, live in Meghalaya, as well as bordering areas of Assam and Bangladesh. Khasis are believed to be migrants with ancestral links to the Mon-Khmer people of East Asia. The matrilineal tradition which the Khasi and other subgroups practice in Meghalaya is unique within India. Matrilineal principles among the Khasi are emphasised in myths, legends, and origin narratives. Khasi kings embarking on wars left the responsibility of running the family to women and thus their role in society became very deep rooted and respected. Reference to Nari Rajya (female kingdom; or land of matriarchy) in the epic Mahabharata likely correlates with the Khasi and Jaintia Hills and Meghalaya's present-day matrilineal culture. The proud heritage of the Khasi, Garo, and other subgroups is matrilineality; however in 2004 it was reported that their matrilineal traits were on the wane.

== Rights, roles, responsibilities ==
Women have a dominant role in the matrilineal society of Meghalaya. The youngest daughter of the family, the Ka Khadduh, inherits all ancestral property. After marriage, husbands live in the mother-in-law's home. The mother's surname is taken by children. When no daughters are born to a couple, they adopt a daughter and pass their rights to property to her. The birth of a girl is celebrated while the birth of a son is simply accepted. There is no social stigma attributed to a woman remarrying or giving birth out of wedlock as the "Khasi Social Custom Lineage Act" gives security to them. Women are known to intermarry outside their tribe. The women who enjoy all the rights live an independent life, dress well, attend church, and many prefer not to get married. They enjoy total security, unlike in the rest of the country. A successful career woman of the Khasi society feels that "their societal anomaly" has enabled her to be successful in every way. Most small businesses are managed by women.

In 1994, Bina Agarwal compared characteristic features between the Garo and Khasi. She reported that Garo practiced matrilineal inheritance, matrilocal post-marital residence, a preference for cross-cousin marriage, acceptance of pre-marital sex by women, but adultery by women is punished, while the Khasi practised matrilineal inheritance, matrilocal and duolocal post-marital residence (in which the husband lives in a separate house while the wife stays at her parents’ residence), an aversion to cross-cousin marriage, and again, acceptance of pre-marital sex by women, but adultery by women is punished.

Care of children is the responsibility of mothers or mothers-in-law. The youngest daughter of this society who inherits the ancestral property holds a pivotal role of looking after the welfare of her parents in their old age, as well as the welfare and education of her siblings.

Some Khasi men perceive themselves to be accorded a secondary status. They have established societies such as the Syngkhong Rympei Thymmai (SRT) (3,000 members) and Sam Kam Rin Ku Mai (Societal Restructuring Association) to protect equal rights for men. They express that "Khasi men don’t have any security, they don’t own land, they don’t run the family business and, at the same time, they are almost good for nothing." However, Patricia Mukhim, who edits the Shillong Times feels: "I tend to think Khasi men feel diminished in their manhood compared with outsiders... it's a pity, because that's what distinguishes us from the others".

While the society is matrilineal, it is not matriarchal. In past monarchies of the state, the son of the youngest sister of the king inherited the throne. Even now in the Meghalaya Legislative Assembly or village councils or panchayats the representation of women in politics is minimal. As of 2013, in a Meghalaya Legislative Assembly of 60 members, there are only four women. In the male-centric Dorbar Shnong, which is the basic political arm of the tribes, women are not permitted to hold office. However, women feel that they take better care of money matters than men and they enjoy economic freedom.

== Bibliography ==
- Agarwal, Bina (1994). A Field of One's Own: Gender and Land Rights in South Asia. Cambridge University Press. ISBN 978-0-521-42926-9.
- Gupta, Pranab Kumar Das (1984). Life and Culture of Matrilineal Tribe of Meghalaya. Inter-India Publications.
- Lyndem, Biloris; De, Utpal Kumar (2004). Education in North East India: Experience and Challenge. Concept Publishing Company. ISBN 978-81-8069-063-1.
- Mann, Rann Singh (1996). Aspects of Indian Social Anthropology. Concept Publishing Company. ISBN 978-81-7022-586-7.
- Schweizer, Thomas; White, Douglas R. (1998). Kinship, Networks, and Exchange. Cambridge University Press. ISBN 978-0-521-59021-1.
- Sen, Soumen (2004). Khasi-Jaintia Folklore: Context, Discourse, and History. NFSC www.indianfolklore.org. ISBN 978-81-901481-3-9.
