= Mokri, India =

Mokari
- Village
- Location in Bihar, India Mokari (India)
- Coordinates: 25.01838°N 83.56328°E
- Country: India
- State: Bihar
- District: Kaimur

Area
  - Total: 4.10 km^{2} (1.58 sq mi)
- Elevation: 94 m (308 ft)

Population (2011)
  - Total: 8,398
  - Density: 2,050/km^{2} (5,310/sq mi)

Languages
  - Official: Bhojpuri, Hindi
- Time zone: UTC+5:30 (IST)

Mokari is a large village in Bhabua block of Kaimur district, Bihar, India. As of 2011, its population was 8,398, in 1,458 households.
