= The Three May Peaches =

French fairy tale

The Three May Peaches (French: Les Trois pêches de mai) is a French fairy tale collected by Paul Delarue. He collected more than thirty French types of this tale, which is known in Europe, North Africa, and Asia as far as India.

It is Aarne-Thompson type 570, the Rabbit Herd.

It opens with Aarne-Thompson type 610, Fruit to Cure the Princess, which is seldom a stand-alone plot; it combines with the Rabbit Herd, as in this, or with type 461, Three Hairs from the Devil, as in The Griffin.

== Synopsis ==
A king of Ardenne had a beautiful daughter who was sick. A doctor declared that the three finest May peaches would save her, but then she would have to marry within a week or fall sick again. Many men came with peaches, but none saved the princess. A woman had three sons, and the oldest set out with the finest peaches from their orchard. He met an old woman who asked what he had; he claimed rabbit dung, she said that so it was, and when he got to the castle, that was what he carried. His next brother set out next, told the old woman he carried horse dung, and again found that was what he carried. The youngest, who was short and regarded as a little simple, persuaded his mother to let him try as well, and told the old woman that he carried the peaches to cure the princess, and she said so it was and also gave him a silver whistle. When he got to the castle, eating the peaches revived the princess.

The king did not want such a puny little son-in-law. He told the boy had to herd a hundred rabbits and not lose one for four days. The first day, the rabbits scattered, but the boy used the whistle to bring them back. The second day, the king sent the princess to get one; the boy would only trade one for a kiss, and when she had it and had reached the gates of the castle, he used the whistle, and it came back. The next day, the king sent the queen to get one; the boy would only trade one if the queen turned three somersaults, and when she did, the king locked it in a room but the boy used his whistle and it came back through a window. The fourth day, the king went himself. The boy would only trade it if the king kissed his donkey's behind. When the king had gotten the rabbit, he had it killed and skinned and put on to casserole, but the boy used his whistle and it jumped out of the dish, back into its skin, and back to the boy.

Then the king said that the boy had to fill three sacks with truths. He said the princess had kissed him for a rabbit, and that filled the first sack; the queen had turned somersaults for a rabbit, and that filled the second. The king stopped him and let him marry the princess.

== Variants ==
=== France ===
Leopold Dardy collected another tale, from Gascony, quite similar to the story, titled La hillo dou réy et lous pécécs (French: La fille du roi et les pêches; English: "The king's daughter and the peaches").

Léon Pinault published a variant from Bonnétable, titled Les Oranges, which Ernst Tegethoff translated as Die Pomeranzen. In this tale, a princess wants to eat bitter oranges because she is sick. A farmer's three sons try their luck: the first two offend a poor old woman on their way to the castle and their fruits turn to feces and donkey's ears; while the youngest is kind and courteous and is given a magic wand in return. The poor youth cures the princess, but the king orders him to pasture his hundred hares.

In a variant from Corbières, collected and published by archaeologist Jean Guilaine (fr) with the name Les Cent Lapins Forains, the princess wishes to eat pears. A charcoal-maker's three sons try their luck: the first two insult an old lady (in truth, a fairy) on the road to the castle and their fruits turn into faeces and rats. The third son shows her his basket of pears and the old lady blesses him with her magic. The princess likes the beautiful fruits the poor boy brought, but the king refuses to accept a poor youth as son-in-law, so he tasks him with guarding his royal hares. With the help of a magic whistle and a baton the old lady gives him, he accomplishes the task and the tale concludes with the episode of the sack of lies/truths.

In a tale from Provence, The Rabbit-Herd, a king promises his daughter to whoever brings him fresh figs. Three brothers meet an old woman on their way to the castle; the two elders offend the old woman and their figs are turned into heads with horns, while the youngest fulfills the king's request. Not wanting to marry his daughter to a poor man, the king sets him on a task to herd a hundred rabbits in the mountains. The old woman reappears and gives the youth a silver whistle.

=== The Netherlands ===
Author Charles Deulin published a French-language tale about the Manneken-Pis statue, with a similar title. According to Francis Hindes Groome, the tale was translated into English and published in the Temple Bar. In this tale, titled Manneken, a poor sabot-maker who lives in Brabant gives a pair of sabots to the Wandering Jew and is paid with a peach-stone. He plants the peach-stone in his garden, a peach tree sprouts and it yields peaches all year round. Some time later, the King of the Netherlands announces that he will give his daughter to whoever brings him peaches during wintertime. The sabot-maker's elder sons get a basketful and make their way to the king's castle, when they meet a beggar-woman on the way. They offend her and their peaches turn to acorns and toads. The youngest son, named Peterkin or Crickey, tries his luck and meets the beggar-woman. He tells her he is carrying peaches and the beggar-woman wishes for them to be the finest peaches. Peterkin brings the basket to the king, who eats the fruits. Seeing that a poor sabot-maker's son brought him the fruits, he refuses to make him his son-in-law, and invents a new test for him: to take the king's flock of twelve rabbit, feed them in the forest for three days and return it complete. The beggar-woman appears to him and gives him a silver whistle, with which Peterkin summons the rabbit back to him. A fat lord, the princess (disguised as a milkmaid) and the king himself (disguised as an aboot) try to undermine the boy's efforts, to no avail. At the end of the tale, the king orders Peterkin to fill three surprise bags.

== See also ==
- Jesper Who Herded the Hares
