= Jesper Who Herded the Hares =

Scandinavian fairy tale

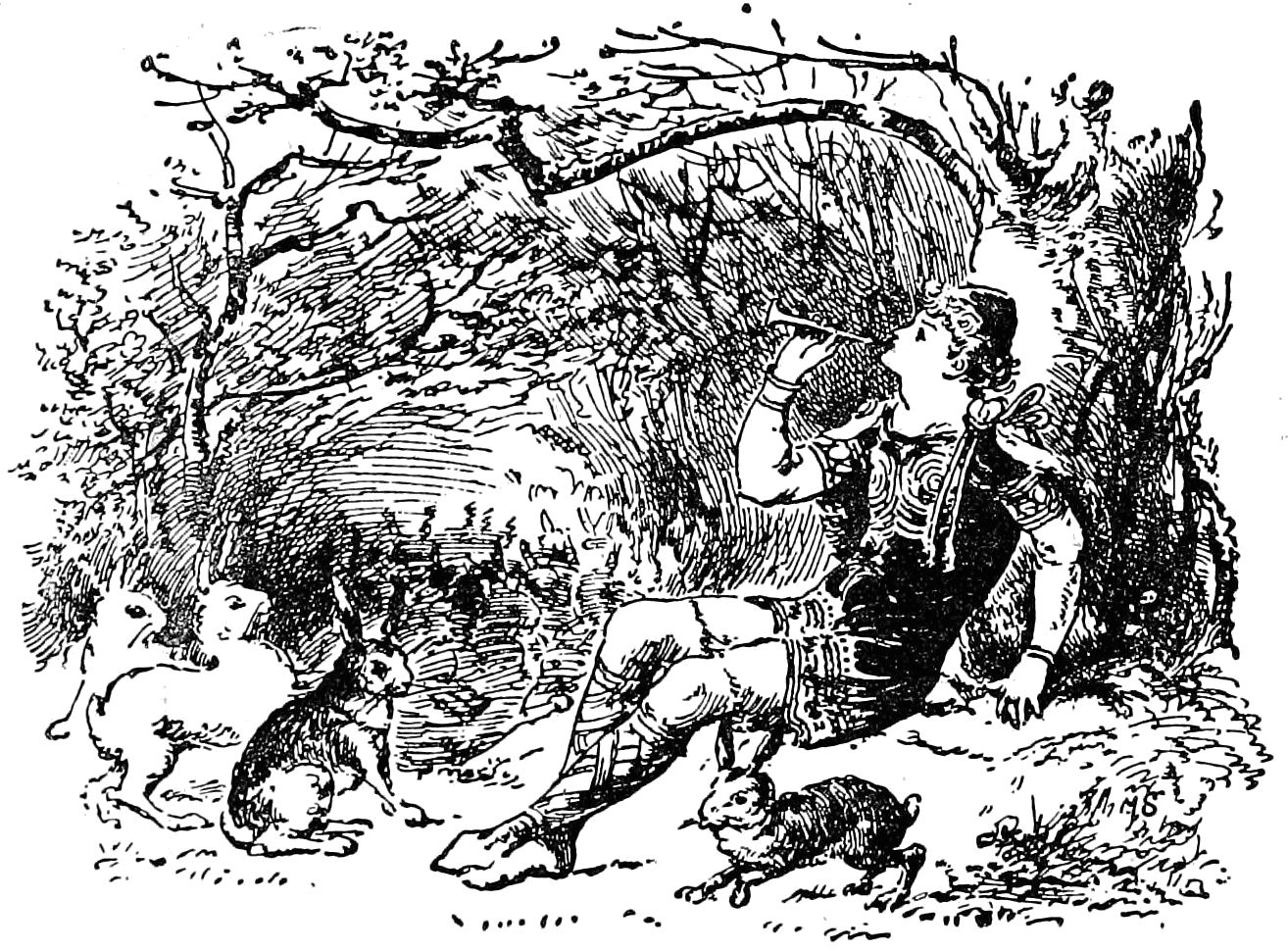
- Jesper (Boots) summons the hares with the magical pipe. Illustration by John Moyr Smith for Tales from the Fjeld (1896).

Folk tale
- Name: Jesper Who Herded the Hares
- Aarne–Thompson grouping: ATU 570 ("The Rabbit-Herd")
- Region: Scandinavia
- Published in: Æventyr fra Jylland by Evald Tang Kristensen

Jesper Who Herded the Hares (Danish: Jesper Harehyrde) is a Scandinavian fairy tale, first recorded by Danish folktale collector Evald Tang Kristensen in the first volume of Æventyr fra Jylland. Andrew Lang included it in The Violet Fairy Book.

The motif of herding hares is a common fairy tale theme. Another tale featuring it is The Three May Peaches. This tale, and The Griffin, also feature the test of truthfully telling what the character is carrying.

The tale and its variants are grouped under the Aarne-Thompson-Uther Index as ATU 570, "The Rabbit-Herd" or "The Sack of Lies".

== Synopsis ==
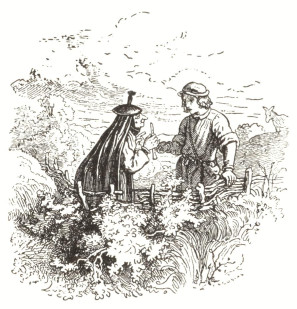
The old woman gives the youth the magical pipe. Woodcut for Bechstein's book, by Ludwig Richter (1853).

A king of a kingdom so small he could see every border from the towers on his castle, still was proud of it. Having a single daughter, he wished her to marry a man fit to be king. He declared that whoever brought him twelve of the finest pearls (to ensure the wooer was rich) and could perform certain tasks would marry her. Many princes and merchants brought the pearls but failed the tasks, and many tried false pearls and were turned away more quickly.

A fisherman had three sons: Peter, Paul, and Jesper. One day he caught three dozen oysters, each of which had a fine pearl. It was decided that each son would have his chance to win the princess. On the way, Peter met the King of the Ants, who was battling the King of the Beetles and had been worsted; he asked for Peter's help, and Peter said he was too busy. Then he met an old woman, who asked what he was carrying; he said cinders, she said that, very well, it was cinders, and when he got to the castle, the pearls turned into cinders. He did not tell what had happened when he came home. Paul tried, and met the same fate. Jesper tried; he helped the king of the ants, who won the field with him, and told the old woman of his pearls. The old woman begged some food from him, since he could eat at the castle. He handed over his entire lunch. The old woman called him back and gave him a whistle that would bring back what he had lost.

The king was not pleased with such a son-in-law. He had a sack each of wheat, barley, oats, and rye mixed together and told Jesper he had to sort them in a day. The ants did it for him.

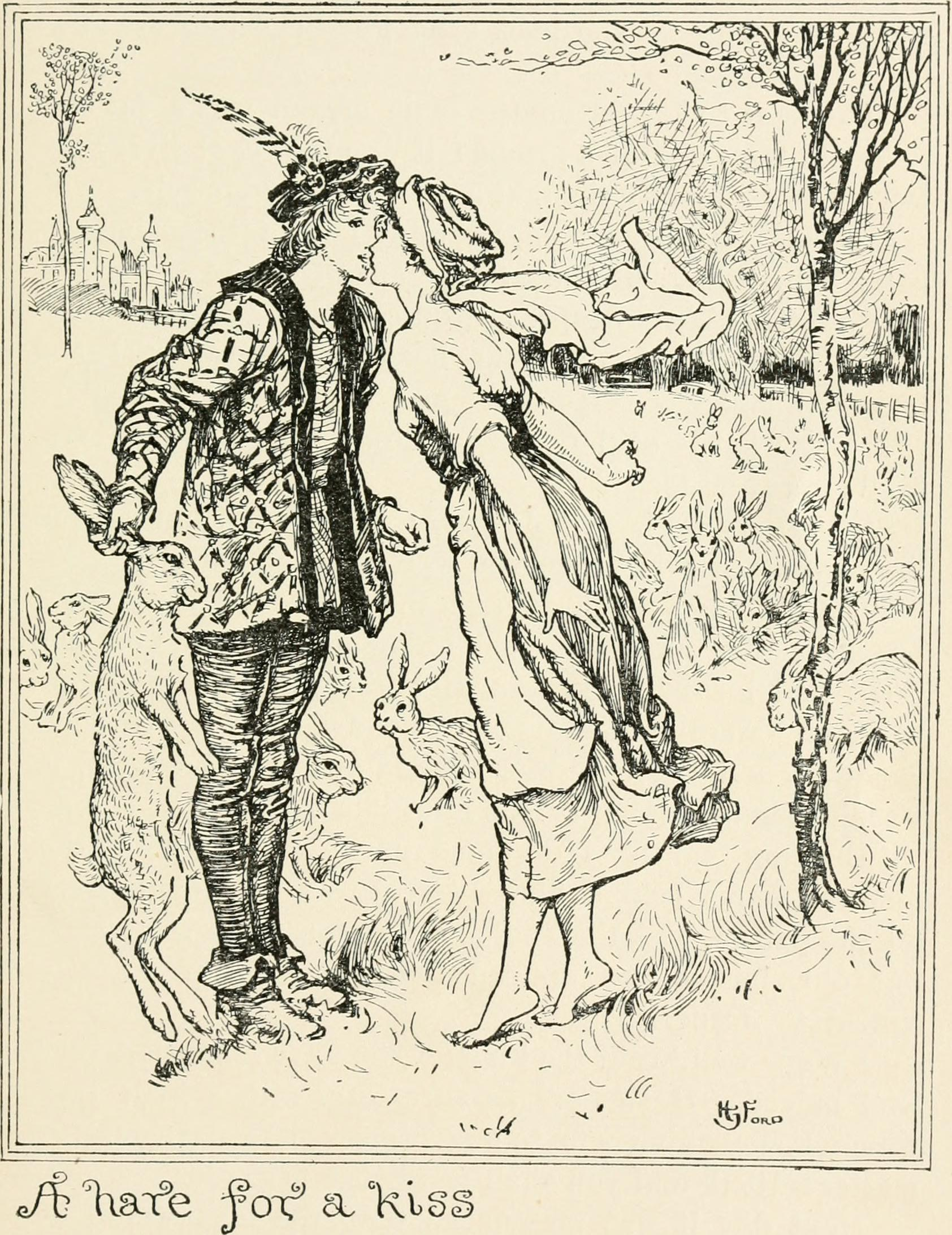
The maiden asks the shepherd for a kiss in exchange for a hare. Illustration by Henry Justice Ford for Andrew Lang's The Violet Fairy Book (1901).

Then he was set to herd a hundred hares. Using the whistle, he kept them together. The king heard of it and resolved to stop him. A shabby girl begged for a hare to feed for guests; finally, Jesper agreed to give her one in return for a kiss, but then he whistled it back. A stout old woman, in peasant dress, came next. He agreed to give her one if she would tiptoe about him cackling like a hen, and then he whistled it back. A fat old man in a royal groom's livery came, and Jesper agreed to give him one if he stood on his head, and then whistled it back.

The next day, the king set out a tub and said that Jesper must fill it with undoubted truths, and he would judge when that was. Jesper told about the girl, and that she was the princess; then about the woman, and that she was the queen; then about the old man—and the king declared that the tub was full, so Jesper married the princess, and the king decided he would be a good king if he looked after the people as well as he looked after the hares.

== Analysis ==
=== Tale type ===
The tale is classified in the international Aarne-Thompson-Uther Index as type ATU 570, "The Rabbit-Herd": the humble protagonist offers to herd the king's hares (or some type of animal), which he does with the use of a magical instrument.

== Variants ==
=== Distribution ===
The tale is said to be found all over Europe, "from Iceland to the Caucasus". It is reported that more than 200 or 400 variants have been recorded, specially from North and Central Europe: 79 versions from Finland; 36 French versions, as noted by Paul Delarue; 53 from all over Germany and 25 in the Schleswig-Holstein region, according to Kurt Ranke.

The tale is also claimed by Jack Haney to be "little known outside Russia", but "common in Western Europe". Swedish scholar Waldemar Liungmann located variants across Romance-, Germanic-, Slavic-, Baltic- and Finno-Ugrian speaking areas.

This geographic distribution seems to confirm professor Stith Thompson's analysis that the tale "is essentially European", instead of having an Eastern origin. Liungmann also supposed that the tale originated in Europe, probably from a Germanic source.

The tale has migrated to the Americas, being found in both North and South America, according to Kurt Ranke. Variants are also found in Turkey, the Levant and in China. Paul Delarue also commented that the tale type exists in Western Asia "as far as India", and in North Africa.

=== Predecessors ===
The oldest attestation of the tale is considered to be a 1791 publication, unlike other European folktales with a long literary history. Scholarship supposes this happened due to the raciness of the tale. For instance, folklorist Elsie Clews Parsons noted that the informant of a South Carolina variant omitted the details about the sexual encounter between the male protagonist and the women, which were referenced in the Cape Verde tales. William Bernard McCarthy, in the same vein, cited that a storyteller knew of two versions of the tale, one for general audiences and other for a male public.

=== Europe ===
==== Scandinavia ====
Benjamin Thorpe translated a Danish version with the title Temptations, where a poor cottager's son employs himself under a master who knows the black arts. The master owns a farm of hares that have to be herded by the boy. This tale was also published in a compilation of Norse folktales. Louis Brueyre indicated that this story was actually the work of Carit Etlar.

Illustrator Katherine Pyle published a story titled The Magic Pipe: A Norse Tale, where the hero's name is translated as Boots, who wants to offer his services to king to herd the royal hares.

A version from Sweden is reported to have been collected and published with the name The King's Hares.

===== Norway =====
Tale type ATU 570 is known in Norway with the title Gjete kongens harer ("Herding the King's Hares"), according to Ørnulf Hodne's The Types of the Norwegian Folktale.

A version was collected by Peter Asbjornsen in the original Norwegian, named Gjæte Kongens Harer, and later translated as The King's Hares. The note on the translation, by Klara Stroebe, mentioned a variation regarding a cauldron instead of a sack.

The Norwegian variant was given as Ashiepattle and the King's Hares in Round the Yule Log: Norwegian Folk and Fairy Tales.

A literary version of the tale was titled The King's Rabbit Keeper, whose source was given as a Norse legend in the summary.

George Webbe Dasent translated the tale as Osborn's Pipe in his second compilation of Norse folktales (Tales from the Fjeld), where the hero's name was given as Osborn Boots.

==== Baltic Region ====
===== Estonia =====
The tale type is known in Estonia as Jänesekarjus ("The Hare Herder").

===== Latvia =====
The tale type is also registered in Latvia, with the title Zaķu gans ("The Rabbit-Herd").

===== Lithuania =====
Lithuanian folklorist Jonas Balys, in his analysis of Lithuanian folktales (published in 1936), listed 13 variants of type 570, "Zuikiu piemuo" ("The Herd of Rabbits").

In a variant whose source was pointed as Lithuanian, One Hundred Hares, three brothers try to win the hand of the princess and meet a beggar on the way. The two elder insult the beggar while the youngest brother, stupid and a simpleton, acts courteously towards the beggar and is given a magic whistle in return.

In another Lithuanian variant, The Fool Who Pastured a Hundred Rabbits, the foolish youngest brother receives a magic whistle to pasture the king's one hundred hares. In the next day, he uses a magical trumpet to pasture the king's hundred horses. The tale was originally published by Christoph Jurkschat in 1898 with the name Hundert Hasen ("A Hundred Hares").

==== Russia ====
In a Russian variant, The Wondrous Hares, a landlord gives the peasant even greater numbers of hares to herd, which he does with a magical fife. When he needs to herd three hundred hares, the landlord's daughter tries to buy one from the peasant, but he asks in return for her to show her birthmarks.

==== Poland ====
The tale type is known in Poland as Głupie pasie zające ("The Fool Who Herded Hares"), in the Polish Folktale Catalogue by Julian Krzyżanowski.

Polish ethnographer Stanisław Ciszewski (pl) collected two variants, one from Narama and another from Szczodrkowice, grouped under the banner O parobku, co upasł królewskie zające i nagadał pełny worek gadek ("About the farmer, who fattened the royal hares and filled a sack with a bunch of lies").

In another Polish variant, "Пастух, который тысячу зайцев пас" ("The Youth that Herded a Thousand Hares"), "in the time of the Tartarian invasions", Vsemil makes his way through the Carpathan Mountains, and meets an old man in the woods. He shares his food with the old man and receives in return a pipe. Vsemil goes forth and sits to drink a bit of milk, when he sees another man coming. He shares his drink with the newcomer and the man gives him a whip. At last, he meets a third man on the road and gives him a bit of money, and gains a cane. Vsemil employs himself to a local lord as his rabbit-herd. He uses the pipe to command the hares to follow him to graze in the meadow, the cane to draw every animal around it, and the whip to command the hare that he gives the princess to return to the meadow.

==== Belgium ====
Roger Pinon listed three dialectal variants (L'chuflot insôrcèlè, El chuflot d'saule and a manuscript one), two from Lièges and the other from Soignies.

==== Germany ====
Ludwig Bechstein collected a German variant titled Der Hasenhüter und die Königstochter or The Hare-Keeper, where an old man gives the shepherd a reed to herd the hares. The tale keeps the raciness lacking in other variants. However, this peculiar characteristic is still present in German variants Der Hasenhirt ("The Hare-Herd"), by Johann Wilhelm Wolf; Der Wollensack ("The woolen sack"), by Ulrich Jahn; in Die grüne Feige ("The Green Fig"), by Adalbert Kuhn.

In a variant from Flensberg, Knæsben Askfis (Tale II), a farmer's three sons, Pe'r, Poul and Knaesben Askfis leave home to try their luck in the world. Askfis goes to the king and is tasked with herding his three hundred hares, which he does by use of a whistle.

==== Central Europe ====
In a Central European tale collected by Theodor Vernaleken (Piping Hans), the princess throws a potato to a crowd of potential suitors. Whoever fetches it must submit themselves to three tasks, the first of which is to herd "several hundred hares". Vernaleken also pointed the existence of an Austrian variant from Haugsdorf where there is the same task of rabbit herding, but with a specific amount of 700 (seven hundred) hares.

Swiss fairy tale Der Figesack ("The sack of figs"), collected by Otto Sutermeister, was pointed by author Adeline Rittershaus as a close parallel to Norwegian The King's Hares.

In a Moravian tale, Hloupý Honza ("Foolish Honza"), the three sons of a farmer go to the castle in order to give the princess some figs to cure her ailment (ATU 610, "The Healing Fruits"), but only the youngest, Honza, manages to do so, because he was kind towards an old man. Despite the peasant healing his daughter, the king still sets Honza on the task of herding the innumerable royal hares. Thanks to a whistle the old man gave him, Honza succeeds in his task.

==== Southern Europe ====
The tale type is attested in Italian folktale compilations, with nine variants, according to a 20th century inquiry,

Austrian diplomat Johann Georg von Hahn collected a Greek variant from "Wisiani", where the worldly-beautiful princess sets tasks for the hero. One of the tasks is to herd exactly ninety-nine hares. Von Hahn suggested that the number of hares may be related to a mythical German character named "Frau Harke".

The motif of herding the hares also happens as an episode of the Bosnian fairy tale Die Pferde der Wilen: it begins with the youngest of three brothers standing guard in a meadow and capturing three magical horses (akin to ATU 530, "The Princess on the Glass Mountain") and continues with the king setting the task of building a golden ship that navigates on land and water (ATU 513). Near the end of the story, a giant that can run fast and owns three hares joins the heroes, and the king sends his servant to buy one of the giant's hares.

===== Spain =====
According to Hispanist Ralph Steele Boggs, the tale type is also attested in Spain, combined with tale type Aarne-Thompson 851, "The Princess who could not solve the Riddle". Aurelio Macedonio Espinosa collected two variants titled El acertajo from Toledo and Granada, and Juan Soldao y la Princesa, from Retortillo, Soria. Other variants have been attested as Catalan rondalles from Eivissa (Ibiza).

In a variant from Mallorca, Der Lügensack (Es sach de mentides), a peasant is tasked with herding a lord's thirteen roosters, and whenever the lord himself tries to buy one, or sends his wife and daughter to do so, the peasant summons a helpful eagle to bring the rooster back.

In an Asturian tale from Somiedo, titled El pastor de conejos ("The Rabbit-Herd"), a man named Quevedo falls in love with the princess, but her father, the king, sets a task for him: to take the king's twelve hares, herd them for a year and return with all twelve. Quevedo meets an old lady who gives him a magic whistle ("silbato"). Two other princesses, the queen and the king try to buy a hare, but Quevedo blows the whistle and summons the hares back. Later, the king orders the man to fill a sack of lies.

===== Portugal =====
According to Portuguese scholars Isabel Cárdigos and Paulo Jorge Correia, tale type ATU 570, O Pastor de Coelhos ("The Rabbit-Herd"), is also present in Portuguese-speaking countries, like Portugal, Brazil and Cape Verde.

In a Portuguese variant, Os figos verdes (English: "The Green Figs"), the Virgin Mary gives the foolish hero a harmonica, with which he can command the king's hares.

==== Hungary ====
In a variant titled Az három aranygyűrű ("The three rings"), a maltreated prince receives aid from a bearded man, who gives him a whistle to herd the king's 100 geese. The story also involves guessing the princess's birthmarks (ATU 850).

In a second tale, Az asznavehetlen bognár ("The Useless Wagoner"), collected by Jeremiah Curtin, a king insults his good-for-nothing wagoner and forces him to do impossible tasks, with the help of a fox. The third task is herding the king's hares, which he does by means of a whistle the fox gave him.

Hungarian writer Elek Benedek recorded a variant from his country, titled A király nyulai ("The King's Hares"). This tale was translated by Michel Klimo as Les Lièvres du Roi. In this variant, a widow's three sons want to work for the king. On their way, they meet a little mouse that asks for food; the elder ones refuse to give, but the youngest shares his meal with the petit animal and receives a magic whistle. When the older ones are hired to herd the king's hares, they let one escape and are dismissed by the king. When it is the youngest's turn, he uses the magic whistle to summon them.

==== Scotland ====
Robert Chambers collected and published Jock and his lulls, from Scotland, which was translated into French language as Jock et ses pipeaux by Louis Brueyre. In this tale, two brothers named Jock try to make their fortune in the world and employ themselves as a hare-keeper to the king. The herd has a lame hare; the first Jock sacrifices it for food, which causes the king to hang him; the second Jock takes care of it and gets to marry the princess.

==== Wales ====
Scholar Francis Hindes Groome published a Welsh-Gypsy tale titled The Ten Rabbits (Romani: I Shuvali Râni): an old woman lives with her three sons. One day, the elder two seek employment in a gentleman's castle to herd his rabbits. An old man comes to him and asks a bit of their food. They refuse to share their food with him. Each of the brothers fail in herding the rabbit and are punished by death. The youngest brother, a fool, finds employment with the same gentleman to herd the rabbits. He shares his food with the old man and is given a silver whistle to summon all rabbits together. He succeeds in the task and gains the gentleman's daughter as wife.

==== Yiddish ====
In a Yiddish folktale from Russia, Forty Hares and a Princess, the poor youth is tasked by the king with herding the royal forty hares, which he does by the use of a magic whistle. Suspecting the king is up to his tricks, when a disguise monarch tries to buy one of the hares, the boy forces the king to kiss the hare's tail. When he next is assigned to fulfill a sack with lies, the king stops the boy before he reveals the embarrassing episode.

=== America ===
Variants from the tale have been collected in North Carolina, Missouri and in the Ozark Mountains. A variant titled The Bag of Stories was collected in Sea Islands, South Carolina.

Anthropologist Elsie Clews Parsons collected a variant from Dominica titled The Sackful of Lies: the princess and the queen try to buy the hare from the poor sailor, who asks in return for them to lie with him.

=== Africa ===
An Azorian variant, Fresh Figs, was collected by Elsie Spicer Eells: a rich man promises his daughter for anyone who can cure her (ATU 610, "The Healing Fruits"). When the rich man sees that the simpleton youth was the one who did it, he tasks him with herding his hares. The youth receives a magical pipe from a lady in blue.

Anthropologist Elsie Clews Parsons collected two Cape Verdian variants. In the first, the boy is born with a whistle in his hand which he uses to summon all rats in the world; the king tries to bribe the boy by sending his Black maid, his daughter and the queen. In the second, the protagonist offers a riddle to the princess, who cannot solve it; her father, the king, sends the youth to fatten his three hares by the end of thirty days.

=== Asia ===
==== Middle East ====
The tale type is reported to exist in Jewish folktale collections, with the name The Sun Rises in the West.

==== China ====
An Uygur tale involving folk hero Aniz is considered by scholarship to contain similarities to tale type 570, "The Rabbit-Herd".

=== Literary variants ===
A literary version titled The Enchanted Whistle (Le sifflet enchanté) is attributed to French author Alexandre Dumas: the young peasant receives a magic whistle from a mysterious old lady to command the creatures. The king sets three tasks for him, the first to herd one hundred hares, which he does with ease by the use of the whistle. The king tries to make the boy fail by buying one hare from him. After the three tasks are accomplished, the king prepares the "sackful of lies" as a final test for the peasant.

Another French variant of the tale type was adapted and retold as The Magic Whistle.

== Adaptations ==
Peter Asbjornsen's version was adapted in the Soviet Union in 1960 as a 20 minute cartoon named «Королевские зайцы» (The Royal Hares).

The German version of the tale, by Ludwig Bechstein, was adapted into a Märchenfilm in 1977, titled Der Hasenhüter (de).

A Hungarian variant of the tale was adapted into an episode of the Hungarian television series Magyar népmesék ("Hungarian Folk Tales") (hu), with the title Nyúlpásztor ("The Rabbit-Herd").

== See also ==
- The Griffin (fairy tale) (German fairy tale by the Brothers Grimm)
- The Three May Peaches (French fairy tale)
- The Swineherd (literary fairy tale by Hans Christian Andersen)
