= Ancient Celtic women =

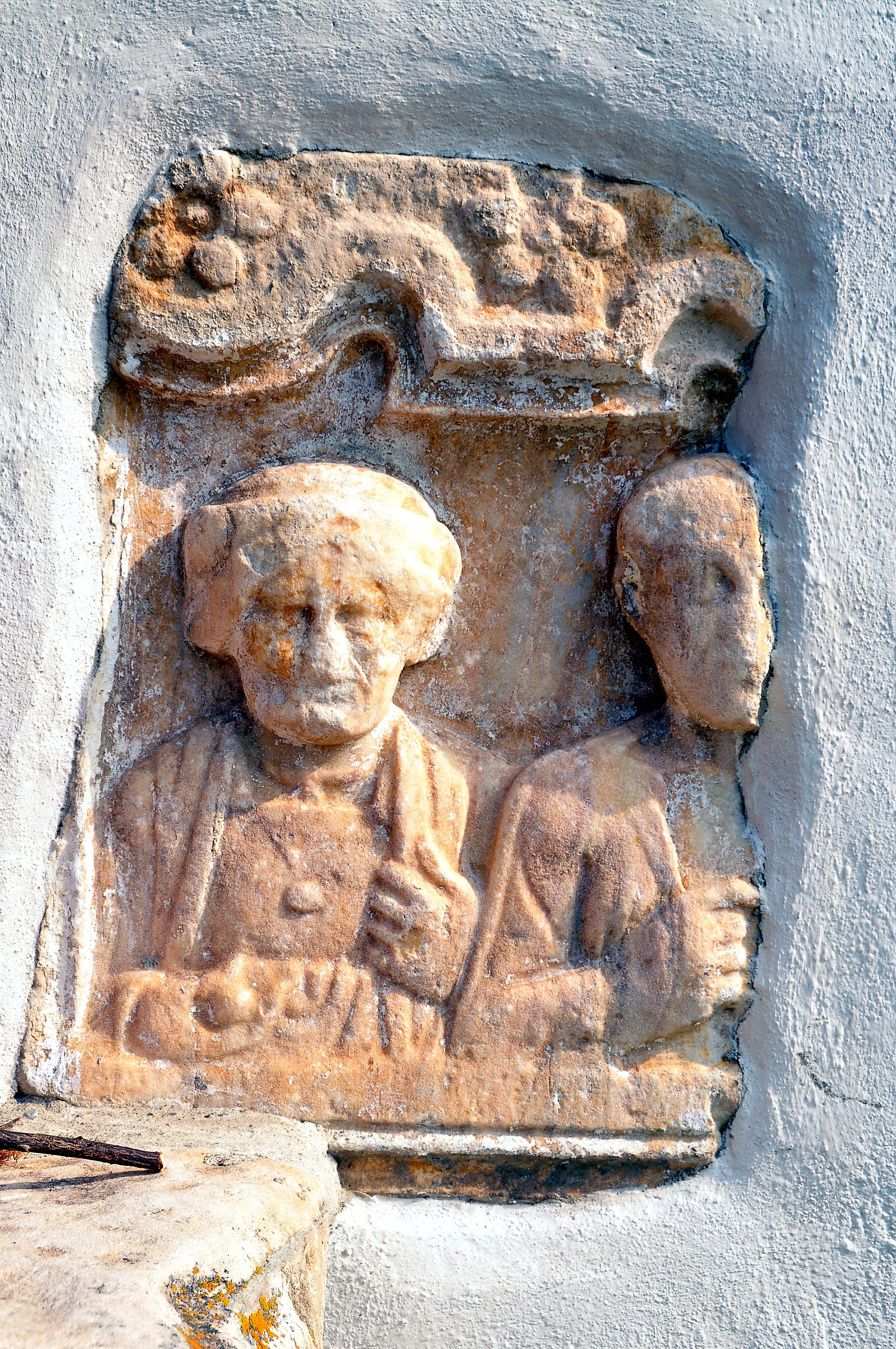
Celtic married couple (Wölfnitz-Lendorf, Kärnten)

The social position of ancient Celtic women cannot be determined with certainty due to the sarcity and low quality of the available sources. On one hand, great female Celts are known from mythology and history; on the other hand, women's status in Celtic societies was in many ways socially and legally constrained.

Historical knowledge of Celtic women's status is almost entirely obtained from Greek and Roman sources, which may have been biased or inaccurate. Some information may also be taken from orally transmitted myths later reflected in Celtic literature of the Christian era. However, written accounts and collections of these myths are only known from the early Middle Ages, long after the Roman conquests and the spread of Christianity, which casts doubt on their reliability.

Archaeology has provided some evidence for ancient Celtic women's position. Reliefs and sculptures of Celtic women are known from the Gallo-Roman culture. Prestigious burials of Celtic women have been found alongside genetic evidence for matrilineality and matrilocality among some Celtic peoples.

== Duration and extent of Celtic culture ==
Expansion of Celtic peoples and languages: Area of the Hallstatt culture in the 6th century BC. Great Celtic expansion, c.275 BC. Lusitania (Celtic settlement uncertain) The area of the Celtic languages today

The Celts (Ancient Greek Κέλτοι Keltoi; Latin Celtae, Galli, Galati) were tribes and tribal confederations of ancient Europe, who resided in west central Europe in the Late Bronze Age and early Iron Age (the Hallstatt culture). In the La Tène period they expanded, through migration and cultural transmission, to the British Isles, northern Iberia, the Balkan peninsula and Asia Minor. The Greeks and Romans commonly referred to areas under Celtic rule as Κελτική or Celticum. They had a relatively uniform material culture (especially in the La Tène period) and non-material culture (customs and norms), which differed from neighbouring peoples like the Italians, Etruscans, Illyrians, Greeks, Iberians, Germans, Thracians, and Scythians.

The Celtic mainland was characterised by this culture from c. 800 BC at the earliest until about the fifth century AD (end of the Roman rule in the Celtic sphere and Christianisation of Ireland). Claims made by some Celtic scholars, that traces of Celtic culture are already visible in the second millennium BC, are controversial. In Post-Roman Britain, Celtic culture and rule continued, until pushed to the margins of the island after the arrival of the Anglo-Saxon settlers. In Ireland, Celtic culture remained dominant for even longer.

Linguistically, the Celts were united as speakers of Celtic languages, which were and are Indo-European languages related most closely to German and Latin, with clear common features.

== Evidence ==
References to Celtic women are rare and, with the exception of medieval source material from Brittany and the British Isles, derived from the writings of the Celts' Greek and Roman neighbours. In addition, the overwhelming majority of these sources come from the first century BC and the first century AD. The main problem, however, is the fact that the term Celtic spans such an enormous area, from Ireland to Anatolia; there is no reason to expect that the position of women was the same over this whole area. Source material must, therefore, be clarified by archaeological evidence, which, however, can only answer certain kinds of questions.

=== Archaeology ===
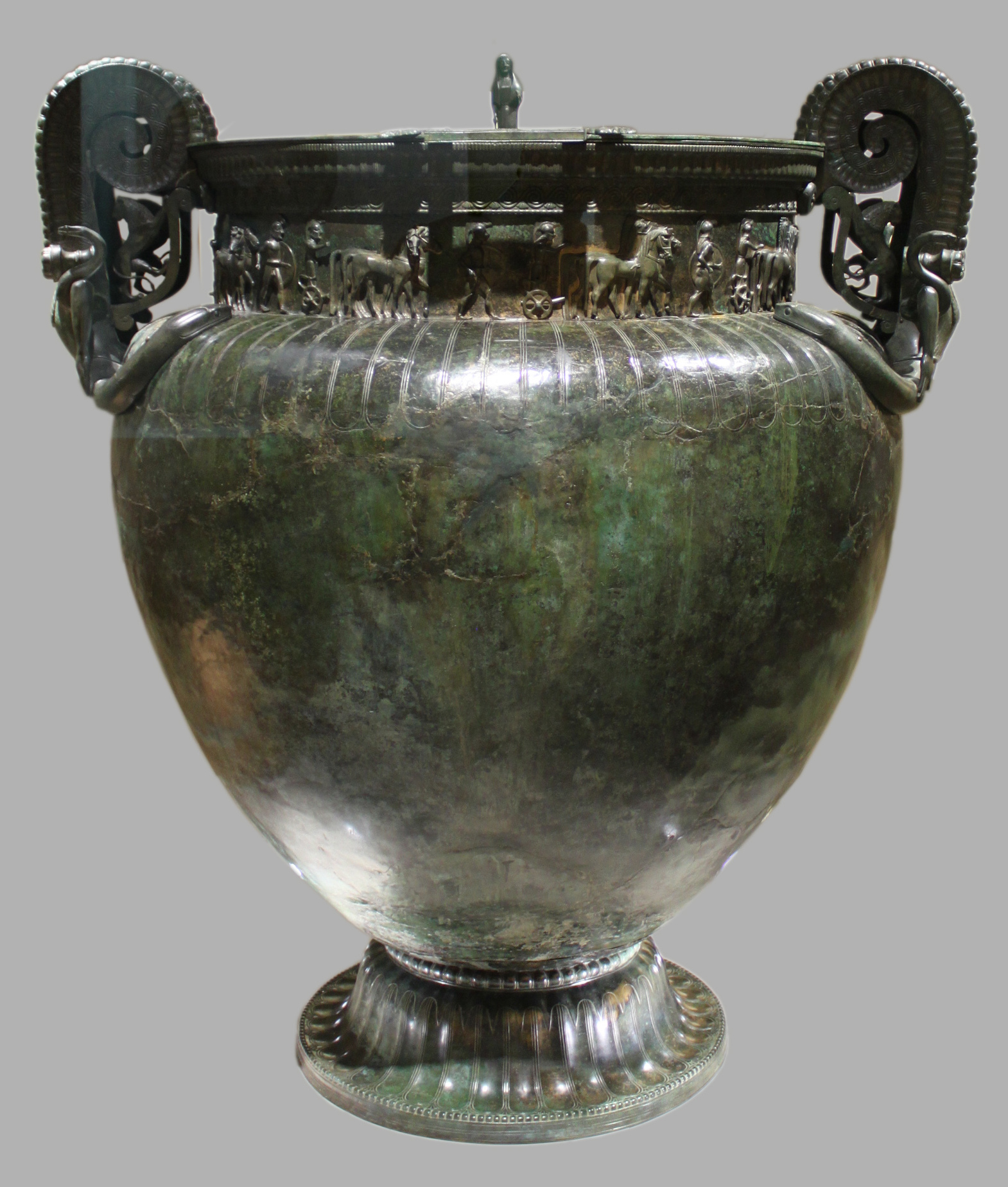
The Vix Krater, an imported Greek wine-mixing vessel found in the famous grave of the "Lady of Vix"

Archaeological finds are almost entirely burials; in the Hallstatt culture area, which is the dispersion area of this cultural material, especially at Dürrnberg near Hallein, this material can already be identified as Celtic in the Late Hallstatt phase (sixth century BC). The grave goods of female inhumations indicate cultural exchange with southern Europe, especially the North Italian Este and Villanovan cultures.

Female burials are associated with specific grave goods, such as combs, mirrors, toiletries (nail cutters, tweezers, ear spoons), spinning whorls (flywheel of a pindle, a tool for making yarn,) pottery vessels, necklaces, earrings, hairpins, cloak pins, finger rings, bracelets and other jewellery. A large majority of graves have no gender-specific grave goods, but where such goods are found, they almost always belong to female graves.

The Vix Grave from modern France is the most famous rich female burial, but there are several other significant ones. In the Vix Grave a huge bronze krater or mixing bowl was found which indicates the high status of the woman buried there. It derives from a Greek workshop and is 1.6 m high, weighs over 200 kg and has a volume of 1100 litres, making it the largest metal vessel to survive from the ancient world. In eight cremation graves from Frankfurt Rhine-Main from the middle and late La Tène period, which contained young girls, statues of dogs were found, measuring 2.1 to 6.7 cm in length. They were made of jet, clay, glass and bronze; their purpose, whether amulet, votive gift or toy, cannot be determined. There is evidence that in the earlier Celtic periods rich torcs of precious metal were mainly worn by females. Later, torcs are found almost exclusively in hoard contexts and gender cannot be determined; however, items like the Gundestrup cauldron dating between 150 BC and 1 BC show torcs being worn by both genders.

Another example of a richly furnished female grave is a grave chamber of the necropolis of Göblingen-Nospelt (Luxembourg), containing an amphora of fish sauce (garum fish sauce from Gades was a widely popular food seasoning), a bronze saucepan with strainer lid, a bronze cauldron, two bronze basins with a bronze bucket, a Terra sigillata plate, several clay cups and jugs, a mirror and eight fibulae.

Archaeological finds in the 19th century were often interpreted in light of contemporary ideas about gender without consideration of differences between modern and ancient cultures. Gender roles were assumed to be unalterable and, accordingly, grave goods were identified as "male" or "female" without ambiguity. Only when it became possible to determine the sex of human remains through osteological analysis was this approach revealed as overly simplistic.

=== Literary sources ===
Written evidence is first transmitted by the Greeks: the historian and geographer Hecataeus of Miletus (Periegesis), the seafarer and explorer Pytheas of Massilia (On the Ocean) (both of these works survive only in fragments), the geographer and ethnologist Herodotus (Histories) and the polymath Poseidonius (On the Ocean and its Problems). Nothing of Poseidonius' work survives directly; it is only transmitted as citations in other authors, such as Julius Caesar's (Commentarii de Bello Gallico). Other Greek writers include Diodorus Siculus (Bibliotheke), who used older sources, Plutarch (Moralia), who took a position on the role of women, and Strabo (Geography), who expanded on the work of Polybius (Histories) through personal travels and research.

Among the works of Roman historians are the universal history of Pompeius Trogus (Philippic History) which only survives in the epitome of Marcus Iunianus Iustinus. As a Gaul himself (he belonged to the Vocontii tribe), Trogus would have transmitted much of his information at first hand. Tacitus (Annals) described Britannia and its conquest by the Romans; Ammianus Marcellinus (Res Gestae) had served as a soldier in Gaul; Livy (Ab Urbe Condita) reported on Celtic culture; Suetonius (Lives of the Caesars) was also a Roman official and describes Caesar's Gallic Wars; and the senator and consul Cassius Dio (Roman History) recounted the campaign against the Celtic queen Boudicca. Julius Caesar had portrayed an image of the Celts in his Bellum Gallicum, tailored above all to his own domestic political purposes.

Among later historians, there is also Gerald of Wales who was born to a Cambro-Norman family in the 12th century and composed an important account of the history and geography of the British Isles.

== Social position ==
Irish: is ó mhnáibh do gabar rath nó amhrath

English: It is women who fortune or misfortune give.

— Irish proverb, Acallam na Senórach (The Colloquy of the Ancients)

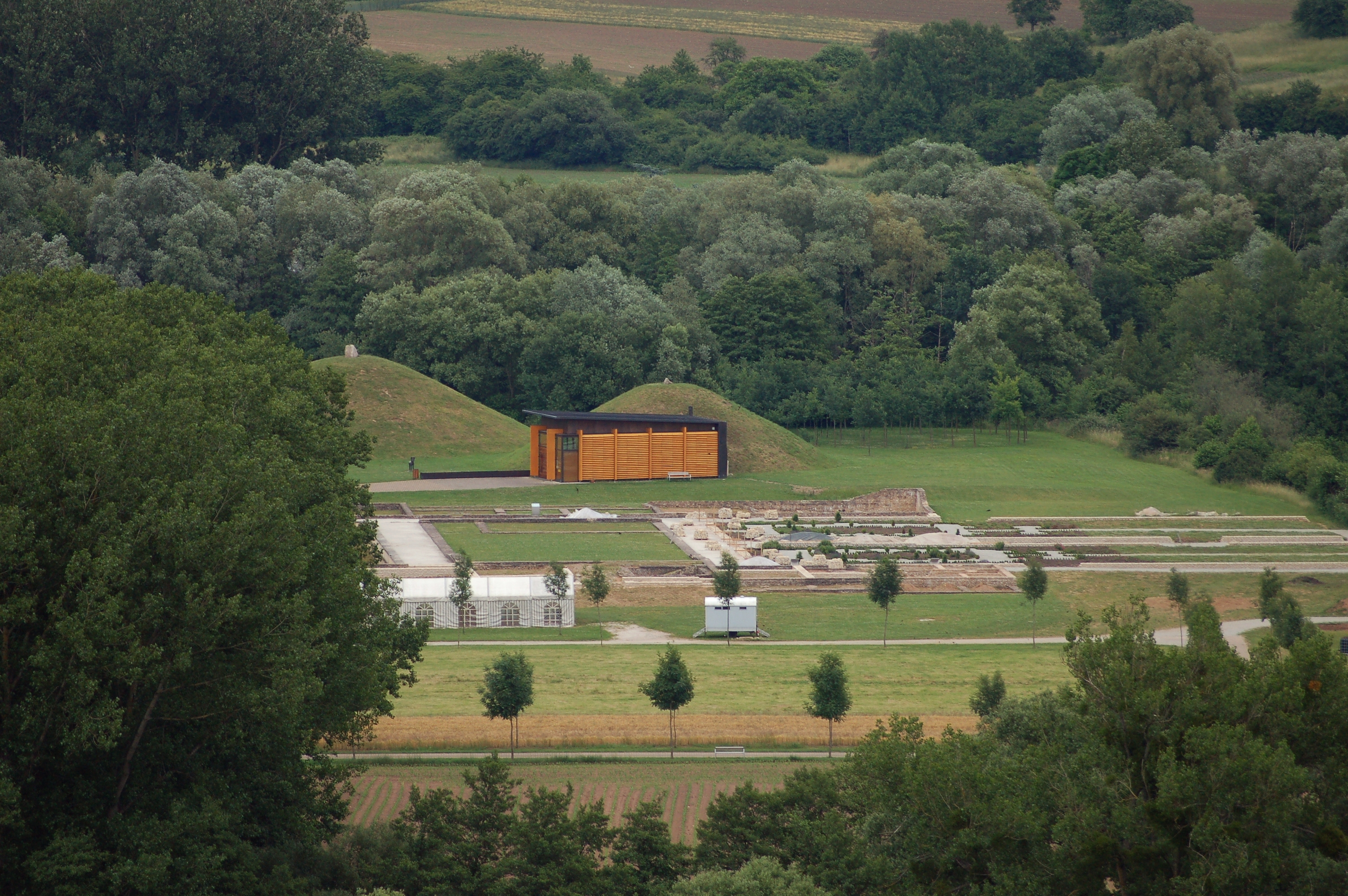
Princess Tomb of Reinheim

=== Women as secular and religious leaders ===
The social position of women differed by region and time period. The mainland Celtic "Princess" tombs of Bad Dürkheim, Reinheim, Waldalgesheim and Vix show that women could hold high social positions; but whether their position was a result of their marital status is unclear. Thus modern authors refer to them as both "ladies" and "princesses". The chariot found in the grave of an elite female person in Mitterkirchen im Machland is accompanied by valuable goods like those listed above. Plutarch names the women of Cisalpine Gaul as important judges of disputes with Hannibal. Caesar stresses the "power of life and death" held by husbands over their wife and children. Strabo mentions a Celtic tribe, in which the "Men and women dance together, holding each other's hands", which was unusual among Mediterranean peoples. He states that the position of the sexes relative to each other is "opposite... to how it is with us." Ammianus Marcellinus, in his description of the manners and customs of the Gauls, describes the furor heroicus (heroic fury) of the Gallic women, as "large as men, with flashing eyes and teeth bared."

Recent research has cast doubt on the significance of these ancient authors' statements. The position of Celtic women may have changed, especially under the influence of Roman culture and law, which saw the man as head of his household.

British female rulers, like Boudicca and Cartimandua, were seen as exceptional phenomena; the position of king (Proto-Celtic *rig-s) – in Gaul mostly replaced by two elected tribal leaders even before Caesar's time – was usually a male office. Female rulers did not always receive general approval. Thus, according to Tacitus, the Brigantes "goaded on by the shame of being yoked under a woman" revolted against Cartimandua; her marital disagreement with her husband Venutius and the support she received from the Romans likely played an important role in her maintenance of power. On the other hand, he says of Boudicca, before her decisive defeat, "[The Britons] make no distinction of gender in their leaders."

Whether a Celtic princess Onomaris (Ὀνόμαρις), mentioned in the anonymous Tractatus de Mulieribus Claris in bello ("Account of women distinguished in war"), was real, is uncertain. She is meant to have taken leadership when no men could be found due to a famine and to have led her tribe from the old homeland over the Danube and into southeastern Europe.

In later times, female cultic functionaries are known, like Celtic/Germanic seeress Veleda who has been interpreted by some Celtologists as a druids.). Celtic druidess, who prophesied to the Roman emperors Alexander Severus, Aurelian and Diocletian, enjoyed a high repute among the Romans.

On the lead Curse tablet from Larzac (c. 100 AD), which with over 1000 letters is the longest known text in the Gaulish language, communities of female magic users are named, containing 'mothers' (matīr) and 'daughters' (duxtīr), perhaps teachers and initiates respectively.

=== Female slaves ===
Slave women were mostly war booty, female property given up by insolvent debtors, or foreign captives and could be employed within the household or sold for profit. As slaves, women had an important economic role on account of their craft work, such that in Ireland, the word cumal ('slave woman', Old Welsh: aghell and caethverched) was also the term for a common measure of wealth (a cumal, worth ten sét ['cows']).

According to Caesar, favorite slaves were thrown on their masters' funeral pyres and burnt along with their corpses.

=== Childrearing ===
That caring for children was the role of the women is stated by ancient authors. In addition, in families of higher social standing, there was an institution of foster parentage (Old Irish: aite [foster father] and muimme [foster mother], similar to the Gothic atta [dear father], German Mama and English mummy), in which children of household were given away. The cost which the birth parents had to pay to the foster parents was higher for girls than for boys, because their care was considered more expensive. But there was also a form of foster parentage in which no fee was charged, designed to tighten the links between two families.

=== Matrilineality ===
Matrilineality (the transmission of property through the female line) is not attested for the Celts either. In a matrilineal society, children are related only to the family of the mother not to the family of the father. Irish clans (fine, compare with the Old High German word wini, 'friend') were patrilineal. The relatives of the mother had only a few rights and duties relating to the children. They received only a seventh of the weregild if a child was killed and the male relatives had a duty to seek vengeance for the deed.

Describing the Celtic expansion into southern and southeastern Europe around 600 BC, Livy claims that the two war leaders Bellovesus and Segovesus elected by the army were the sons of the sister of Ambicatus, king of the Bituriges. Here matrilineality could be a reason for the selection of these leaders, rather than the king's own sons. There is possible evidence of some matrilineal elites in the Hallstatt material culture. Among the possibly Celtiberian, Gallaeci, women are recorded to have had an important role in the family and the clan, indicated by frequent matrilineal succession among them. Men had important status among the Gallaeci as soldiers. Strabo's description of the possibly Celtiberian Cantabri also implies matriliny, although there's little evidence of it after the Roman conquest.

In southern Britain, the Late Iron Age Durotriges sometimes buried women with substantial grave goods. A recent genetic analysis of Bronze Age and Iron Age skeletons from the British Isles published in 2025 has shown some evidence that some Celtic tribes in Britain gradually transitioned from patrilineal and patrilocal societies to become matrilocal and matrilineal. This may be due to men's absence during warfare. Researchers analyzed 57 ancient genomes from Durotrige burial sites and found an extended kin group centered around a single maternal lineage, with unrelated (presumably inward migrating) burials being mostly male. A 2026 study of the Arras culture presented evidence for matriclans, matrilineality and matrilocality during the Iron Age in the British Islands. Among the Picts, according to some accounts, kingship was inherited through the maternal line and restricted to male descendents of the matriline.

== Legal position ==
Nearly all of the following legal matters seem to have been similar, with some regional variation, both on the mainland and in the British Isles.

=== General legal position ===
General legal equality – not just equality between men and women – was unusual among the Celts; it was only a possibility within social classes, which were themselves gender-defined. Celtic women were originally not allowed to serve as legal witnesses and could not conclude contracts with the assistance of a man. In the law and proverb collections Críth Gablach ('The split cow') and Bretha Crólige ('Decisions concerning blood guilt'), the wergeld was specified exactly for men and women of different social classes and the compensation for women (or their heirs in the event of their death) was significantly smaller, often half the cost for a man of the same class.

=== Marriage law ===
In British Celtic law, women had in many respects (for instance marriage law) a better position than Greek and Roman women. According to Irish and Welsh law, attested from the Early Middle Ages, a woman was always under the authority of a man, first her father, then her husband, and, if she was widowed, her son. She could not normally give away or pass on her property without their agreement. Her marriage was arranged by her male relatives, divorce and polygyny (the marriage of one man to several women) were controlled by specific rules. Polyandry (the marriage of one woman to several men) was unusual, although some Celtologists conclude that it sometimes occurred from the Irish saga Longas mac nUislenn (The Exile of the Sons of Uislius).

Caesar provides an example of the subordinate position of women: according to him, men had the power of life and death over their wives, as they did over their children, in a similar manner to the Roman pater familias. If the head of a high ranking family died, his relatives would gather and interrogate the wives as well as the slaves, when the death seemed suspicious. Should they consider their suspicions to be correct, they would burn the wives, after torturing them in every possible way. However, he also describes the financial role of the wives as remarkably self-sufficient.

Caesar also says that among the Britons, up to a dozen men (father, sons and brothers) could jointly possess their women. The resulting children would be assigned to whichever man was willing to marry the woman. Today this is seen as a common cliche of ancient barbarian ethnography and political propaganda intended by Caesar to provide a moral justification for his campaigns.

In general, monogamy was common. Having several legal wives was limited to the higher social classes. Since marriage was seen as a normal agreement between two people (cain lanamna, 'agreement of two'), it could be dissolved by both partners. A "temporary marriage" was also common. The position of the wife (Irish: cét-muinter, 'first of the household', or prím-ben, 'chief woman') was determined by the size of the dowry she brought with her. There were three kinds of marriage: that in which the woman brought more than the man, that in which both brought about equal amounts and finally that in which the woman brought less. If the husband wished to carry out a clearly unwise transaction, the wife possessed a sort of veto power. In a divorce, the wife usually had full control over her dowry. The concubine (Irish: adaltrach, cf. Latin adultera, 'adultress') had much less power and was subordinate to the main wife. She had a legal duty (Lóg n-enech) to assist the first wife in case of illness and could be harassed and injured by her with impunity for the first three days after her marriage, with only very restricted rights of self-defence (pulling hair, scratching and punching back). After these three days, the ordinary punishments would apply to both in the event of injury or murder.

Adultery by the wife, unlike adultery by the husband, could not be atoned for with a fine. A divorce in the case of adultery could only occur with the agreement of both parties and the wife was not permitted to seek one so long as her husband maintained intimate relations with her. If she was pregnant with her husband's child, she could not have intercourse with other men before the birth of the child, even if thrown out by him. These rules were binding for Celtic noblewomen, but they may have been less strictly binding on the lower classes. In Wales, the wife was allowed to leave her husband if he committed adultery three times, if he was impotent, and if he had bad halitosis taking with her the property which she had brought into the marriage or acquired during it. A rape had to be atoned for by the culprit by handing over the sort of gifts customarily given at a wedding and paying a fine since it was considered a form of "temporary" marital tie.

=== Inheritance law ===
The inheritance law of the British Celts disadvantaged women, especially daughters, in similar ways to marriage law. Only if the inheritance came from the mother or if the daughters originated from the last marriage of a man and the sons from an earlier marriage, were the two genders treated the same.

A daughter inherits no land from her father, except if she has no brothers, if she is an inheriting-daughter (ban-chomarba), and even then she inherits only for her lifetime.

— Josef Weisweiler, Die Stellung der Frau bei den Kelten. pp. 227 f.

After that, the inheritance returned to her paternal relatives (Fine). This institution of the 'inheriting-daughter' has a parallel in ancient Indian law, in which a father without sons could designate his daughter as a putrikā (son-like daughter).

In Gallic law, widows (old Irish: fedb, Welsh: gweddwn, Cornish gwedeu, Breton: intañvez) inherited the entire property left behind by their husband. They could dispose of this property freely, unlike in Old Irish law, in which the widow was under the control of her sons. Only a right to make gifts and a restricted power of sale were granted to her, which was called the bantrebthach ('female householder'). The right to make gifts was restricted to transfers within the family.

Welsh women only received the right to inherit under king Henry II of England (1133–1189).

=== Cáin Adomnáin ===
The abbot and saint Adomnan of Iona produced the legal work Cáin Adomnáin (The Canon of Adomnan) or Lex Innocentium (The law of the innocents) on the property of women (especially mothers) and children. He describes the condition of women up till that point, with self-aware exaggeration, as cumalacht (enslavement), to highlight the importance of his own work. Adomnan reports that a woman who:

... had to stay in a pit so deep that her genitals were covered and had to hold a spit over the fire so long for it to be roasted, further she had to serve as a candlestick holder till it was time to sleep. In battle, she carried her rations on one shoulder and her young child on the other. On her back she bore a 30-foot long pole with an iron hook, with which she would grab opponent amongst her enemies by their braids. Behind her came her husband, who drove her into battle with a fence post. As trophies one took the head or the breasts of the women.

— Adomnan, Cáin Adomnáin

According to legend, an experience of Adomnan and his mother had been the impetus for this legal text. The view of a slain Celtic woman and her child—"mother's blood and milk streaming over"—on the battlefield, shocked his mother so much that she forced her son, by fasting, to compose this law book and to present it to the princes.

== Sexuality ==
In the Trencheng Breth Féne (The Triad of Irish Verdicts, a collection of writings dating from the 14th to the 18th centuries) the three female virtues were listed as virginity before marriage, willingness to suffer, and industriousness in caring for her husband and children.

The ancient authors regularly describe Celtic women as large, crafty, brave and beautiful. Diodorus and Suetonius, in particular, describe the sexual permissiveness of Celtic women. According to Suetonius, Caesar spent a lot of money on sexual experiences in Gaul. His legionnaires sang in the triumph that he had seduced a horde of Gallic women, calling him a "bald whoremonger".

Celtic women were described as fertile, prolific and good breastfeeders. These are all clichés of the Greeks and Romans about barbarian peoples. Gerald of Wales describes how the Irish are "the most jealous people in the world", while the Welsh lacked this jealousy and among them guest-friendship-prostitution was common. In the Irish saga of Conchobar mac Nessa, the king is said to have the right to the first night with any marriageable woman and the right to sleep with the wife of anyone who hosted him. This is called the Geis of the king. Whether this right actually existed and was exercised by the Celts is not attested outside the sagas. In the saga Immram Curaig Maíle Dúin (The Sea Voyage of Maíle Dúin), the conception of the main character occurs when a random traveller sleeps with a nun of a cloister. She says before this "our act is not beneficial if this is finally the time when I conceive!" The suggestion that Irish women used this knowledge for birth control, sometimes drawn from this is questionable. Large numbers of children are mentioned among the Celts by the ancient authors.

The statement of Gerald of Wales that incest had a pervasive presence in the British Isles is false according to modern scholars, since he complains only that a man can marry his cousins in the fifth, fourth and third degrees. Incest played a key role in British Celtic myth, such as in Tochmarc Étaíne ('The Courting of Étaín') as in other ancient cultures (like Ancient Egypt or the pair of Zeus and Hera in classical Greece). In actual social life, however, a notable meaning cannot be found.

== Health ==
Palaeopathological research based on bone samples and, in the best-case scenario, on mummified corpses indicates illnesses found among the ancient Celts. Diseases like sinusitis, meningitis and dental caries leave typical traces. Growth disorders and vitamin deficiencies can be detected from the long bones. Coproliths (fossilised fecal matter) indicate severe worm infections. In total, the data indicates a society which, as a result of poor hygiene and diet, suffered from weak immune systems and a high rate of illness. This is even more marked in women than in men and was quite normal for people of this time and area. Among Celtic women degenerative damage to the joints and spinal column were particularly notable on account of the amount of heavy lifting they did. Trauma from violence was more common among men. Differences as a result of social position are not visible. The "Lady of Vix" was a young Celtic woman of exceptionally high standing, who suffered from pituitary adenoma and otitis media.

Skeletal finds in graves provide the following age statistics for the ancient Celts: the average age at death was 35 years old; 38 for men and 31 for women.

== Appearance of Celtic women ==
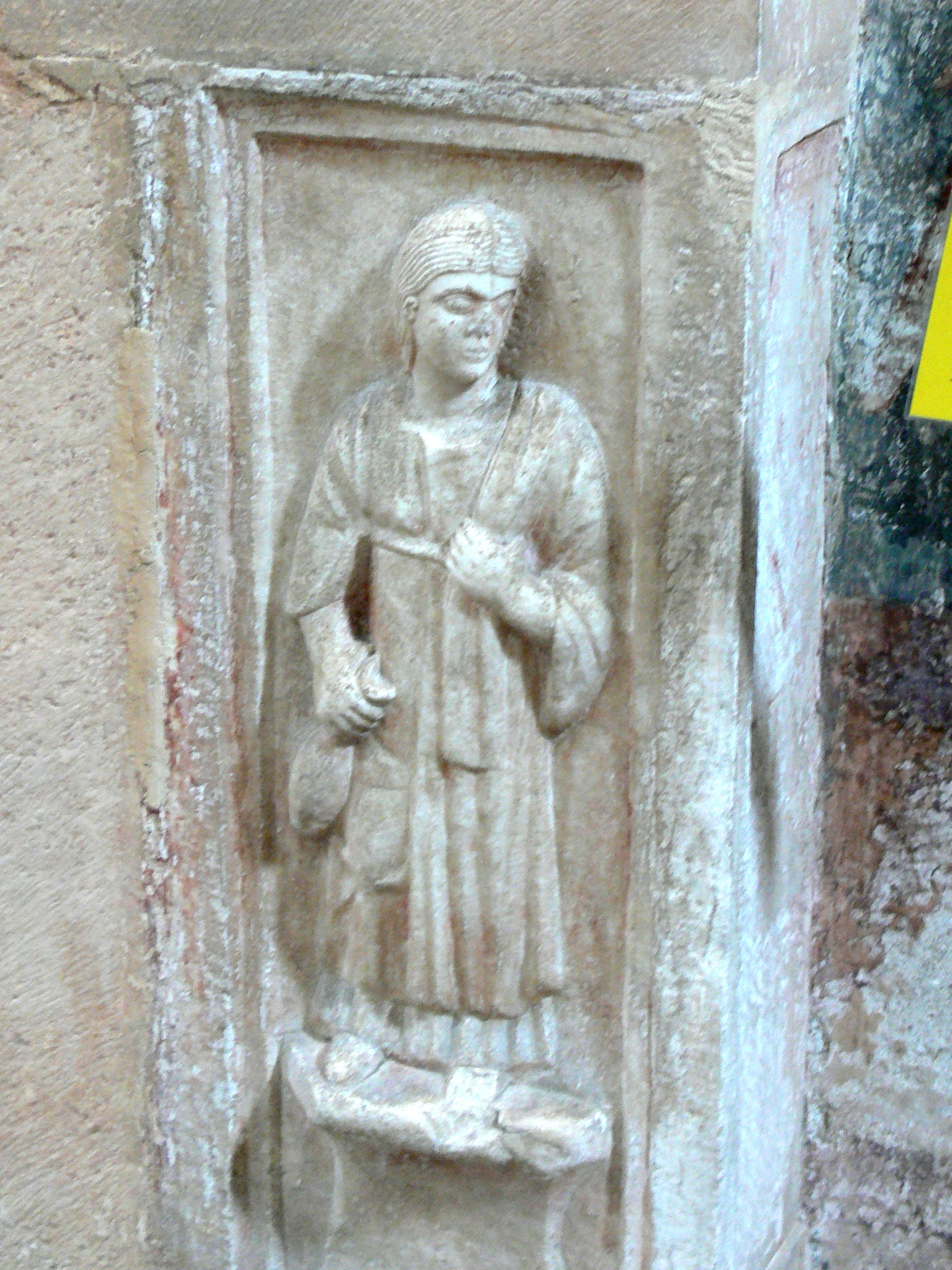
Celtic farmwoman (Gurk, Carinthia)

=== Clothing ===
On account of the poor survival rate of materials (cloth, leather) used for clothing, there is only a little archaeological evidence; contemporary images are rare. The descriptions of ancient authors are rather generalistic; only Diodorus transmits something more detailed. According to his report, normal clothing of Celtic men and women was made from very colourful cloth, often with a gold-embroidered outer layer and held together with golden fibulae.

The women's tunic was longer than the men's; a leather or metal belt (sometimes a chain) was tied around the waist. The regional variation in fashion (as well as differences based on age and class) were more complex than the simple tunic. The boldly patterned dresses seen on vases from Sopron in Pannonia were cut like a kind of knee-length maternity dress from stiff material with bells and fringes attached. Tight-waisted skirts with bells in the shape of a crinoline are also depicted. An overdress with a V-shaped cut which was fixed at the shoulders with fibulae was found in Noricum. The chain around the waist had hooks for length adjustments, the leftover chain was hung on a chain-link in a loop. The links of this chain-belt could be round, figure-8 shaped, with cross-shaped or flat intermediate links, doubled, tripled, or more with enamel inlays (see Blood enamel). The so-called Norican-Pannonian belt of Roman times was decorated with open-worked fittings. A pouch was often hung from the belt on the right side.

In the British Isles during the Iron Age, ring-headed pins were often used in place of fibulae on dresses and for fixing hairdos in place. This is demonstrated by the different positions the needles are found in burials.

On a first century AD Celtic gravestone from Wölfnitz, a girl is depicted in Norican clothing. It consists of a straight under-dress (Peplos) which reaches to the ankles, a baggy overdress reaching to the knees, which is fastened at the shoulders with large fibulae. A belt with two ribbons hanging down at the front holds the dress in place. In her right hand she holds a basket, in her left hand she holds a mirror up before her face. On her feet there are pointed shoes. Her hair is mostly straight, but coiffed at the back.

In everyday life, Celtic women wore wooden or leather sandals with small straps (Latin: gallica, 'Gallic shoe'). Bound shoes made from a single piece of tanned leather tied together around the ankle are often only detectable in graves from the metal eyelets and fasteners which survive around the feet.

Three mannequins with reconstructed Helvetic/Celtic women's outfits were displayed in the exhibition Gold der Helvetier – Keltische Kostbarkeiten aus der Schweiz (Gold of the Helvetii: Celtic Treasures from Switzerland) at the Landesmuseum Zürich in 1991.

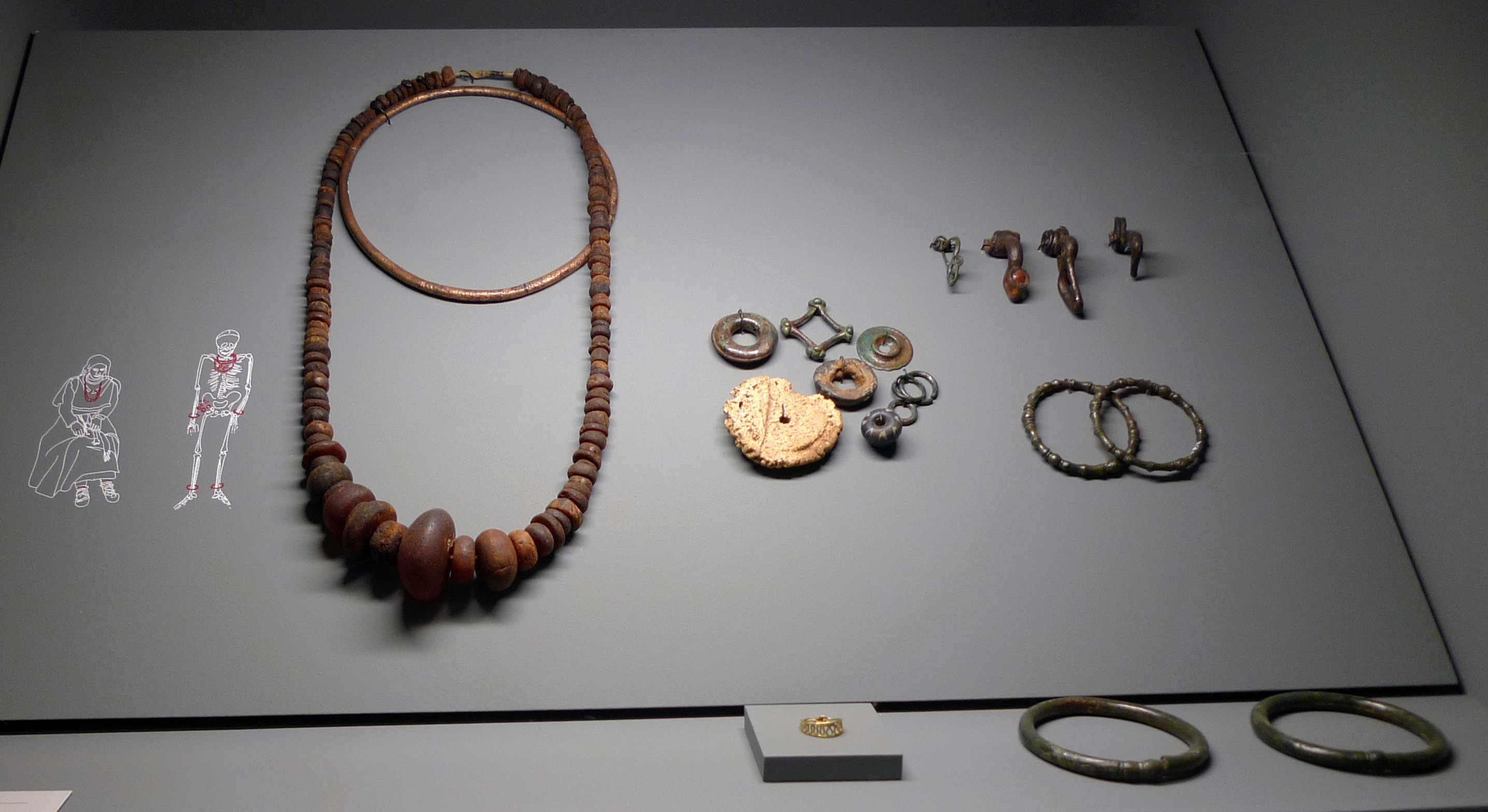
Grave goods, amber and gold (Münsingen-Rain cemetery)

=== Jewelry ===
Gold jewelry (necklaces, bracelets, rings) were worn as symbols of social class and were often of high craftsmanship and artistic quality. Girls of the Hallstatt and early La Tène culture wore amber chains and amulets as individual chains or multiple string colliers; the colliers had up to nine strings and over a hundred amber beads. Amulets were both decoration and apotropaic charms. They were probably added to the tombs of women who were killed violently, to protect the living. Torcs (neck rings) are found in graves of important men and women up to about 350 BC, after that they are usually restricted to male graves. The "Lady" from the tomb at Vix had a torc, placed on her lap, as a grave good; the woman in the tomb at Reinheim wore one around her neck. Boudicca, Queen of the Iceni in Britain around 60 BC is described as wearing a torc, which might reflect her exceptional circumstances as a war leader or be an embellishment of the Roman chronicler.

Over a colourful shirt she wore a twisted gold torc and a thick cloak closed with a fibula.

— Cassius Dio, Roman History 62.2.4

The Hallstatt-period limestone statue of a Celtic woman found at the entrance to the tomb of the "Lady of Vix" wears a torc and sits on a throne.

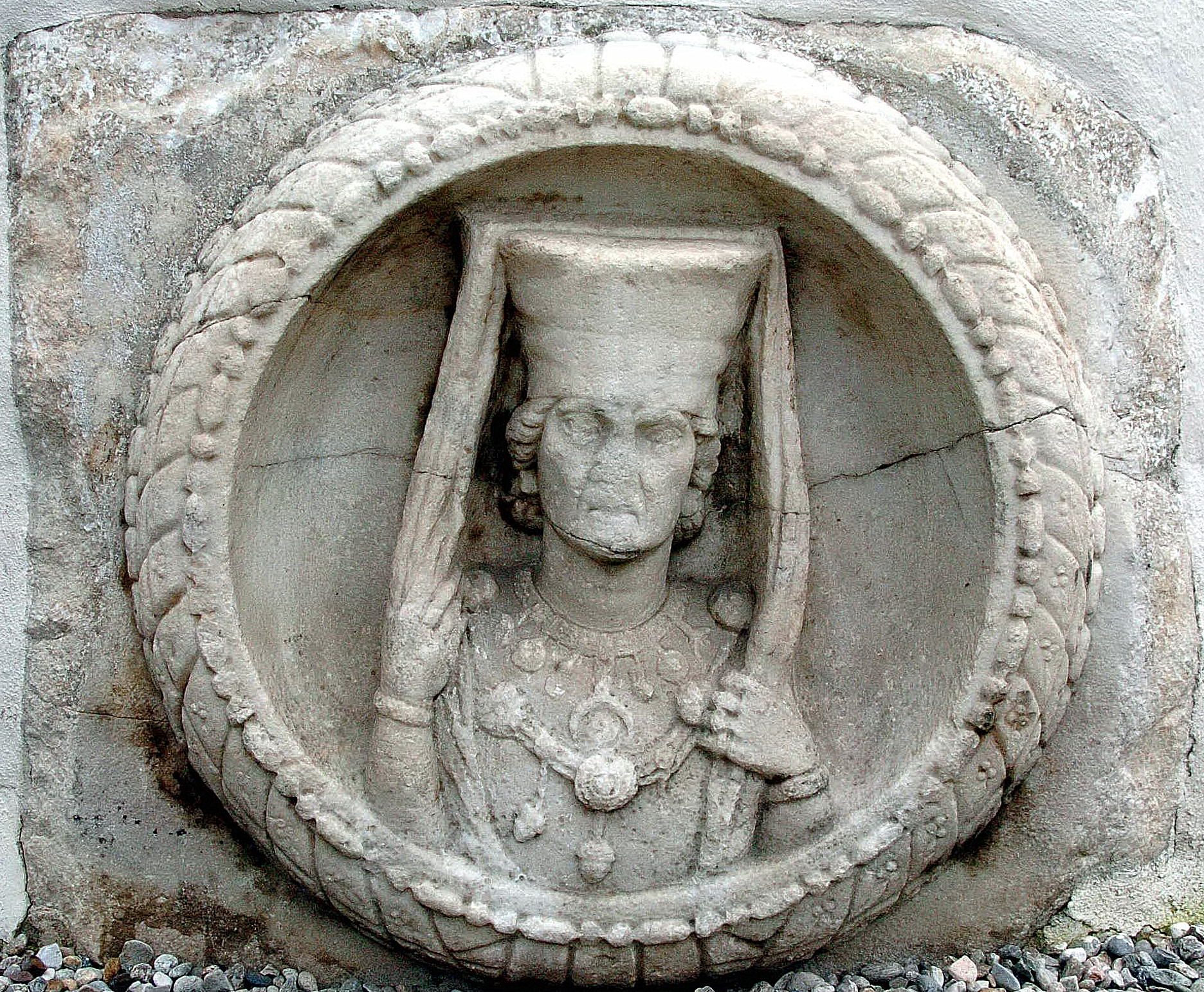
Bust of a Norican woman with a Modius cap, Wölfnitz-Lendorf, Carinthia)

=== Head coverings and hairstyles ===
Since almost no depictions of women survive from the La Tène period, archaeologists must make do with Roman provincial images. In these, women are seldom depicted bare-headed, so that more is known about headcoverings than about hairstyles. Celtic women of this time wore winged caps, felt caps in the shape of upturned cones with veils, cylinder-shaped fur caps, bronze tiaras or circlets. The modius cap was a stiff cap shaped like an inverted cone which was especially common in the first century AD around Virunum. It was worn with a veil and rich decoration and indicated women of the upper class. The veil worn over the cap was often so long that it could cover the entire body. In north Pannonia at the same time, women wore a fur cap, with a spiked brim, a veil cap similar to the Norican one and in later times a turban-like head covering with a veil. Among the Celtiberian women a structure, which consisted of a choker with rods extending up over the head and a veil stretched over the top for shade, was fashionable.

The hair was often shaved above the oiled forehead. In the Hallstatt period, hairnets have been found; in some accounts, individual emphasised braids (up to three) are mentioned, but most women tied their hair back in a braid. The hair was often coloured red or blonde. The seer Fedelm in Irish sagas is described with three braids, two tied around her head and one hanging from the back of her head down to her calves. Unlike married women, unmarried women usually wore the hair untied and without a headcovering.

Hair needles for fixing caps and hairdos in place are common grave finds from the late Hallstatt period. They have ring-shaped heads which could be richly decorated in some regions. From the La Tène period, such needles are only rarely found.

== Women in Celtic mythology ==
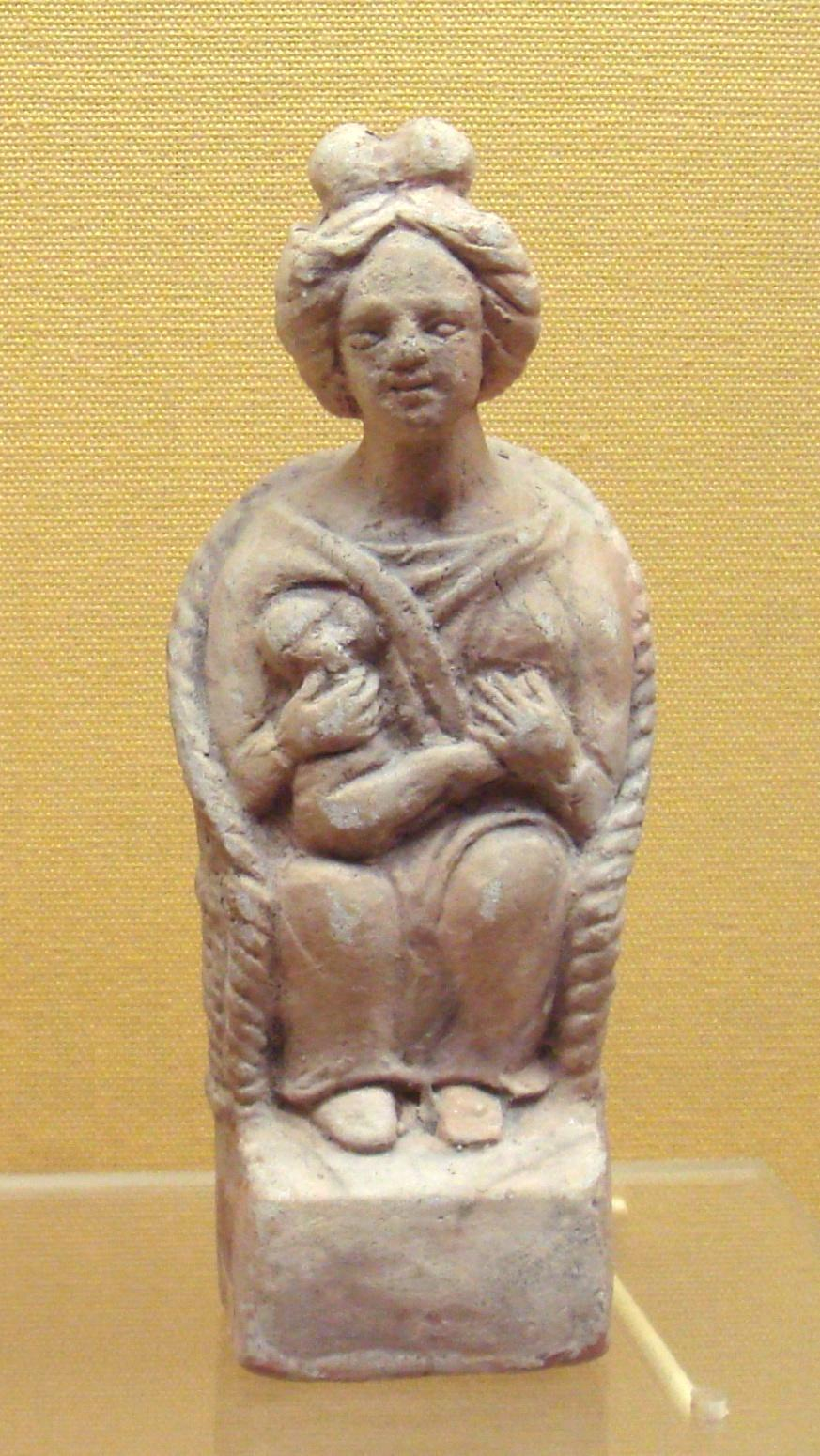
Matrona (National Archaeology Museum, England)

In the mainland Celtic area, a great number of goddesses are known; on account of the lack of political unity of the Celts, they seem to have been regional deities. Unlike the Greeks and Romans, the Celts never had a single pantheon, although the Romans attempted to connect them up on the basis of their functions, through the Interpretatio Romana. The mother goddesses which had great importance in Celtic religion were also united in this way under the names Matres and Matronae.

In the mythology of the British Celts almost no goddesses are present. The female figures named in the local Irish sagas mostly derive from female figures of the historically unattested migrations period, which are recounted in the Lebor Gabála Érenn (Book of the Taking of Ireland). They were originally described as mythic people, transformed into deities and later into demons after their respective expulsions by the following wave of invaders – mostly these resided in the Celtic Otherworld. An enumeration of the most important female figures of history (not exclusively Irish) is found in the account of the poet Gilla Mo-Dutu Ó Caiside which is known as the Banshenchas (contains 1147 entries). A similar development occurred in Britain, especially in Wales.

Very often these mythic female figures embody sovereignty over the land or the land itself (see hieros gamos). Examples from Ireland include Macha and Medb, from Wales, Rhiannon. The dispute between Medb and her husband Ailill mac Máta over the wealth brought into the marriage by each of them is the indirect trigger for the Táin Bó Cuailnge (The Cattle Raid of Cooley).

All kinds of legal issues in marriage are described in the Celtic myths: The marriage of a sister by her brother (Branwen ferch Llŷr, 'Branwen, daughter of Llŷr'), the marriage of a widowed mother by her son (Manawydan fab Llŷr, 'Manawydan, the son of Llŷr'), rape and divorce (Math fab Mathonwy, 'Math, the son of Mathonwy'), marriage of a daughter against the will of her father (Culhwch and Olwen). If the girl objected to the marriage, the only way out is self-help: the imposition of almost impossible tasks on the prospective groom (Tochmarc Emire, 'The Wooing of Emer'); escape with a husband of her own choosing (The Pursuit of Diarmuid and Gráinne), or suicide (Longas mac nUislenn, 'The Exile of the son of Uislius').

The already mentioned Queen of Connacht, Medb, broke with all conventions and selected her own husbands, whom she later repudiated when she tired of them. To each warrior from whom she desired support, she promised the 'Favour of her leg' (Lebor Gabála Érenn) and even marriage to her daughter Findabair – when Findabair discovers this, she takes her own life out of shame.

Other female figures from Celtic mythology include the weather witch Cailleach (Irish for 'nun,' 'witch,' 'the veiled' or 'old woman') of Scotland and Ireland, the Corrigan of Brittany who are beautiful seductresses, the Irish Banshee (woman of the Otherworld) who appears before important deaths, the Scottish warrior women Scáthach, Uathach and Aoife. The Sheela-na-Gig was a common grotesque sculpture which presented an exaggerated vulva. Her significance – ultimately as a fertility symbol – is debated and her dating is uncertain. Possibly the display of the vulva was meant to have an apotropaic power, as in the Irish legend in which the women of Ulster led by Mugain the wife of King Conchobar mac Nessa unveil their breasts and vulvae to prevent the destruction of Emain Macha by the raging Cú Chulainn.

=== Claims of Matriarchy ===
The traditional view of the medieval Irish sagas and contemporary authors was that the mythic and historical Celtic queens such as Boudicca, Cartimandua and Onomarix were individual exceptions in unusual situations. A few modern scholars dispute this view. They argue that Romans found the higher status of women among the Celts remarkable.

The idea of a Celtic matriarchy first developed in the 18th and 19th centuries in connection with the romantic idea of the "Noble Savage". According to 19th-century Unilineal evolutionism, societies developed from a general promiscuity to matriarchy and then to patriarchy. Heinrich Zimmer's in 'The Matriarchy of the Picts and Scots' (1894) argued for the existence of a matriarchy in Northern Ireland and Scotland. The evidence was British Celtic sagas about great queens and warrior maidens. The contents of these sagas were falsely presented as related to the reality of the relationship between the sexes.

In 1938, in his work Die Stellung der Frau bei den Kelten und das Problem des keltischen Mutterrechts (The Position of the Woman among the Celts and the problem of the Celtic Matriarchy), Josef Weisweiler argued that there was as much knowledge about the Celts of the British Islands as there is on the mainland. The Celtic cultures on the mainland were, for sure, always patriarchal, and there's no reason to think the Celts in Britain were different.

The feminist author Heide Göttner-Abendroth assumes a Celtic matriarchy in Die Göttin und ihr Heros (1980), but its existence remains unsubstantiated. Marion Zimmer Bradley depicted a matriarchal reinterpretation of the stories of King Arthur, Lancelot and the Holy Grail in The Mists of Avalon (1987), which were dominated by the female characters. She employed the contrast between the Celtic matriarchal culture and the Christian patriarchy as a theme of her work. Ingeborg Clarus attempted in her book Keltische Mythen (1991) to reduce the Celtic sagas of Britain to a battle between the sexes, as part of her theory about the replacement of a matriarchy by a patriarchy. She thus continues the evolutionary theories of the 19th century. She claims that matriarchy is the pre-Celtic heritage of Ireland and that the transition to patriarchy took place in the 1st century AD in the time of King Conchobar mac Nessa of Ulster.

== Bibliography ==
- Josef Weisweiler: "Die Stellung der Frau bei den Kelten und das Problem des "keltischen Mutterrechts"." Zeitschrift für celtische Philologie, Vol. 21, 1938.

General works on the Celts

- Helmut Birkhan: Kelten. Versuch einer Gesamtdarstellung ihrer Kultur. Verlag der Österreichischen Akademie der Wissenschaften, Wien 1997, ISBN 3-7001-2609-3.
- Helmut Birkhan: Kelten. Bilder ihrer Kultur. Verlag der Österreichischen Akademie der Wissenschaften, Wien 1999, ISBN 3-7001-2814-2.
- Alexander Demandt: Die Kelten. C. H. Beck'sche Verlagsbuchhandlung, München 1998, ISBN 3-406-43301-4.
- Arnulf Krause: Die Welt der Kelten, 2nd Edition 2007, Campus Verlag, Frankfurt/New York, ISBN 978-3-593-38279-1.
- Bernhard Maier: Geschichte und Kultur der Kelten. C. H. Beck, München 2012, ISBN 978-3-40-664140-4.
- Wolfgang Meid: Die Kelten. Reclam, Stuttgart 2007, ISBN 978-3-15-017053-3.

Particular aspects of Celtic culture

- Helmut Birkhan: Nachantike Keltenrezeption. Praesens Verlag, Wien 2009, ISBN 978-3-7069-0541-1.
- David Rankin: Celts and the Classic World. Croom Helm Ltd. 1987, Paperback 1996 by Routledge, London/New York, ISBN 0-415-15090-6.
- Ingeborg Clarus: Keltische Mythen. Der Mensch und seine Anderswelt. Walter Verlag, Freiburg im Breisgau 1991 (Patmos Verlag, Düsseldorf, 2000, 2nd edition) ISBN 3-491-69109-5.

Reference works on the Celts

- Sylvia und Paul F. Botheroyd: Lexikon der keltischen Mythologie. Tosa Verlag, Wien 2004.
- Bernhard Maier: Lexikon der keltischen Religion und Kultur. Kröner, Stuttgart 1994, ISBN 3-520-46601-5.
- Susanne Sievers/Otto Helmut Urban/Peter C. Ramsl: Lexikon zur Keltischen Archäologie. A–K und L–Z. Mitteilungen der prähistorischen Kommission im Verlag der Österreichischen Akademie der Wissenschaften, Wien 2012, ISBN 978-3-7001-6765-5.

Matriarchal religion

- Heide Göttner-Abendroth: Die Göttin und ihr Heros. Die matriarchalen Religionen in Mythen, Märchen, Dichtung, München 1980, last edition Verlag Frauenoffensive, 1993, ISBN 978-3-88-104234-5.
