= The Griffin (fairy tale) =

German fairy tale

Folk tale
- Name: The Griffin
- Aarne–Thompson grouping: ATU 610; ATU 461
- Country: Germany
- Published in: Grimms' Fairy Tales

"The Griffin" is a German fairy tale collected by the Brothers Grimm in Grimm's Fairy Tales (KHM 165).

It is Aarne-Thompson type 610, Fruit to Cure the Princess; and type 461, Three Hairs from the Devil. The Brothers Grimm noted its similarity to The Devil With the Three Golden Hairs.

The opening type is seldom a stand-alone tale; it combines with others, such as type 461, as in this, or type 570, the Rabbit Herd, as in The Three May Peaches, to form a complete tale. The opening also features in Jesper Who Herded the Hares.

== Textual source ==
"The Griffin" under the German title "Der Vogel Greif" first appeared in the third edition of Grimm's Fairy Tales (1837), supplied to the Brothers Grimm by Wilhelm Wackernagel. It was written down in Swiss dialect (Alemannic) from the oral tale told by Freidrich Schmidt. The correct Alemannic title was "Vogel Gryf", as in the printed text by Otto Sutermeister (1873).

== Synopsis ==
A king's daughter was ill, and it was foretold she would be made well by eating an apple. The king declared that whoever brought the apple to cure her would marry her. A peasant with three sons sent the oldest, Uele, with a basket of apples. On his journey, the boy met an iron man who asked him what was in the basket. The boy answering "Frogs' legs", the iron man made it so. When Uele reached the king, the basket did contain frogs' legs and the king drove him out.

The peasant then sent his second son, Seame, who encountered the iron man, answering "Hogs' bristles", and making the same discovery as his older brother and receiving the same reception.

The youngest son, Hans, who was rather a fool, begged to go until his father finally agreed. When Hans met the iron man, he said the basket contained the apples which the princess would eat to make herself well. The iron man said that it was so. The basket held apples when he reached the castle, and the princess was cured.

The king, however, refused to let them marry until he had a boat that traveled over dry land and sea. Hans went home and told his father. His father sent Uele to the forest to make such a ship; the iron man came to him and asked what he was making; when Uele said "Wooden bowls" that was what he made. Seame suffered the same fate, but when Hans told the iron man he was making a ship that would travel over land and sea, he made such a boat.

The king set Hans to catch a hundred hares in a meadow in one day. Hans did so, not losing any. The king sent a maid to beg one from him, for guests. Hans refused it, but said he would give one to the king's daughter. Then the iron man gave him a whistle that would summon any hare back. Hans gave the king's daughter a hare but then whistled it back.

The king sent Hans to fetch him a feather from the griffin's tail. On the way, a lord of a castle asked him to ask the griffin where was the lost key to his money chest; another lord, how their ill daughter could be cured; a giant, why he had to carry people over a lake. At the griffin's castle, he met the griffin's wife, who warned him that the griffin would eat him, but at night, he could pull out a feather, and then she would get the answers for him.

Hans did as she said, and when he pulled the feather, the griffin woke. The wife told him that a man had been there and gone away, but told her some stories first. She repeated them, and the griffin said that the key was in the wood house, under a log; that a toad had made a nest of the daughter's hair, but she would recover if they took the hair out; that the giant had only to put someone down in the middle of the lake and he would be free. Hans left and told the other lords what he had learned; they gave him rich treasures. When he reached the king, he claimed the griffin had given them. The king set out to get some, but he was the first man to reach the giant, who put him down in the lake, where he drowned. Hans married the princess and became king.

== Adaptations ==
=== Television ===
Elements from the story feature in the episode "The Luck Child" from Jim Henson's The Storyteller.

== See also ==
- The Fool of the World and the Flying Ship
- How the Hermit helped to win the King's Daughter
- The King Of Lochlin's Three Daughters
- The Swineherd
