= Clan Mother =

Clan Mother may refer to:

- Haudenosaunee Clan Mother
- North American Indigenous elder

== See also ==
- Haudenosaunee#Women in society
