= Mokri (surname) =

Mokri (Persian: مُکری) is an Iranian-Kurdish surname.

Notable people with the surname include:

- Amir Mokri, Iranian cinematographer
- Aziz Khan Mokri, Kurdish Military leader during the Qajar period in Iran.
- Mohammad Mokri, Iranian Kurdish scholar (Kurdologist)
- Mostafa Mokri, Iranian footballer
- Shahram Mokri, Iranian Kurdish writer
