= The First Sex =

Book by Elizabeth Gould Davis

- Author: Elizabeth Gould Davis
- Language: English
- Publication date: 1971
- Media type: Print
- Pages: 382
- OCLC: 206443

The First Sex is a 1971 book by the American librarian Elizabeth Gould Davis, considered part of the second wave of feminism. In the book, Gould Davis aimed to show that early human society consisted of matriarchal "queendoms" based around worship of the "Great Goddess", and characterised by pacifism and democracy. Gould Davis argued that the early matriarchal societies attained a high level of civilization, which was largely wiped out as a result of the "patriarchal revolution". She asserted that patriarchy introduced a new system of society, based on property rights rather than human rights, and worshipping a stern and vengeful male deity instead of the caring and nurturing Mother Goddess.

These views of Gould Davis on a Great Goddess predominating in Neolithic Europe and the Near East are similar to those made by a number of writers in the early and mid 20th-century, including Eric Neumann, Thorstein Veblen, Merlin Stone, Robert Graves, Marija Gimbutas, J. J. Bachofen, Walter Burket, James Mellart, Robert Briffault.

Although many of her views are considered unsupported by most anthropologists and archaeologists today, a number of writers have continued to develop the themes that Gould Davis originated.

== Synopsis ==
=== The "Gynecocratic" World ===
In the first part of The First Sex, Gould Davis used evidence from archaeology and anthropology to support a theory of matriarchal prehistory. The chapters in this section of the book focus on individual parts of the evidence for peaceful matriarchal queendoms: three are titled "Mythology Speaks", "Anthropology Speaks" and "Archaeology Speaks". Gould Davis said that the "loss of paradise" when the "Great Goddess" was replaced by a vengeful male deity is the theme of all surviving myth. She argued that evidence from the Neolithic site at Çatalhöyük showed there to be no wars or even violent death, and that even physical injury to animals may not have been permissible there. She pointed to other parts of the Mediterranean in which female tombs are preserved more carefully than male ones, and took this to be evidence of female primacy. In "Anthropology Speaks", Gould Davis focused on taboos, chiefly incest, and aimed to show how taboos against brother-sister relationships acted to protect women against violent men. She also argued that menstrual blood was originally sacred rather than polluting or "unclean", and that only when people began to eat meat did men become bigger than women, because of selection of weak women by men.

=== The Patriarchal Revolution ===
In this section of the book, Gould Davis examined how mythology and society changed as a result of a suggested violent conversion from matriarchy to patriarchy. Her theory proposed that patriarchal revolution resulted from the violent invasion of nomadic tribes who were warlike and destructive, overrunning the peaceful, egalitarian matriarchies. These nomads (Semites from the Arabian Peninsula) are argued to have never achieved a civilization of their own, but only to have destroyed or taken over older ones. Gould Davis asserted that many tales in the Old Testament were actually rewritings of older stories, with goddesses changed to male actors, or a goddess raped or overthrown and her powers usurped by the new father deity. This, she suggested, was part of a concerted effort to wipe out all evidence of female authority. Because the violent invaders wished to establish the a patrilineal system of inheritance, rigorous control of women's sexuality became paramount. Thus, women's right to sexual pleasure was redefined as sinful, and virginity was conceived of as a property right of a woman's father or husband. Gould Davis discussed female circumcision as a means to protect the virginity of women and assure clear lines of paternity. This practice is described in the book in graphic detail, as performed with unsterilized instruments, without anaesthesia (conditions pertaining to all surgical practices before the nineteenth century).

=== Pre-Christian Women in the Celtic-Ionian World ===
In this part of the book, Gould Davis focused on the role of women in the ancient civilizations of Crete and Mycenae. Her research suggested to her that, as in her model of prehistoric civilization, women were the primary powers. The book saw the Cretan and Mycenaean civilizations as remnants of the ancient pre-Christian Celtic culture, which Gould Davis also believed to have granted women a great deal of power. She claimed, for example, that the monarchy was matrilineal, and that most of the tribal chiefs were women rather than men.

Gould Davis claimed that Greek women possessed rights that are presently denied by the Catholic, Orthodox, and conservative Protestant churches, such as the rights to abortion and divorce. She cited many well-known historians to support these claims. She also argued that women participated in almost all aspects of ancient Greek and Roman society, including government, learning and sport. In the following chapter, "The Celts", she argued that similar rights prevailed until the collapse of the Roman Empire, for a matrilineal system of monarchical descent, and for Celtic women being the major preservers of learning during the early Middle Ages.

=== The Tragedy of Western Women ===
The final part of The First Sex focused on the period since Christianity became the state religion of the Roman Empire in 313 A.D. Gould Davis aimed with this part of the book to show how Semitic myths of male supremacy were preached by the early Church Fathers to a Pagan people who would not believe them and did not take them seriously until Constantine became emperor. Gould Davis believed that the writings of Paul in the New Testament were used by the Church to justify violence against women, leading throughout the Middle Ages to a level of cruelty and barbarity unheard of in previous ages. Gould Davis believed that once Christianity had attained civil power, the demotion of women and the "terrible materialism that marks and mars our present civilization" were inevitable. She argued that the influence of Mary as a "Goddess" grew as the violent imposition of Christianity erased the ancient Goddess religion. Quoting Jules Michelet, Gould Davis argued that women by the fifteenth century were treated so badly by men of all social classes that they were seen as "worse than beasts". The Church, she said, approved of this domestic violence, and brutality to women extended beyond families to the priesthood, who cited the Bible to justify themselves.

In Gould Davis's view, the status of women was only improved briefly by the Reformation and a flowering of learned women during the sixteenth century. Afterward, Puritanism's witch-hunts and a strengthened papacy placed women back in the same level of submission, and women were tortured and studied in the most prurient manner for "witch marks". Millions of people, she said, most of whom were women, died by burning, drowning, hanging, or from torture during the Catholic and Protestant Inquisitions. In Gould Davis's view, the seventeenth and eighteenth centuries marked the first time Western women accepted their own inferiority, and before Mary Wollstonecraft nobody spoke up for them. Gould Davis made a special effort to show how the minds of women were subjugated during the seventeenth, eighteenth, and nineteenth centuries.

In the last part of The First Sex, Gould Davis attempted to show the beliefs used to subordinate women to be myths, contending that in reality women are stronger, and physically, mentally, and morally more than equal to men; and that the survival of humanity depends on the restoration of women to their former position as rulers of society. Gould Davis argued that patriarchal civilization is destroying itself, and that only the values of the "matriarchates" can save humanity, because a society based on the mechanistic, Cartesian duality of dominant and violent males leads inevitably to a focus on technology and gadgetry rather than on loving human relationships.

=== Advocacy for future matriarchy ===
Gould Davis called for "the matriarchal counterrevolution that is the only hope for the survival of the human race" and opined that "spiritual force", "[m]ental and spiritual gifts", and "[e]xtrasensory perception" will be more important than "physical force", "gifts of a physical nature", and "sensory perception", respectively, so that "woman will again predominate" and that "the next civilization will ... revolve ["about"] ["divine woman"]", as it had in the past that she asserted.

According to critic Ginette Castro, Gould Davis proposed a discourse "rooted in the purest female chauvinism" and seemed to support "a feminist counterattack stigmatizing the patriarchal present", "giv[ing] ... in to a revenge-seeking form of feminism", "build[ing] ... her case on the humiliation of men", and "asserti[ng] ... a specifically feminine nature ... [as] morally superior." Castro criticized the essentialism and the assertion of superiority as "sexist" and "treason".

== Influence and criticism ==
Since its publication, there has been criticism of The First Sex. In Goddess Unmasked, Phillip Davis argued that the assertions by Gould Davis and Marija Gimbutas are severely distorted at best, that serious study of artifacts in Europe and Anatolia does not support the idea of a peaceful matriarchy, and that there is no evidence for a female monotheism of the type advocated by Gould Davis. Similarly, in her 2000 book The Myth of Matriarchal Prehistory, Cynthia Eller attempted to show that, not only is Gould Davis's theory of prehistoric matriarchal queendoms unsupported by archaeological evidence, but even if it were true, it would not give women any more hope for a just and equal future, simply because replicating the ancient past in today's world is not feasible. She did, however, accept the notion that some Neolithic and Bronze-Age societies centered around female deities: "Certainly we are aware of numerous cross-cultural instances of goddess worship accompanied by widespread use of … [female] figurines, so this is one of the most likely explanations of the Neolithic figurine assemblages." Continuing, she wrote, "Especially persuasive is the fact that goddess figurines — and larger-scale goddess images as well — exist in later cultures in the same geographic area" as the prehistoric figurines (p. 139).

In a partially sympathetic review, Ginette Castro wrote, "For this obscure librarian from Florida, myth is historically true" . . . "Elizabeth Gould Davis's historical reconstruction depends a great deal on drawing morals from the tale, and is filled with numerous, glaring extrapolations. However, the argument is so skillfully and ingeniously woven that the woman reader cannot help but be swayed." "Although it is difficult to grant the book any immediate practical value, it must be recognized that it has a cultural interest, that of exposing the sexual substrata of our culture."

Other writers with a feminist orientation have, however, reviewed the book more harshly. Kay L. Cothran, in the Journal of American Folklore, wrote, "the book is an example of folklore misapplied" . . . "The problem of evidence runs throughout the book, which is heavily footnoted and jammed with quotations. The difference between citations and evidence has not impressed itself upon [Gould] Davis. Her notes come from a librarian's search, not a scholar's research. For [Gould] Davis, a reliable source is one that agrees with her; one that disagrees is a part of the conspiracy." "So the kindest thing one can say for [Gould] Davis' folkloristic and general scholarly competence is that it does not exist. It is unfortunate that she buries some sound information under such piles of rubbish."

In a similar vein, Amy Hackett and Sarah Pomeroy, in Feminist Studies, wrote, "Unfortunately, The First Sex is a bad book, as we shall demonstrate. Yet it deserves more than a perfunctory dismissal." "The book's extravagant disorganization makes the job of summarizing nearly impossible." "It typifies [Gould] Davis's method that her 'historical' chapters reflect an inverse relationship between what available sources, documents, statistics, and the like allow us to know about women in a given period and the space she devotes to that period. Some excellent sources do exist for women's history, but [Gould] Davis prefers to rely on the obscure, idiosyncratic, and piquant, ignoring more substantive sources." . . . "until historians reject old-fashioned science and opt for intuition, [Gould] Davis's brand of history will be unacceptable."

According to Castro, the book "undeniably" encouraged women to study their history.

== See also ==
- When God Was a Woman
- The Hebrew Goddess
- Breast fetishism
- History of feminism
- Matriarchies in mythology
- Matriarchal religion
