= Matriarchy =

Social system with female rule

Matriarchy is a social system in which positions of power and privilege are primarily held by women. In a broader sense it can also extend to moral authority, social privilege, and control of property. While those definitions apply in general English, definitions specific to anthropology and feminism differ in some respect.

Matriarchies may also be confused with matrilineal, matrilocal, and matrifocal societies. While some may consider any non-patriarchal system to be matriarchal, most academics exclude those systems from matriarchies as strictly defined. Many societies have had matriarchal elements.

== Definitions ==
The common definition of matriarchy is rule by women who hold a monopoly or near monopoly on power and dominate society. Historian Helen Diner describes matriarchies as "women monopolizing government." She described matriarchal Amazons as "an extreme, feminist wing" (Note: Amazon feminism, feminism that emphasizes female physical prowess toward the goal of gender equality) of humanity and that North African women "ruled the country politically" before being overthrown by forms of patriarchy and, according to Margot Adler, Diner "envision[ed] a dominance matriarchy." Other similar definitions focus on mothers, rather than women, governing and dominating society. Etymologically, the word matriarchy is from Latin māter (genitive mātris), "mother" and Greek ἄρχειν arkhein, "to rule".

According to Heide Göttner-Abendroth, the reluctance to accept the existence of matriarchies is based on a biased understanding of matriarchy informed by living within a patriarchal society. Since in a patriarchy men rule over women, it is assumed that a matriarchy would be women ruling over men. Instead, supporters of an alternative definition argue that matriarchies are societies led by women, especially mothers, who have significant say over political and economic decisions while still being generally egalitarian. According to Adler, in the Marxist tradition, it usually refers to a pre-class society "where women and men share equally in production and power."

Supporters of an egalitarian definition of matriarchy argue that they emphasise life and femininity, using maternal values, practices, rituals and symbols where women play a central role. According to Barbara Love and Elizabeth Shanklin matriarchies are socially inclusive societies where women create the next generation, define motherhood and shape society for rearing children. Women have positions of power in matriarchal societies and they are organised around goddess worship and matriliny. Eller wrote that the idea of matriarchy mainly rests on two pillars, romanticism and modern social criticism.

Many people on both sides of the debate have argued that proposed definitions of matriarchy are too vague to be useful. For example, Göttner-Abendroth argues that, "...these older theories are characterized...by a lack of a clear, scientifically based definition...The result is the illogical, emotionally-charged baggage..." The Modern Matriarchal Studies school, led by Göttner-Abendroth, calls for what she considers a more scientific redefinition of a matriarchal society. She splits her definition into four dimensions. Her definition states that the society is run in accordance with matriliny, matrilocality and matrifocality, often using clans. The political dimension is run by consensus-based decision-making. The economic sphere is a gift economy run primarily by women. Finally, the religious dimension involves a focus on rebirth/reincarnation, with the divine feminine being ultimate. Göttner-Abendroth emphasises that "...gender equality prevails, expressed in the principle of consensus..." and "...that all sexes have equal value and each has its own sphere of activity."

=== Conflated concepts ===
Many people often conflate matriarchy with various terms. These terms describe types of familial organisation or alternative political ideologies. For example, various similar terms such as gynecocracy, gynocracy, gynaecocracy, gyneocracy, and gynarchy, all refer to the rule of women over men. The term Matriology, which is from Latin word māter (mother) and Greek word λογος (logos, teaching about) is used in theology and the history of religion as a designation for the study of the motherly aspects of various female deities and femininity. Matrilineality (often called Matriliny), which is a system where descent, identity, inheritance or property are passed down through female lineages. Matrilocality which is when married couples live close to the wife's family rather than the husband's. Matrifocality, which refers to a household or family being primarily led by women.

Terms such as matristic and matricentric convey similar ideas. The term matricentric means 'having a mother as head of the family or household.' Various scholars such as Marija Gimbutas, Gerda Lerner, and Riane Eisler describe their hypothesis of goddess-worshipping women-centred societies in prehistoric Europe and other ancient civilisations by using the term matristic rather than matriarchal. Marija Gimbutas states that she uses "the term matristic simply to avoid the term matriarchy with the understanding that it incorporates matriliny."

== History and distribution ==
Most anthropologists, who follow the female dominance definition of matriarchy, argue that there are no known societies that are clearly matriarchal. Meaning there are no documented societies that have completely excluded men from roles of authority. Anthropologist Donald Brown's list of human cultural universals (viz., features shared by nearly all current human societies) includes men being the "dominant element" in public political affairs, which he asserts is the contemporary opinion of mainstream anthropology.

A belief that women's rule preceded men's rule was held by many nineteenth-century intellectuals such as Bachofen. The hypothesis has since continued in the context of feminism and especially second-wave feminism.

=== By region ===
==== Americas ====
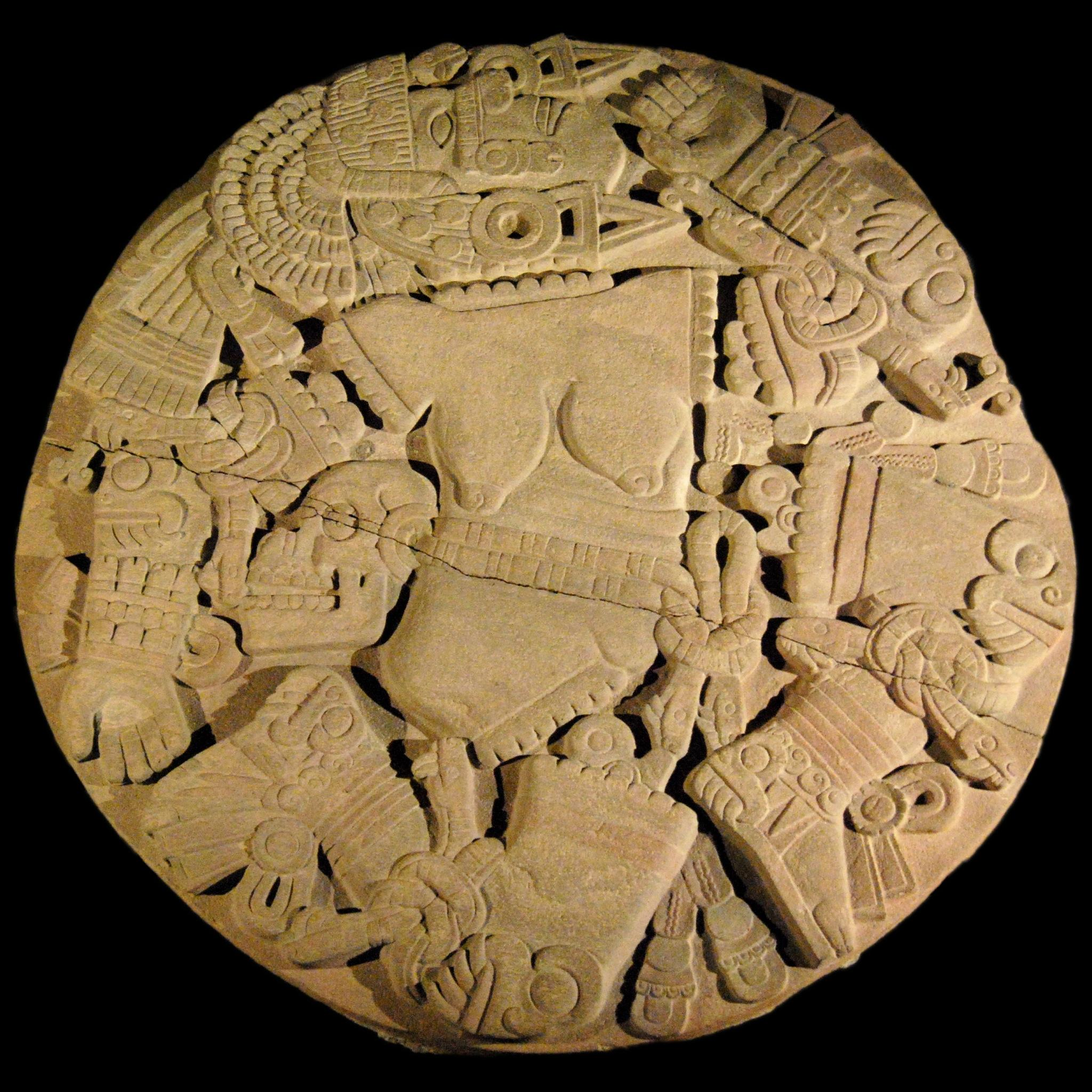
Large stone disk depicting the vanquished Aztec goddess Coyolxāuhqui. The myth surrounding Coyolxāuhqui and her brother Huitzilopochtli has been interpreted by some feminist scholars, such as Cherríe Moraga, as an allegory for a possible real life shift from matriarchy to patriarchy in early Mexica society.

Bamberger (1974) examines several matriarchal myths from South American cultures and concludes that portraying the women from this matriarchal period as immoral often serves to restrain contemporary women in these societies, providing reason for the overthrow by the patriarchy. Spokespersons for various indigenous peoples at the United Nations, have highlighted the central role of women in their societies, referring to them as matriarchies, in danger of being overthrown by the patriarchy, or as matriarchal in character.

==== Old Europe ====
Robert Graves in his book "The Greek Myths" (1955) controversially argued that many of those mythic stories derive from a time when European matriarchy and female-dominated religion was being resisted and eventually overthrown by patriarchal systems and beliefs.

From the 1950s, Marija Gimbutas developed a theory of an Old European culture in Neolithic Europe with matriarchal traits, which had been replaced by the patriarchal system of the Proto-Indo-Europeans in the Bronze Age. However, other anthropologists warned that "the goddess worship or matrilocality that evidently existed in many paleolithic societies was not necessarily associated with matriarchy in the sense of women's power over men. Many societies can be found that exhibit those qualities along with female subordination." According to Eller, Gimbutas had a large part in constructing a myth of historical matriarchy by examining Eastern European cultures that never really resembled the alleged universal matriarchy. She asserts that in "actually documented primitive societies" of recent (historical) times, paternity is never ignored and that the sacred status of goddesses does not automatically increase female social status, and she interprets utopian matriarchy as an invented inversion of antifeminism.

Folklore ranging from the Iron Age to the Middle Ages, several northwestern European mythologies from the Irish (e.g. Macha and Scáthach), the Brittonic (e.g. Rhiannon), and the Germanic (e.g. Grendel's mother and Nerthus) contain ambiguous episodes of primal female power which have been interpreted as folk evidence of remaining matriarchal attitudes in Iron Age European societies. Often transcribed from a retrospective, patriarchal, Romanised, and Catholic perspective, they hint at a possible earlier era when female power predominated. The first-century historical British figure of Boudicca indicates that Brittonnic society permitted explicit female autocracy or a form of gender equality which contrasted strongly with the patriarchal Mediterranean civilisation that later overthrew it.

Robert Graves suggested that many myths displaced earlier myths that had to change when a major cultural change brought patriarchy to replace a matriarchy. According to this myth, in Greek mythology, Zeus is said to have swallowed his pregnant lover, the titan goddess Metis, who was carrying their daughter, Athena. The mother and child created havoc inside Zeus. Either Hermes or Hephaestus split Zeus's head, allowing Athena, in full battle armor, to burst forth from his forehead. Athena was thus described as being "born" from Zeus. The outcome pleased Zeus as it didn't fulfill the prophecy of Themis which (according to Aeschylus) predicted that Zeus will one day bear a son that would overthrow him.

==== India ====
In India, of communities recognized in the national Constitution as Scheduled Tribes, "some ... [are] matriarchal and matrilineal" "and thus have been known to be more egalitarian". According to interviewer Anuj Kumar, Manipur, India, "has a matriarchal society", but this may not be scholarly. In Kerala, Nairs, Thiyyas, Brahmins of Payyannoor village and Muslims of North Malabar and in Karnataka, Bunts and Billavas follow the matrilineal system.

=== By culture ===
==== Amazons ====
A legendary matriarchy related by several writers was Amazon society. According to Phyllis Chesler, "in Amazon societies, women were ... mothers and their society's only political and religious leaders", as well as the only warriors and hunters; "queens were elected" and apparently "any woman could aspire to and achieve full human expression." Herodotus reported that the Sarmatians were descendants of Amazons and Scythians, and that their women observed their ancient maternal customs, "frequently hunting on horseback with their husbands; in war taking the field; and wearing the very same dress as the men". Moreover, said Herodotus, "no girl shall wed till she has killed a man in battle". Amazons came to play a role in Roman historiography. Julius Caesar spoke of the conquest of large parts of Asia by Semiramis and the Amazons. Although Strabo was sceptical about their historicity, the Amazons were taken as historical throughout late Antiquity. Several Church Fathers spoke of the Amazons as a real people. Medieval authors continued a tradition of locating the Amazons in the North, Adam of Bremen placing them at the Baltic Sea and Paulus Diaconus in the heart of Germania.

==== Basque ====
The hypothesis of Basque matriarchism or theory of Basque matriarchism is a theoretical proposal launched by Andrés Ortiz-Osés that maintains that the existence of a psychosocial structure centered or focused on the matriarchal-feminine archetype (mother / woman, which finds in the archetype of the great Basque mother Mari, her precipitate as a projection of Mother Earth / nature) that "permeates, coagulates and unites the traditional Basque social group in a way that is different from the patriarchal Indo-European peoples".

This mythical matriarchal conception corresponds to the conception of the Basques, clearly reflected in their mythology. The Earth is the mother of the Sun and the Moon, compared to Indo-European patriarchal conceptions, where the sun is reflected as a God, numen or male spirit. Prayers and greetings were dedicated to these two sisters at dawn and dusk, when they returned to the bosom of Mother Earth.

Franz-Karl Mayr, this philosopher argued that the archetypal background of Basque mythology had to be inscribed in the context of a Paleolithic dominated by the Great Mother, in which the cycle of Mari (goddess) and her metamorphoses offers all a typical symbolism of the matriarchal-naturalistic context. According to the archetype of the Great Mother, this is usually related to fertility cults, as in the case of Mari, who is the determinant of fertility-fecundity, the maker of rain or hail, that on whose telluric forces depend the crops, in space and time, life and death, luck (grace) and misfortune.

==== Celts ====
According to Adler, "there is plenty of evidence of ancient societies where women held greater power than in many societies today. For example, Jean Markale's studies of Celtic societies show that the power of women was reflected not only in myth and legend but in legal codes pertaining to marriage, divorce, property ownership, and the right to rule...although this was overthrown by the patriarchy."

==== Elamite ====
The Cambridge Ancient History (1975) stated that "the predominance of a supreme goddess is probably a reflection from the practice of matriarchy which at all times characterized Elamite civilization to a greater or lesser degree, before this practice was overthrown by the patriarchy". (Note: Elamite civilization, an ancient civilization in part of what is now Iran)

==== Estonian ====
Anne Helene Gjelstad describes the women on the Estonian islands Kihnu and Manija as "the last matriarchal society in Europe" because "the older women here take care of almost everything on land as their husbands travel the seas".

==== Haudenosaunee ====
The Haudenosaunee Confederacy, composed of six nations, before the U.S. became a state, operates by The Great Binding Law of Peace, a constitution by which women participate in the League's political decision-making, including deciding whether to proceed to war, through what may be a matriarchy or gyneocracy. According to Doug George-Kanentiio, in this society, mothers exercise central moral and political roles. The dates of this constitution's operation are unknown; the League was formed in approximately 1000–1450, but the constitution was oral until written in about 1880.

George-Kanentiio explains:

In our society, women are the center of all things. Nature, we believe, has given women the ability to create; therefore it is only natural that women be in positions of power to protect this function....We traced our clans through women; a child born into the world assumed the clan membership of its mother. Our young women were expected to be physically strong....The young women received formal instruction in traditional planting....Since the Iroquois were absolutely dependent upon the crops they grew, whoever controlled this vital activity wielded great power within our communities. It was our belief that since women were the givers of life they naturally regulated the feeding of our people....In all countries, real wealth stems from the control of land and its resources. Our Iroquois philosophers knew this as well as we knew natural law. To us it made sense for women to control the land since they were far more sensitive to the rhythms of the Mother Earth. We did not own the land but were custodians of it. Our women decided any and all issues involving territory, including where a community was to be built and how land was to be used....In our political system, we mandated full equality. Our leaders were selected by a caucus of women before the appointments were subject to popular review....Our traditional governments are composed of an equal number of men and women. The men are chiefs and the women clan-mothers....As leaders, the women closely monitor the actions of the men and retain the right to veto any law they deem inappropriate....Our women not only hold the reins of political and economic power, they also have the right to determine all issues involving the taking of human life. Declarations of war had to be approved by the women, while treaties of peace were subject to their deliberations.

==== Hopi ====
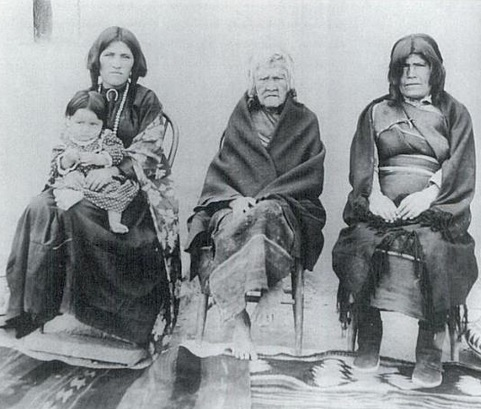
Nampeyo, of the Hopi-Tewa People, in 1901; with her mother, White Corn; her eldest daughter, Annie Healing holding her granddaughter, Rachel

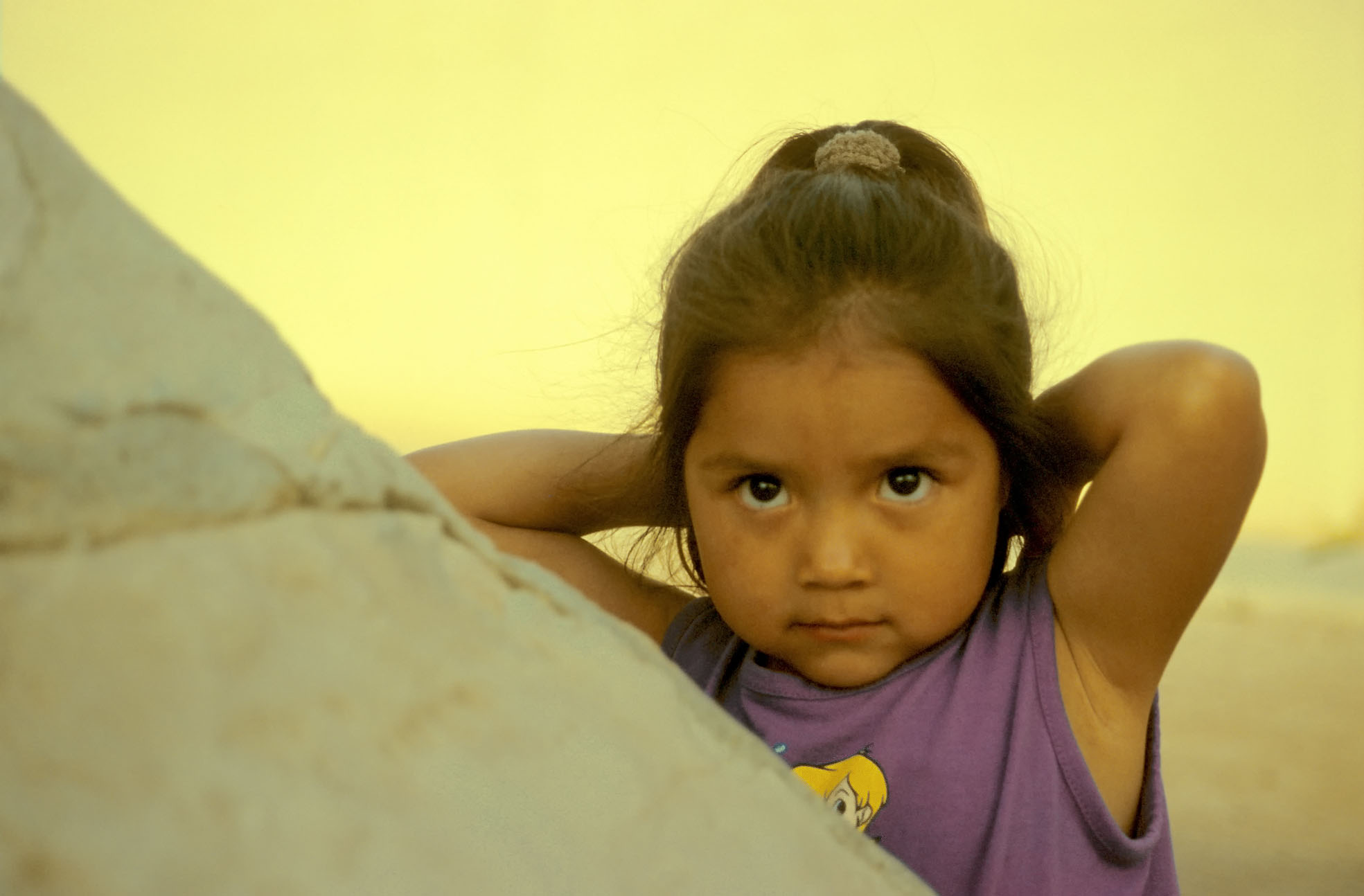
Girl in the Hopi Reservation

The Hopi (in what is now the Hopi Reservation in northeastern Arizona), according to Alice Schlegel, had as its "gender ideology ... one of female superiority, and it operated within a social actuality of sexual equality." According to LeBow (based on Schlegel's work), in the Hopi, "gender roles ... are egalitarian .... [and] [n]either sex is inferior." (Note: Gender role, set of norms for a gender in social relationships) LeBow concluded that Hopi women "participate fully in ... political decision-making." (Note: Clan Mothers, elder matriarchs of certain Native American clans, who were typically in charge of appointing tribal chiefs) According to Schlegel, "the Hopi no longer live as they are described here" and "the attitude of female superiority is fading". Schlegel said the Hopi "were and still are matrilineal" and "the household ... was matrilocal". Schlegel explains why there was female superiority as that the Hopi believed in "life as the highest good ... [with] the female principle ... activated in women and in Mother Earth ... as its source" and that the Hopi had no need for an army as they did not have rivalries with neighbors. Women were central to institutions of clan and household and predominated "within the economic and social systems (in contrast to male predominance within the political and ceremonial systems)." The Clan Mother, for example, was empowered to overturn land distribution by men if she felt it was unfair since there was no "countervailing ... strongly centralized, male-centered political structure".

==== Karenni ====
Possible matriarchies in Burma are, according to Jørgen Bitsch, the Padaungs and, according to Andrew Marshall, the Kayaw.

==== Khasi and Garo ====
The Khasi and Garo peoples residing in the North East regions of India are two of the most known matriarchal societies of Meghalaya. The Khasi people live in Northeast India in the state of Meghalaya. Although largely considered matrilineal, some women's studies scholars such as Roopleena Banerjee consider the Khasi to be matriarchal. Banerjee asserts that "to assess and account a matriarchal society through the parameters of the patriarchy would be wrong" and that "we should avoid looking at history only through the colonizer/colonized boundaries." The Khasi people consist of many clans who trace their lineage through the matriarchs of the families. A Khasi husband typically moves into his wife's home, and both wife and husband participate equally in raising their children. A Khasi woman named Passah explains that "[The father] would come to his wife's home late at night... In the morning, he's back at his mother's home to work in the fields," showing how a man's role consists of supporting his wife and family in Khasi society. Traditionally, the youngest daughter, called the Khadduh, receives and cares for ancestral property. As of 2021, the Khasi continue to practice many female-led customs, with wealth and property being passed down through the female side of the family.

==== Minangkabau ====
Anthropologist Peggy Reeves Sanday has said that the Minangkabau society is a matriarchy.

==== Minoan ====
According to Rohrlich, "many scholars are convinced that Crete was a matriarchy, ruled by a queen-priestess" and the "Cretan civilization" was "matriarchal" before "1500 BC," when it was overrun and colonized by the patriarchy. Archaeologist Marianna Nikolaidou investigated the question of matriarchy in Neolithic Greece and Bronze Age Crete concluding, "Aside from the limited genetic data about family and kinship, which themselves are open to interpretation, the excavated evidence neither supports or precludes the existence of such a social system." Feminist thealogian Samantha Catalina Sinclair likewise criticizes the identification of Crete as a matriarchy saying, "...the Women’s Spirituality tradition brought... religious knowing to an archaeological question[.] Although the tradition correctly recognized the unusual prominence of female [imagery] at Knossos, it asked those archaeological observations to bear historical conclusions..."

==== Mosuo ====
The Mosuo, who live in China near Tibet, are frequently described as matriarchal. The term matrilineal is sometimes used, and, while more accurate, does not reflect the full complexity of their social organization; in fact, it is difficult to categorize Mosuo culture within traditional Western definitions. They have aspects of a matriarchal culture: women are often the head of the house, inheritance is through the female line, and women make business decisions. On the other hand, political decisions tend to be made by men. It is also worthy of note that current culture of the Mosuo has been heavily shaped by their status as a minority in China. They are considered one of the most well-known matriarchal societies, although many scholars assert that they are rather matrilineal. As of 2016, the sole heirs in the family are still daughters. Since 1990, when foreign tourism became permitted, tourists started visiting the Mosuo people. As pointed out by the Xinhua News Agency, "tourism has become so profitable that many Mosuo families in the area who have opened their homes have become wealthy." Although this revived their economy and lifted many out of poverty, it also altered the fabric of their society to have outsiders present who often look down on the Mosuo's cultural practices.

==== Ancient Semitic-speaking peoples ====
One common misconception among historians of the Bronze Age such as Stone and Eisler is the notion that the Semites were matriarchal. An example of this view is found in Stone's When God Was a Woman, wherein she makes the case that the worship of Yahweh was an Indo-European invention superimposed on an ancient matriarchal Semitic nation. Evidence from the Amorites and pre-Islamic Arabs, however, indicates that the primitive Semitic family was in fact patriarchal and patrilineal.

However, not all scholars agree. Anthropologist and Biblical scholar Raphael Patai writes in The Hebrew Goddess that the Jewish religion, far from being pure monotheism, contained from earliest times strong polytheistic elements, chief of which was the cult of Asherah, the mother goddess. A story in the Biblical Book of Judges places the worship of Asherah in the 12th century BC. Originally a Canaanite goddess, her worship was adopted by Hebrews who intermarried with Canaanites. She was worshipped in public and was represented by carved wooden poles. Numerous small nude female figurines of clay were found all over ancient Palestine and a seventh-century Hebrew text invokes her aid for a woman giving birth.

Shekinah is the name of the feminine holy spirit who embodies both divine radiance and compassion. Exemplifying various traits associated with mothers, she comforts the sick and dejected, accompanies the Jews whenever they are exiled, and intercedes with God to exercise mercy rather than to inflict retribution on sinners. While not a creation of the Hebrew Bible, Shekinah appears in a slightly later Aramaic translation of the Bible in the first or second century C.E., according to Patai. Initially portrayed as the presence of God, she later becomes distinct from God, taking on more physical attributes.

==== Sitones ====
Tacitus claimed in his book Germania that in "the nations of the Sitones woman is the ruling sex."

==== Sparta ====
Women ruled Sparta while the men were often away fighting, or when both kings were incapacitated or too young to rule. Gorgo, Queen of Sparta, was asked by a woman in Attica "You Spartan women are the only women that lord it over your men", to which Gorgo replied: "Yes, for we are the only women that are mothers of men!"

==== Sumerian ====
Also according to Rohrlich, "in the early Sumerian city-states 'matriarchy seems to have left something more than a trace.'"

==== Umoja ====
In 1995, in Kenya, according to Emily Wax, Umoja, a village only for women from one tribe with about 36 residents, was established under a matriarch. It was founded on an empty piece of land by women who fled their homes after being raped by British soldiers. They formed a safe-haven in rural Samburu County in northern Kenya. Men of the same tribe established a village nearby from which to observe the women's village, the men's leader objecting to the matriarch's questioning the culture and men suing to close the women's village. As of 2019, 48 women, most of whom have fled gender-based violence like female genital mutilation, assault, rape, and abusive marriages call Umoja home, living with their children in this all-female village. Many of these women faced stigma in their communities following these attacks and had no choice but to flee. Others sought to escape from the nearby Samburu community, which practices child marriage and female genital mutilation. In the village, the women practice "collective economic cooperation." The sons are obligated to move out when they turn eighteen. Not only has the Umoja village protected its members, the members have also done extensive work for gender equity in Kenya. The message of the village has spread outside of Kenya as member "Lolosoli's passion for gender equity in Kenya has carried her to speak on social justice at the United Nations and to participate in an international women's rights conference in South Africa."

==== Vietnam ====
According to William S. Turley, "the role of women in traditional Vietnamese culture was determined [partly] by ... indigenous customs bearing traces of matriarchy", affecting "different social classes" to "varying degrees". Peter C. Phan explains that "the ancient Vietnamese family system was most likely matriarchal, with women ruling over the clan or tribe" until the Vietnamese "adopt[ed] ... the patriarchal system introduced by the Chinese." That being said, even after adopting the patriarchal Chinese system, Vietnamese women, especially peasant women, still held a higher position than women in most patriarchal societies. According to Chiricosta, the legend of Âu Cơ is said to be evidence of "the presence of an original 'matriarchy' in North Vietnam and [it] led to the double kinship system, which developed there .... [and which] combined matrilineal and patrilineal patterns of family structure and assigned equal importance to both lines." (Note: North Vietnam, sovereign state until merged with South Vietnam in 1976) (Note: Patrilineal, belonging to the father's lineage, generally for inheritance) Chiricosta said that other scholars relied on "this 'matriarchal' aspect of the myth to differentiate Vietnamese society from the pervasive spread of Chinese Confucian patriarchy," (Note: Confucianism, ethics and philosophy derived from Confucius) and that "resistance to China's colonization of Vietnam ... [combined with] the view that Vietnam was originally a matriarchy ... [led to viewing] women's struggles for liberation from (Chinese) patriarchy as a metaphor for the entire nation's struggle for Vietnamese independence," and therefore, a "metaphor for the struggle of the matriarchy to resist being overthrown by the patriarchy." According to Keith Weller Taylor, "the matriarchal flavor of the time is ... attested by the fact that Trung Trac's mother's tomb and spirit temple have survived, although nothing remains of her father", and the "society of the Trung sisters" was "strongly matrilineal". According to Donald M. Seekins, an indication of "the strength of matriarchal values" was that a woman, Trưng Trắc, with her younger sister Trưng Nhị, raised an army of "over 80,000 soldiers ... [in which] many of her officers were women", with which they defeated the Chinese. According to Seekins, "in [the year] 40, Trung Trac was proclaimed queen, and a capital was built for her" and modern Vietnam considers the Trung sisters to be heroines. According to Karen G. Turner, in the third century A.D., Lady Triệu "seem[ed] ... to personify the matriarchal culture that mitigated Confucianized patriarchal norms .... [although] she is also painted as something of a freak ... with her ... savage, violent streak."

=== By chronology ===
==== Paleolithic and Neolithic Ages ====
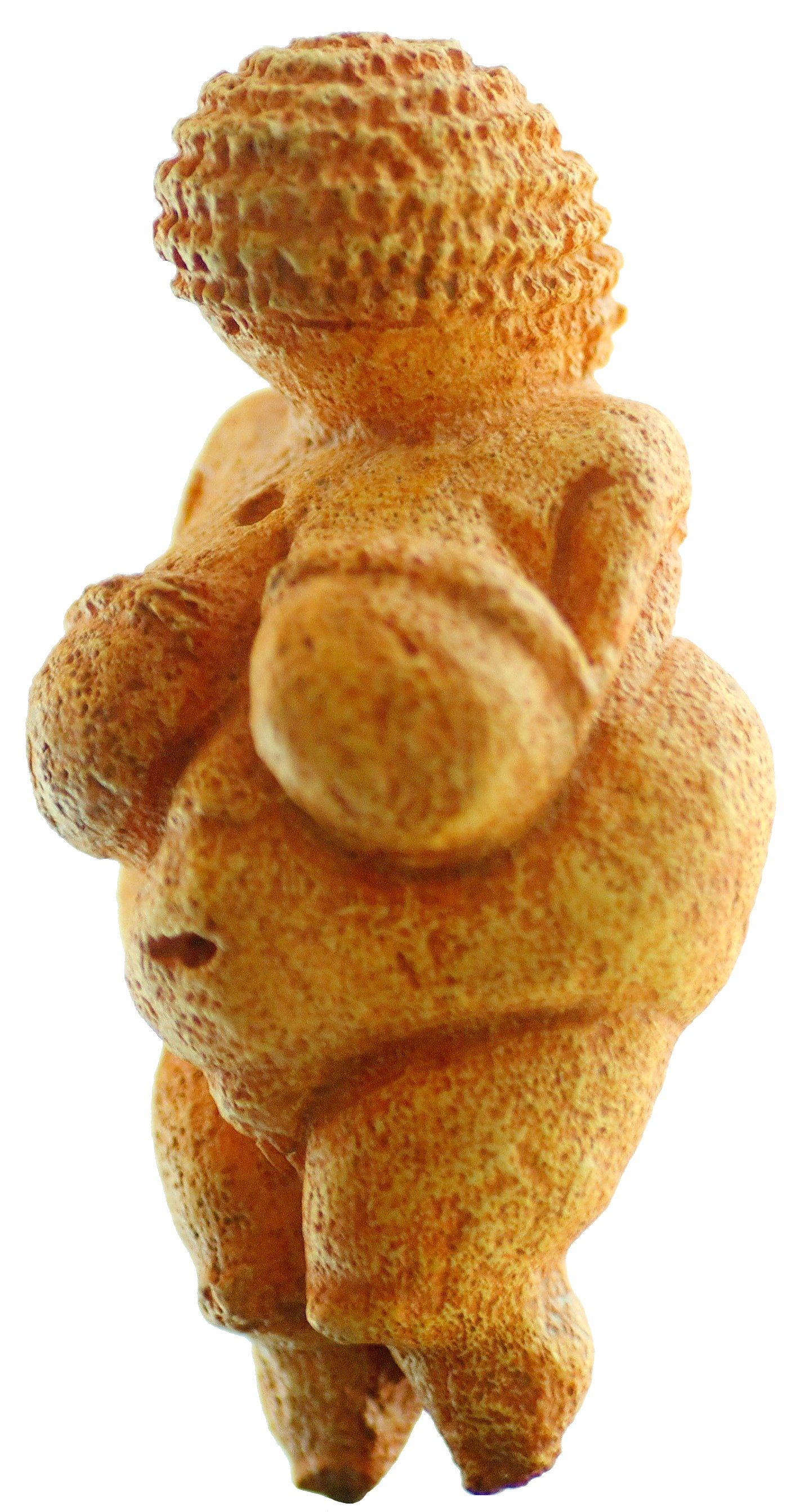
Venus von Willendorf, a Venus figurine

The controversy surrounding prehistoric or "primal" matriarchy began in reaction to the 1861 book by Bachofen, Mother Right: An Investigation of the Religious and Juridical Character of Matriarchy in the Ancient World. Several generations of ethnologists were inspired by his pseudo-evolutionary theory of archaic matriarchy. Following him and Jane Ellen Harrison, several generations of scholars, usually arguing from known myths or oral traditions and examination of Neolithic female cult-figures, suggested that many ancient societies might have been matriarchal, or even that there existed a wide-ranging matriarchal society prior to the ancient cultures of which we are aware. After Bachofen's three-volume Myth, Religion, and Mother Right, classicists such as Harrison, Arthur Evans, Walter Burkert, and James Mellaart looked at the evidence of matriarchal religion in pre-Hellenic societies. The concept was further investigated by Lewis Morgan. According to Uwe Wesel, Bachofen's myth interpretations have proved to be untenable. According to historian Susan Mann, as of 2000, "few scholars these days find ... [a "notion of a stage of primal matriarchy"] persuasive."

Kurt Derungs is a recent non-academic author advocating an "anthropology of landscape" based on allegedly matriarchal traces in toponymy and folklore.

Friedrich Engels, in 1884, claimed that, in the earliest stages of human social development, there was group marriage and that therefore paternity was disputable, whereas maternity was not, so that a family could be traced only through the female line. This was a materialist interpretation of Bachofen's Mutterrecht. Engels speculated that the domestication of animals increased material wealth, which was claimed by men. Engels said that men wanted to control women to use as laborers and to pass on wealth to their children, requiring monogamy; as patriarchy rose, women's status declined until they became mere objects in the exchange trade between men, causing the global defeat of the female sex and the rise of individualism and competition. According to Eller, Engels may have been influenced with respect to women's status by August Bebel, according to whom matriarchy naturally resulted in communism, while patriarchy was characterized by exploitation.

Austrian writer Bertha Diener (or Helen Diner), wrote Mothers and Amazons (1930), the first work to focus on women's cultural history, a classic of feminist matriarchal study. Her view is that all past human societies were originally matriarchal, while most later shifted to patriarchy and degenerated. The controversy intensified with The White Goddess by Robert Graves (1948) and his later analysis of classical Greek mythology, focusing on the reconstruction of earlier myths that had conjecturally been rewritten after a transition from matriarchal to patriarchal religion in very early historical times.

From the 1970s, ideas of matriarchy were taken up by popular writers of second-wave feminism such as Riane Eisler, Elizabeth Gould Davis, and Merlin Stone, and expanded with the speculations of Margaret Murray on witchcraft, by the Goddess movement, and in feminist Wicca. "A Golden Age of matriarchy" was prominently presented by Charlene Spretnak and "encouraged" by Stone and Eisler, but, at least for the Neolithic Age, it has been denounced as feminist wishful thinking in works such as The Inevitability of Patriarchy, Why Men Rule, Goddess Unmasked, and The Myth of Matriarchal Prehistory. The idea is not emphasized in third-wave feminism.

J.F. del Giorgio insists that Paleolithic societies were matrifocal, matrilocal, and matrilineal.

== In feminist thought ==
While matriarchy has mostly fallen out of use for the anthropological description of existing societies, it remains current as a concept in feminism.

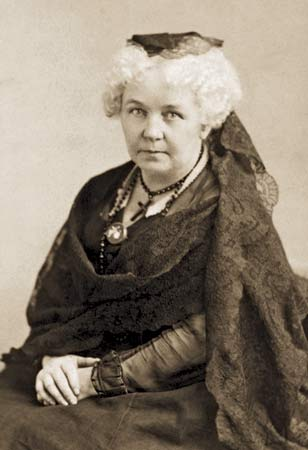
Elizabeth Stanton

In first-wave feminist discourse, either Elizabeth Cady Stanton or Margaret Fuller (it is unclear who was first) introduced the concept of matriarchy and the discourse was joined in by Matilda Joslyn Gage. Victoria Woodhull, in 1871, called for men to open the U.S. government to women or a new constitution and government would be formed in a year; and, on a basis of equality, she ran to be elected president in 1872. Charlotte Perkins Gilman, in 1911 and 1914, argued for "a woman-centered, or better mother-centered, world" and described "government by women". She argued that a government led by either sex must be assisted by the other, both genders being "useful ... and should in our governments be alike used", because men and women have different qualities.

Cultural feminism includes "matriarchal worship", according to Prof. James Penner.

In feminist literature, matriarchy and patriarchy are not conceived as simple mirrors of each other. While matriarchy sometimes means "the political rule of women", that meaning is often rejected, on the ground that matriarchy is not a mirroring of patriarchy. Patriarchy is held to be about power over others while matriarchy is held to be about power from within, Starhawk having written on that distinction and Adler having argued that matriarchal power is not possessive and not controlling, but is harmonious with nature, arguing that women are uniquely capable of using power without exploitative purposes. (Note: Adler wrote a matriarchy is "a realm where female things are valued and where power is exerted in non-possessive, non-controlling, and organic ways that are harmonious with nature.")

For radical feminists, the importance of matriarchy is that "veneration for the female principle ... somewhat lightens an oppressive system."

Feminist utopias are a form of advocacy. According to Tineke Willemsen, "a feminist utopia would ... be the description of a place where at least women would like to live." Willemsen continues, among "type[s] of feminist utopias[,] ... [one] stem[s] from feminists who emphasize the differences between women and men. They tend to formulate their ideal world in terms of a society where women's positions are better than men's. There are various forms of matriarchy, or even a utopia that resembles the Greek myth of the Amazons.... [V]ery few modern utopias have been developed in which women are absolute autocrats."

A minority of feminists, generally radical, have argued that women should govern societies of women and men. In all of these advocacies, the governing women are not limited to mothers:

- In her book Scapegoat: The Jews, Israel, and Women's Liberation, Andrea Dworkin stated that she wanted women to have their own country, "Womenland," which, comparable to Israel, would serve as a "place of potential refuge". In the Palestine Solidarity Review, Veronica A. Ouma reviewed the book and argued her view that while Dworkin "pays lip service to the egalitarian nature of ... [stateless] societies [without hierarchies], she envisions a state whereby women either impose gender equality or a state where women rule supreme above men."
- Starhawk, in The Fifth Sacred Thing (1993), fiction, wrote of "a utopia where women are leading societies but are doing so with the consent of men."
- Phyllis Chesler wrote in Women and Madness (2005 and 1972) that feminist women must "dominate public and social institutions". She also wrote that women fare better when controlling the means of production and that equality with men should not be supported, even if female domination is no more "just" than male domination. On the other hand, in 1985, she was "probably more of a feminist-anarchist ... more mistrustful of the organisation of power into large bureaucratic states [than she was in 1972]". (Note: Anarcha-feminism, a philosophy combining anarchism and feminism) Between Chesler's 1972 and 2005 editions, Dale Spender wrote that Chesler "takes [as] a ... stand [that] .... [e]quality is a spurious goal, and of no use to women: the only way women can protect themselves is if they dominate particular institutions and can use them to serve women's interests. Reproduction is a case in point." Spender wrote Chesler "remarks ... women will be superior".
- Monique Wittig authored, as fiction (not as fact), Les Guérillères, with her description of an asserted "female State". The work was described by Rohrlich as a "fictional counterpart" to "so-called Amazon societies". Scholarly interpretations of the fictional work include that women win a war against men, "reconcil[e]" with "those men of good will who come to join them", exercise feminist autonomy through polyandry, decide how to govern, and rule the men. The women confronting men are, according to Tucker Farley, diverse and thus stronger and more united and, continued Farley, permit a "few ... men, who are willing to accept a feminist society of primitive communism, ... to live." Another interpretation is that the author created an "'open structure' of freedom".
- Mary Daly wrote of hag-ocracy, "the place we ["women traveling into feminist time/space"] govern", (Note: For another definition of hag by Mary Daly, see Daly, Mary, with Jane Caputi, Websters' First New Intergalactic Wickedary of the English Language (London, Great Britain: Women's Press, 1988 (ISBN 0-7043-4114-X)), p. 137.) and of reversing phallocratic rule in the 1990s (i.e., when published). She considered equal rights as tokenism that works against sisterhood, even as she supported abortion being legal and other reforms. She considered her book pro-female and anti-male.
- Rasa von Werder has also long advocated for a return to matriarchy, a restoration of its status before its overthrow by patriarchy, along with associated author William Bond as well.

Some such advocacies are informed by work on the matriarchies of the past:

- According to Prof. Linda Zerilli, "an ancient matriarchy ... [was "in early second-wave feminism"] the lost object of women's freedom." Prof. Cynthia Eller found widespread acceptance of matriarchal myth during feminism's second wave. According to Kathryn Rountree, the belief in a prepatriarchal "Golden Age" of matriarchy may have been more specifically about a matrifocal society, although this was believed more in the 1970s than in the 1990s–2000s and was criticized within feminism and within archaeology, anthropology, and theological study as lacking a scholarly basis, and Prof. Harvey C. Mansfield wrote that "the evidence [is] ... of males ruling over all societies at almost all times". Eller said that, other than a few separatist radical lesbian feminists, spiritual feminists would generously include "a place for men ... in which they can be happy and productive, if not necessarily powerful and in control" and might have social power as well.
- Jill Johnston envisioned a "return to the former glory and wise equanimity of the matriarchies" in the future and "imagined lesbians as constituting an imaginary radical state, and invoked 'the return to the harmony of statehood and biology....'" Her work inspired efforts at implementation by the Lesbian Organization of Toronto (LOOT) in 1976–1980 and in Los Angeles.
- Elizabeth Gould Davis believed that a "matriarchal counterrevolution [replacing "a[n old] patriarchal revolution"] ... is the only hope for the survival of the human race." She believed that "spiritual force", "mental and spiritual gifts", and "extrasensory perception" (Note: Extrasensory perception (ESP), perception sensed by the mind but not originating through recognized physical senses) will be more important and therefore that "woman will ... predominate", and that it is "about ... ["woman" that] the next civilization will ... revolve", as in the kind of past that she believed existed. According to critic Prof. Ginette Castro, Elizabeth Gould Davis used the words matriarchy and gynocracy "interchangeably" and proposed a discourse "rooted in the purest female chauvinism" (Note: Chauvinism, partisanship that is extreme and unreasoning and in favor of a group) and seemed to support "a feminist counterattack stigmatizing the patriarchal present", "giv[ing] ... in to a revenge-seeking form of feminism", "build[ing] ... her case on the humiliation of men", and "asserti[ng] ... a specifically feminine nature ... [as] morally superior." Castro criticized Elizabeth Gould Davis' essentialism and assertion of superiority as "sexist" and "treason".
- One organization that was named The Feminists was interested in matriarchy and was one of the largest of the radical feminist women's liberation groups of the 1960s. Two members wanted "the restoration of female rule", but the organization's founder, Ti-Grace Atkinson, would have objected had she remained in the organization, because, according to a historian, "[she] had always doubted that women would wield power differently from men."

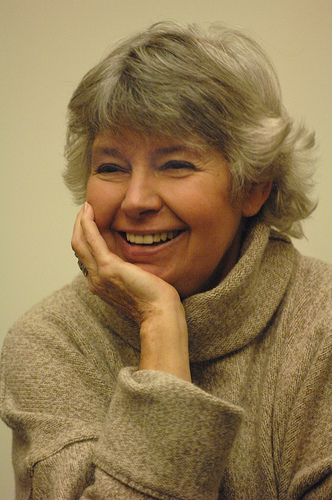
Robin Morgan

- Robin Morgan wrote of women fighting for and creating a "gynocratic world".
- Adler reported, "if feminists have diverse views on the matriarchies of the past, they also are of several minds on the goals for the future. A woman in the coven of Ursa Maior told me, 'right now I am pushing for women's power in any way I can, but I don't know whether my ultimate aim is a society where all human beings are equal, regardless of the bodies they were born into, or whether I would rather see a society where women had institutional authority.'"

Some fiction caricatured the current gender hierarchy by describing an inverted matriarchal alternative without necessarily advocating for it. According to Karin Schönpflug, "Gerd Brantenberg's Egalia's Daughters is a caricature of powered gender relations which have been completely reversed, with the female sex on the top and the male sex a degraded, oppressed group"; "gender inequality is expressed through power inversion" and "all gender roles are reversed and women rule over a class of intimidated, effeminate men" compelled into that submissive gender role. "Egalia is not a typical example of gender inequality in the sense that a vision of a desirable matriarchy is created; Egalia is more a caricature of male hegemony by twisting gender hierarchy but not really offering a 'better world.'"

On egalitarian matriarchy, Heide Göttner-Abendroth's International Academy for Modern Matriarchal Studies and Matriarchal Spirituality (HAGIA) organized conferences in Luxembourg in 2003 and Texas in 2005, with papers published. Göttner-Abendroth argued that "matriarchies are all egalitarian at least in terms of gender—they have no gender hierarchy .... [, that, f]or many matriarchal societies, the social order is completely egalitarian at both local and regional levels", that, "for our own path toward new egalitarian societies, we can gain ... insight from ... ["tested"] matriarchal patterns", and that "matriarchies are not abstract utopias, constructed according to philosophical concepts that could never be implemented."

According to Eller, "a deep distrust of men's ability to adhere to" future matriarchal requirements may invoke a need "to retain at least some degree of female hegemony to insure against a return to patriarchal control", "feminists ... [having] the understanding that female dominance is better for society—and better for men—than the present world order", as is equalitarianism. On the other hand, Eller continued, if men can be trusted to accept equality, probably most feminists seeking future matriarchy would accept an equalitarian model.

"Demographic[ally]", "feminist matriarchalists run the gamut" but primarily are "in white, well-educated, middle-class circles"; many of the adherents are "religiously inclined" while others are "quite secular".

Biology as a ground for holding either males or females superior over the other has been criticized as invalid, such as by Andrea Dworkin and by Robin Morgan. A claim that women have unique characteristics that prevent women's assimilation with men has been apparently rejected by Ti-Grace Atkinson. On the other hand, not all advocates based their arguments on biology or essentialism.

A criticism by Mansfield of choosing who governs according to gender or sex is that the best qualified people should be chosen, regardless of gender or sex. On the other hand, Mansfield considered merit insufficient for office, because a legal right granted by a sovereign (e.g., a king), was more important than merit.

Diversity within a proposed community can, according to Becki L. Ross, make it especially challenging to complete forming the community. However, some advocacy includes diversity, in the views of Dworkin and Farley.

Prof. Christine Stansell, a feminist, wrote that, for feminists to achieve state power, women must democratically cooperate with men. "Women must take their place with a new generation of brothers in a struggle for the world's fortunes. Herland, whether of virtuous matrons or daring sisters, is not an option... [T]he well-being and liberty of women cannot be separated from democracy's survival." (Herland was feminist utopian fiction by Charlotte Perkins Gilman in 1911, featuring a community entirely of women except for three men who seek it out, strong women in a matriarchal utopia expected to last for generations, demonstrated a marked era of peace and personal satisfaction, although Charlotte Perkins Gilman was herself a feminist advocate of society being gender-integrated and of women's freedom.)

Other criticisms of matriarchy are that it could result in reverse sexism or discrimination against men, that it is opposed by most people including most feminists, or that many women do not want leadership positions, (Note: "Women do not run for office as readily as men do, nor do most women, it seems, call on them to run. It seems that they do not have the same desire to 'run' things as men, to use the word in another political sense that like the first includes standing out in front.... Women are partisan, like men; hence they are political, like men. But not to the same degree. They will readily sail into partisan conflict, but they are not so ready to take the lead and make themselves targets of partisan hostility (though they do write provocative books)." [A] "study .... traces the gender gap ... to 'participatory factors,' such as education and income, that give men greater advantages in civic skills, enabling them to participate politically" "[I]n politics and in other public situations, he ["the manly man"] willingly takes responsibility when others hang back.... His wife and children ... are weaker", "manliness ... is aggression that develops an assertion, a cause it espouses"... "a woman .... may have less ambition or a different ambition, but being a political animal like a man, she too likes to rule, if in her way". See also Schaub (2006).) governing takes women away from family responsibilities, women are too likely to be unable to serve politically because of menstruation and pregnancy, public affairs are too sordid for women and would cost women their respect and femininity (apparently including fertility), superiority is not traditional, (Note: "Athenians were extreme, but almost no Greeks or Romans thought women should participate in government. There was no approved public forum for any kind of women's self-expression, not even in the arts and religion [perhaps except "priestesses"].") women lack the political capacity and authority men have, (Note: "[according to] Aristotle ....[,] [a]s women do not have the authority, the political capacity, of men, they are, as it were, elbowed out of politics and ushered into the household.... Meanwhile, the male rules because of his greater authority".) it is impractical because of a shortage of women with the ability to govern at that level of difficulty as well as the desire and ability to wage war, (Note: "ability to fight .... is an important claim to rule ..., and it is the culmination of the aggressive manly stereotype we are considering", "who can reasonably deny that women are not as accomplished as men in battle either in spirit or in physique? .... Conservatives say that this proves that women are not the same as men", & "manliness is best shown in war, the defense of one's country at its most difficult and dangerous" "there might come a point when ... stronger persons would have to be fought [by women] rather than merely told off.... The very great majority of women would take a pass on the opportunity to be GI Jane. In the NATO countries where women are allowed in combat units they form only 1 percent of the complement.... Whatever their belief about equality, women might reasonably decide they are needed more elsewhere than in combat") (Note: GI Jane is 'a female member of a military'.) (Note: NATO, North Atlantic Treaty Organization, which provides collective military defense for member nations) women are less aggressive, or less often so, than are men and politics is aggressive, women legislating would not serve men's interests or would serve only petty interests, it is contradicted by current science on genderal differences, it is unnatural, (Note: "Mrs. Woodhull offers herself in apparent good faith as a candidate, and perhaps she has a remote impression, or rather hope, that she may be elected, but it seems that she is rather in advance of her time. The public mind is not yet educated to the pitch of universal woman's rights" ... "At present man, in his affection for and kindness toward the weaker sex, is disposed to accord her any reasonable number of privileges. Beyond that stage he pauses, because there seems to him to be something which is unnatural in permitting her to share the turmoil, the excitement, the risks of competition for the glory of governing.") and, in the views of a playwright and a novelist, "women cannot govern on their own." On the other hand, another view is that "women have 'empire' over men" because of nature and "men ... are actually obeying" women.

Pursuing a future matriarchy would tend to risk sacrificing feminists' position in present social arrangements, and many feminists are not willing to take that chance, according to Eller. "Political feminists tend to regard discussions of what utopia would look like as a good way of setting themselves up for disappointment", according to Eller, and argue that immediate political issues must get the highest priority.

"Matriarchists", as typified by male-conceived comic book character Wonder Woman, were criticized by Kathie Sarachild, Carol Hanisch, and some others.

== In religious thought ==
=== Exclusionary ===
Some theologies and theocracies limit or forbid women from being in civil government or public leadership or forbid them from voting, effectively criticizing and forbidding matriarchy. Within none of the following religions is the respective view necessarily universally held:

- In Islam, some Muslim scholars hold a view that female political leadership should be restricted, according to Anne Sofie Roald. The restriction has been attributed to a hadith of Muhammad, (Note: "Koranic verse 4: 34 ... has been used to denounce female leadership" ("4: 34" spaced so in original), but the verse may apply to family life rather than to politics. Roald (2001), pp. 189–190 cites, respectively, Badawi, Jamal, Gender Equity in Islam: Basic Principles (Indianapolis: American Trust Publications, 1995), p. 38 & perhaps passim, and Roald, Anne Sofie, & Pernilla Ouis, Lyssna på männen: att leva i en patriarkalisk muslimsk kontext, in Kvinnovetenskaplig Tidskrift, pp. 91–108 (1997).) the founder and last prophet of Islam. The hadith says, according to Roald, "a people which has a woman as leader will never prosper." (Note: Another translation is, "a people which has a woman as a leader will not succeed." The 2001 author's paraphrase of the hadith, "the people who have a female leader will not succeed", is at Roald (2001), p. 185.) The hadith's transmission, context, and meaning have been questioned, wrote Roald. According to Roald, the prohibition has also been attributed as an extension of a ban on women leading prayers "in mixed gatherings". Possibly, Roald noted, the hadith applies only against being head of state and not other high office. One source, wrote Roald, would allow a woman to "occupy every position except that of khalīfa (the leader of all Sunni Muslims)." One exception to the head-of-state prohibition was accepted without a general acceptance of women in political leadership, Roald reported. Political activism at lower levels may be more acceptable to Islamist women than top leadership positions, said Roald. The Muslim Brotherhood has stated that women may not be president or head of state but may hold other public offices but, "as for judiciary office, .... [t]he majority of jurispudents ... have forbidden it completely." In a study of 82 Islamists in Europe, according to Roald, 80% said women could not be state leaders but 75% said women could hold other high positions. In 1994, the Muslim Brotherhood said that "social circumstances and traditions" may justify gradualism in the exercise of women's right to hold office (below head of state). Whether the Muslim Brothers still support that statement is unclear. As reported in 1953, Roald reported later, "Islamic organizations held a conference in the office of the Muslim Brothers .... [and] claim[ed] ... that it had been proven that political rights for women were contrary to religion". Some nations have specific bans. In Iran at times, according to Elaheh Rostami Povey, women have been forbidden to fill some political office roles because of law or because of judgments made under the Islamic religion. According to Steven Pinker, in a 2001–2007 Gallup poll of 35 nations having 90% of the world's Muslims, "substantial majorities of both sexes in all the major Muslim countries say that women should be allowed to vote without influence from men ... and to serve in the highest levels of government."
- In Rabbinical Judaism, among orthodox leaders, a position, beginning before Israel became a modern state, has been that for women to hold public office in Israel would threaten the state's existence, according to educator Tova Hartman, who reports the view has "wide consensus". When Israel ratified the international women's equality agreement known as CEDAW, according to Marsha Freeman, it reserved nonenforcement for any religious communities that forbid women from sitting on religious courts. According to Freeman, "the tribunals that adjudicate marital issues are by religious law and by custom entirely male." "'Men's superiority' is a fundamental tenet in Judaism", according to Irit Umanit. According to Freeman, Likud party-led "governments have been less than hospitable to women's high-level participation."
- In Buddhism, according to Karma Lekshe Tsomo, some hold that "the Buddha allegedly hesitated to admit women to the Saṅgha ...." because their inclusion would hasten the demise of the monastic community and the very teachings of Buddhism itself. "In certain Buddhist countries—Burma, Cambodia, Laos, Sri Lanka, and Thailand—women are categorically denied admission to the Saṅgha, Buddhism's most fundamental institution", according to Tsomo. Tsomo wrote, "throughout history, the support of the Saṅgha has been actively sought as a means of legitimation by those wishing to gain and maintain positions of political power in Buddhist countries."
- Among Hindus in India, the Rashtriya Swayamsevak Sangh, "India's most extensive all-male Hindu nationalist organization," (Note: Although India is majority Hindu, it is officially secular, per Bacchetta (2002), p. 157.) has debated whether women can ever be Hindu nationalist political leaders but without coming to a conclusion, according to Paola Bacchetta. The Rashtriya Sevika Samiti, a counterpart organization composed of women, believes that women can be Hindu nationalist political leaders and has trained two in Parliament, but considers women only as exceptions, the norm for such leadership being men.

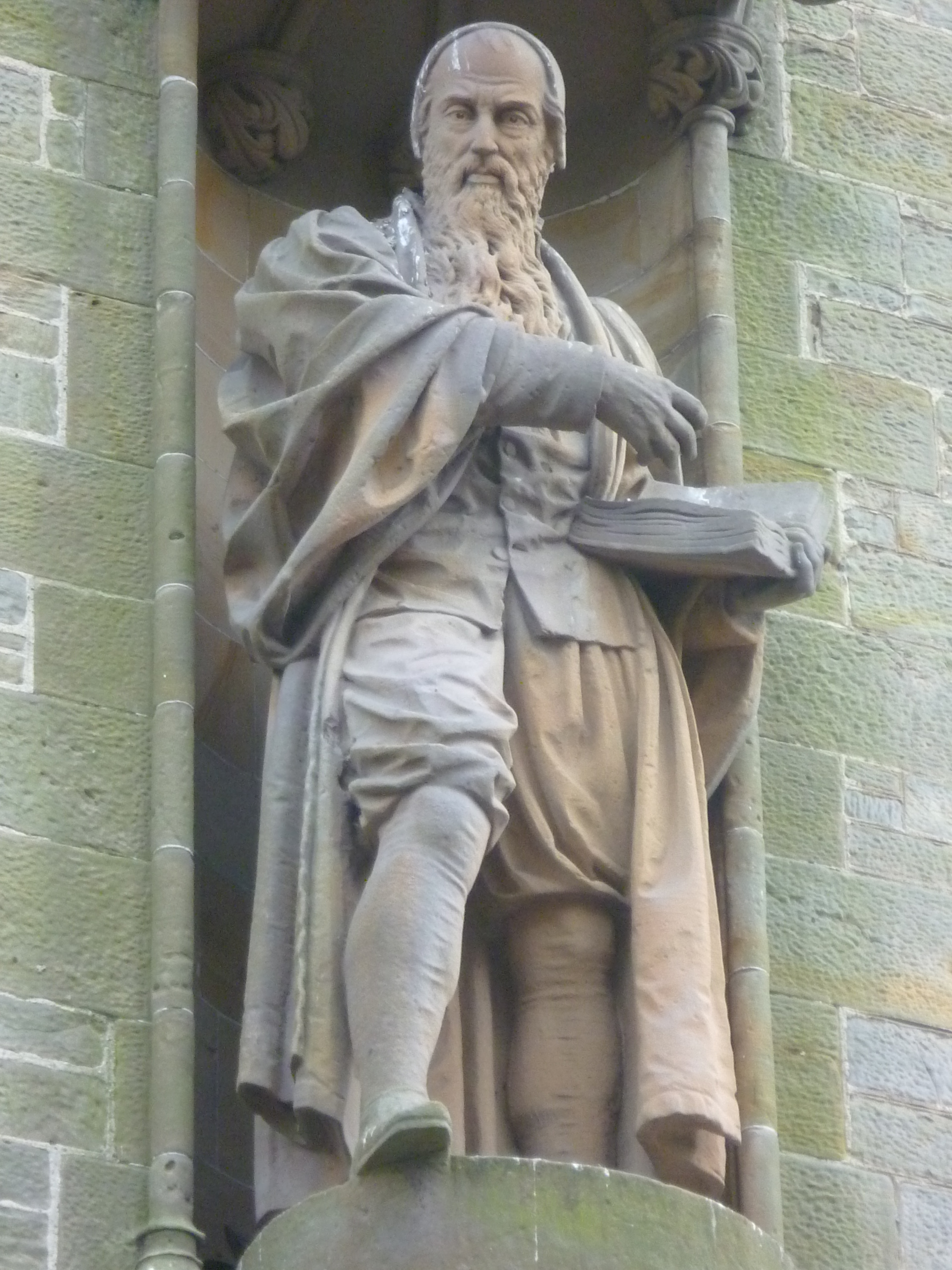
John Knox

- In Protestant Christianity, considered only historically, in 1558, John Knox (Maria Stuart's subject) wrote The First Blast of the Trumpet against the Monstrous Regiment of Women. According to Scalingi, the work is "perhaps the best known analysis of gynecocracy" and Knox was "the most notorious" writer on the subject. According to an 1878 edition, Knox's objection to any women reigning and having "empire" (Note: "I am assured that God hath reueled to some in this our age, that it is more then a monstre in nature, that a woman shall reigne and haue empire aboue man.") over men was theological and it was against nature for women to bear rule, superiority, dominion, or empire above any realm, nation, or city. (Note: "To promote a woman to beare rule, superioritie, dominion or empire aboue any realme, nation, or citie, is repugnant to nature, contumelie to God, a thing most contrarious to his reueled will and approued ordinance, and finallie it is the subuersion of good order, of all equitie and iustice[.]") Susan M. Felch said that Knox's argument was partly grounded on a statement of the apostle Paul against women teaching or usurping authority over men. According to Maria Zina Gonçalves de Abreu, Knox argued that a woman being a national ruler was unnatural and that women were unfit and ineligible for the post. Kathryn M. Brammall said Knox "considered the rule of female monarchs to be anathema to good government" and that Knox "also attacked those who obeyed or supported female leaders", including men. Robert M. Healey said that Knox objected to women's rule even if men accepted it. On whether Knox personally endorsed what he wrote, according to Felch, Jasper Ridley, in 1968, argued that even Knox may not have personally believed his stated position but may have merely pandered to popular sentiment, itself a point disputed by W. Stanford Reid. On the popularity of Knox's views, Patricia-Ann Lee said Knox's "fierce attack on the legitimacy of female rule ... [was one in which] he said ... little that was unacceptable ... to most of his contemporaries", although Judith M. Richards disagreed on whether the acceptance was quite so widespread. According to David Laing's Preface to Knox's work, Knox's views were agreed with by some people at the time, the Preface saying, "[Knox's] views were in harmony with those of his colleagues ... [Goodman, Whittingham, and Gilby]". Writing in agreement with Knox was Christopher Goodman, who, according to Lee, "considered the woman ruler to be a monster in nature, and used ... scriptural argument to prove that females were barred ... from any political power", even if, according to Richards, the woman was "virtuous". Some views included conditionality; while John Calvin said, according to Healey, "that government by a woman was a deviation from the original and proper order of nature, and therefore among the punishments humanity incurred for original sin". (Note: Original sin, in Christianity, a state of sin, or violation of God's will, due to Adam's rebellion in the Garden of Eden) Nonetheless, Calvin would not always question a woman's right to inherit rule of a realm or principality. Heinrich Bullinger, according to Healey, "held that rule by a woman was contrary to God's law but cautioned against [always] using that reason to oppose such rule". According to Richards, Bullinger said women were normally not to rule. Around 1560, Calvin, in disagreeing with Knox, argued that the existence of the few women who were exceptions showed that theological ground existed for their exceptionalism. Knox's view was much debated in Europe at the time, the issue considered complicated by laws such as on inheritance and since several women were already in office, including as Queens, according to de Abreu. Knox's view is not said to be widely held in modern Protestantism among leadership or laity.

=== Inclusionary ===
According to Eller, feminist thealogy conceptualized humanity as beginning with "female-ruled or equalitarian societies", until displaced by patriarchies, and that in the millennial future "'gynocentric,' life-loving values" will return to prominence. This, according to Eller, produces "a virtually infinite number of years of female equality or superiority coming both at the beginning and end of historical time".

Among criticisms is that a future matriarchy, according to Eller, as a reflection of spirituality, is conceived as ahistorical, and thus may be unrealistic, unreachable, or even meaningless as a goal to secular feminists.

== In popular culture ==
=== Ancient theatre ===
- As criticism in 390 BC, Aristophanes wrote a play, Ecclesiazusae, about women gaining legislative power and governing Athens, Greece, on a limited principle of equality. In the play, according to Mansfield, Praxagora, a character, argues that women should rule because they are superior to men, not equal, and yet she declines to assert publicly her right to rule, although elected and although acting in office. The play, Mansfield wrote, also suggests that women would rule by not allowing politics, in order to prevent disappointment, and that affirmative action would be applied to heterosexual relationships. In the play, as Mansfield described it, written when Athens was a male-only democracy where women could not vote or rule, women were presented as unassertive and unrealistic, and thus not qualified to govern. The play, according to Sarah Ruden, was a fable on the theme that women should stay home.

=== Literature ===
- Elizabeth Burgoyne Corbett's New Amazonia: A Foretaste of the Future is an early feminist utopian novel (published 1889), which is matriarchal in that all political leadership roles in New Amazonia are required to be held by women, according to Duangrudi Suksang.
- Roquia Sakhawat Hussain's Sultana's Dream is an early feminist utopia (published 1905) based on advanced science and technology developed by women, set in a society, Ladyland, run by women, where "the power of males is taken away and given to females," and men are secluded and primarily attend to domestic duties, according to Seemin Hasan.
- Marion Zimmer Bradley's book, The Ruins of Isis (1978), is, according to Batya Weinbaum, set within a "female supremacist world".
- In Marion Zimmer Bradley's book, The Mists of Avalon (1983), Avalon is an island with a matriarchal culture, according to Ruben Valdes-Miyares.
- In Orson Scott Card's Speaker for the Dead (1986) and its sequels, the alien pequenino species in every forest are matriarchal.
- In Sheri S. Tepper's book, The Gate to Women's Country (1988), the only men who live in Women's Country are the "servitors," who are servants to the women, according to Peter Fitting.
- Élisabeth Vonarburg's book, Chroniques du Pays des Mères (1992) (translated into English as In the Mothers' Land) is set in a matriarchal society where, due to a genetic mutation, women outnumber men by 70 to 1.
- N. Lee Wood's book Master of None (2004) is set in a "closed matriarchal world where men have no legal rights", according to Publishers Weekly.
- Wen Spencer's book A Brother's Price (2005) is set in a world where, according to Page Traynor, "women are in charge", "boys are rare and valued but not free", and "boys are kept at home to do the cooking and child caring until the time they marry".
- Elizabeth Bear's Carnival (2006) introduces New Amazonia, a colony planet with a matriarchal and largely lesbian population who eschew the strict and ruthless population control and environmentalism instituted on Earth. The Amazonians are aggressive, warlike, and subjugate the few men they tolerate for reproduction and service, but they are also pragmatic and defensive of their freedom from the male-dominated Coalition that seeks to conquer them.
- In Naomi Alderman's book, The Power (2016), women develop the ability to release electrical jolts from their fingers, thus leading them to become the dominant gender.
- Jean M. Auel's Earth's Children (1980–2011).
- In the SCP Foundation, which is a collaborative online horror fiction website, the Daevites are an ancient society in which women took the roles of both religious and political leaders, and men often take the place of slaves

=== Film ===
- In the 2011 Disney animated film Mars Needs Moms, Mars is ruled by a female Martian known only as The Supervisor, who long ago deemed all male Martians to the trash underground and kept all women in functioning society. The film reveals The Supervisor, for an unexplained reason, changed how Martian society was being run (from children being raised by parents) to Martian children being raised by "Nannybots". The Supervisor sacrifices one Earth mother every twenty-five years for that mother's knowledge of order, discipline and control, which is transferred to the Nannybots who raise the female Martians.
- The 2023 film Barbie depicts a world (Barbieland) ruled entirely by Barbies in positions such as doctors, scientists, lawyers, and politicians while the Kens spend their time at the beach.

=== Television ===
- In the special "The Powerpuff Girls Rule!!!", Blossom wanted society to based on the African elephant, in which only women vote and "Stinky & Dumb" men are relegated to house tasks.
- In the Sliders episode "The Weaker Sex", Arturo finds himself in a mayoral race in a world where men are treated as "the weaker sex" and women hold the positions of power and influence. Hillary Clinton is shown as being the President of the United States.
- In the Futurama episode "Amazon Women in the Mood", the crew land on a planet ruled by giant muscular women.
- Fumi Yoshinaga's manga Ōoku: The Inner Chambers, published between 2004 and 2020, follows an alternate history of Japan in which most of the male population is killed by a disease, resulting in a matriarchal society. It is best known in the United States by its 2023 Netflix adaptation of the same name.

== Other animals ==
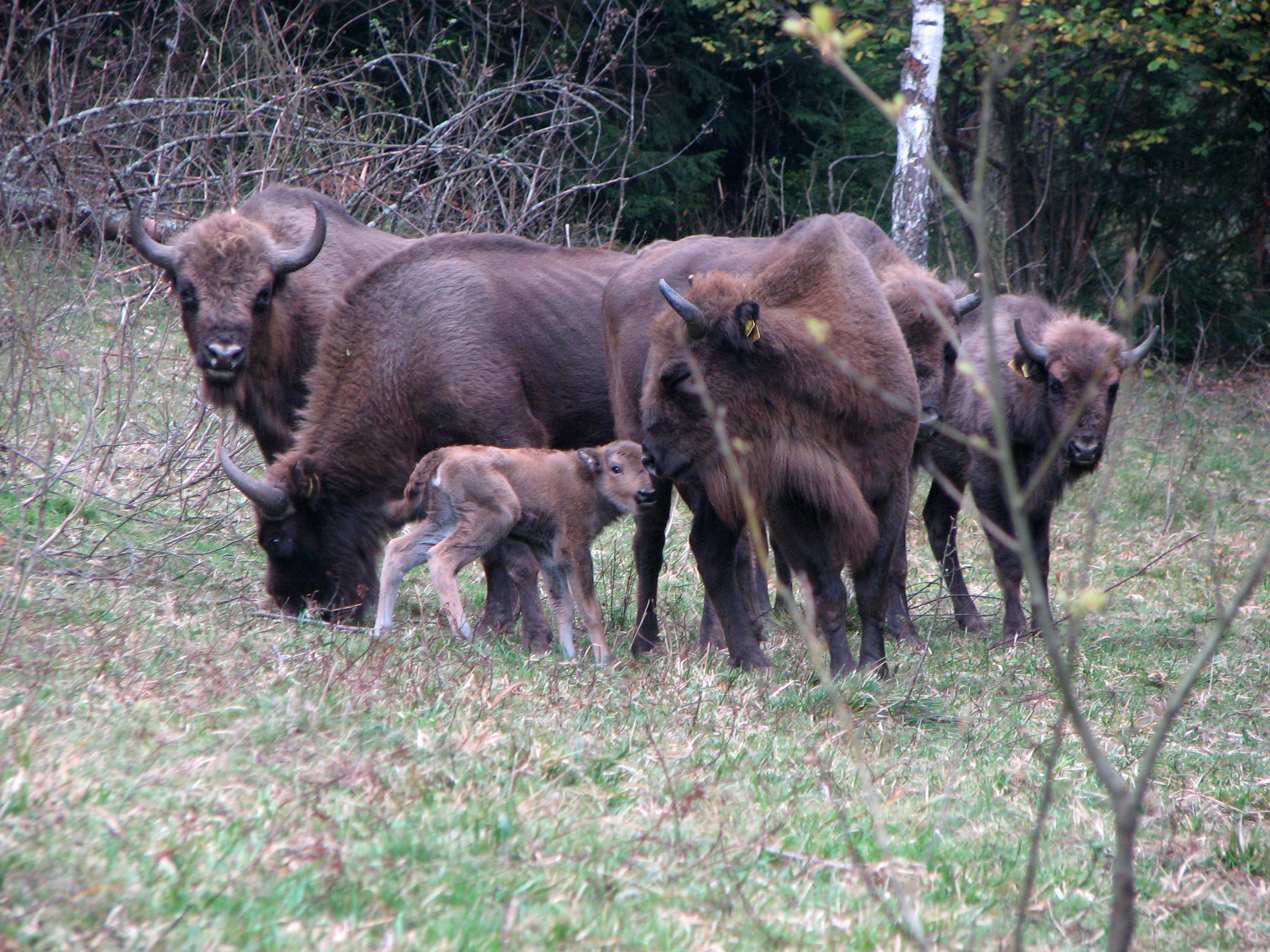
European bison social structure has been described as a matriarchy.

Matriarchy may also refer to non-human animal species in which females hold higher status and hierarchical positions, such as among spotted hyenas, elephants, lemurs, naked mole rats, and bonobos. Such animal hierarchies have not been replaced by patriarchy. The social structure of European bison herds has also been described by specialists as a matriarchy – the cows of the group lead it as the entire herd follows them to grazing areas. Though heavier and larger than the females, the older and more powerful males of the European bison usually fulfill the role of satellites that hang around the edges of the herd. Apart from the mating season when they begin to compete with each other, European bison bulls serve a more active role in the herd only once a danger to the group's safety appears. In bonobos, even the highest ranking male will sometimes face aggression from females and is occasionally injured by them. Female bonobos secure feeding privileges and exude social confidence while the males generally cower on the sidelines. The only exceptions are males with influential mothers, so even the rank between the males is influenced strongly by females. Females also initiate group travels.

== See also ==
- Biblical matriarchs
- Bijagós Islands
- Çatalhöyük (arguments over matriarchy at the site)
- Daughter preference
- Female cosmetic coalitions
- Misandry
- Feminism
- Feminist separatism
- Gender role
- List of matrilineal or matrilocal societies
- Marianismo
- Masculism
- Matriarch (elder)
- Patriarchy
- Trưng sisters
- Women in government
- Women in the EZLN
