= The Myth of Matriarchal Prehistory =

2000 book by Cynthia Eller

- Author: Cynthia Eller
- Subject: Matriarchy
- Publisher: Beacon Press
- Publication date: 2000
- Pages: 276 pp.
- ISBN: 978-0-8070-6792-5
- OCLC: 42798148

The Myth of Matriarchal Prehistory: Why An Invented Past Will Not Give Women a Future is a 2000 book by Cynthia Eller that seeks to deconstruct the theory of a prehistoric matriarchy. This hypothesis, she says, developed in 19th century scholarship and was taken up by 1970s second-wave feminism following Marija Gimbutas. Eller, a retired professor of religious studies at Claremont Graduate University, argues in the book that this theory is mistaken and its continued defence is harmful to the feminist agenda.

== Thesis ==
Eller sets out to refute what she describes as feminist matriarchalism as an "ennobling lie".

She argues that the feminist archaeology of Marija Gimbutas had a large part in constructing a late twentieth-century feminist myth of matriarchal prehistory. She questions whether Gimbutas's archaeological findings adequately support the claim that these societies were matriarchal or matrifocal. She says that we know of no cultures in which paternity is ignored and that the sacred status of goddesses does not automatically increase female social status. Eller concludes that inventing prehistoric ages in which women and men lived in harmony and equality "is a burden that feminists need not, and should not bear." In her view, the "matriarchal myth" tarnishes the feminist movement by leaving it open to accusations of "vacuousness and irrelevance that we cannot afford to court."

== Criticism ==
Max Dashu wrote that Eller might, in some cases, lack sufficient ability to distinguish clearly between cases in scholarly studies and expressions of the burgeoning Goddess movement, including novels, guided tours, market-driven enterprises."

== Editions ==
- The Myth of Matriarchal Prehistory: Why An Invented Past Will Not Give Women a Future, Beacon Press (2000), ISBN 978-0-8070-6792-5.

== See also ==
- Matriarchal religion
- Heide Göttner-Abendroth
- The Inevitability of Patriarchy
- Third-wave feminism
- When God Was a Woman
- Steven Goldberg
