= Heide Göttner-Abendroth =

German activist

Heide Göttner-Abendroth (born February 8, 1941, in Langewiesen, Germany) is a German feminist advocating matriarchy studies (also modern matriarchal studies), focusing on the study of matriarchal or matrilineal societies.

== Life ==
Göttner-Abendroth was born during World War II, and at the age of 12 moved with her parents from East Germany to West Germany. She has a PhD in philosophy from LMU Munich (1973) and worked as a teacher in philosophy at LMU Munich from 1973 to 1983. She became active in second-wave feminism from 1976 and came to be considered one of the pioneers of women's studies in West Germany at the time.

Göttner-Abendroth describes increased conflict with other academics over her theories. This struggle for mainstream academic acceptance of matriarchal studies is the subject of Edition Amalia's Die Diskriminierung der Matriarchatsforschung: Eine moderne Hexenjagd (2003), a collection of essays from various scholars within the emerging field. The chapter by Göttner-Abendroth is titled 'Prevent them by all means!' The discrimination against modern matriarchy research and its practical consequences (translated from the German).

In her extended online biography, Göttner-Abendroth describes separation from LMU Munich as less than agreeable: "Given that she was prevented from continuing to lecture at the University, she works as an independent scholar in a precarious and difficult financial situation." Nonetheless, she persisted in her research and writing. In 1986, she founded the International Academy for Modern Matriarchal Studies and Matriarchal Spirituality (HAGIA). In 1992, she served as a visiting professor at the University of Innsbruck Austria and received funding from the University of Bremen. In the years since 1998 she has been active in the "Institute of Archaeomythology", based in California (US), and began to publish books on mythology and matriarchy through HAGIA or through independent publishers.

Between 2003 and 2011, Göttner-Abendroth's research into matriarchal society had an increasingly international focus, as her conception of matriarchal studies began to focus on its relationship to indigenous studies and the direct input and involvement of indigenous peoples. This global outlook led to a series of international conferences on the nature and purpose of matriarchal studies, each year including progressively more participants from existing non-Western matriarchal cultures.

The 2012 publication of Matriarchal Societies: Studies on Indigenous Cultures Across the Globe, marked a degree of change in Göttner-Abendroth relationship to mainstream academia: it was the first time one of her books had been accepted through scholarly peer review with an international academic publisher, Peter Lang.

In 2014, Göttner-Abendroth was tagged by Oxford University Press as the co-editor-in-chief for the "matriarchal studies" section of Oxford Bibliographies., along with Senacan scholar Barbara Alice Mann. The two continue in this role as of 2020.

== Criticism and reception ==
Göttner-Abendroth's work has been widely rejected by mainstream academia, as she lacks formal training in anthropology or archaeology and operates outside academic channels, self-publishing much of her research. Scholars in ethnology, archaeology, and religious studies dispute the scientific methodology of her "Modern Matriarchal Studies" and the structures of her HAGIA Academy, noting that her claims regarding prehistoric matriarchies rely on outdated historical views that cannot be empirically verified. Religious studies scholar Christoph Uehlinger compared her approach to anthroposophy and theosophy, characterizing it as pseudo-scientific neo-mythology. Anthropologists have further highlighted a pattern of uncorrected factual errors and selective bias in her writings, viewing her theories as ideological storytelling rather than rigorous academic research.

== Relationship to matriarchal studies and Academy Hagia ==
Modern matriarchal studies stands in the tradition of 1970s second wave feminism, pioneered by Merlin Stone's When God Was a Woman.

Göttner-Abendroth founded the "International Academy for Modern Matriarchal Studies and Matriarchal Spirituality" (HAGIA) in 1986. It aims to combine the "intellectual, political, artistic, and spiritual" in its events, which range from "matriarchal mystery festivals" to international academic conferences.

In her role as HAGIA director, Göttner-Abendroth organized three World Congresses on Matriarchal Studies, in 2003, 2005, and 2011.

Since 2014 Göttner-Abendroth has served as one of two editors in charge of Oxford University Press's "Oxford Bibliographies" project listing for matriarchal studies (along with Mann). This publication aims to provide an authoritative listing of historical and contemporary sources related to matriarchal studies, and includes annotations and commentary.

== Bibliography ==
- Göttner-Abendroth, Heide (2017). "Matriarchal studies: Past debates and new foundations". Asian Journal of Women's Studies. 23 (1): 2–6. doi:10.1080/12259276.2017.1283843.
- The Goddess and Her Heros. Matriarchal Religion in Mythology, Fairy-Tales and Poetry. Anthony Publishing Company, Stow USA 1995. (Die Göttin und ihr Heros – a study in matriarchal religion, Verlag Frauenoffensive, Munich 1980–1997.)
- Matriarchal Societies: Studies on Indigenous Cultures Across the Globe. Peter Lang Inc, 2013, ISBN 9781433125126
- The Dancing Goddess. Principles of a Matriarchal Aesthetic. Beacon Press, Boston USA 1991. (Die tanzende Göttin Verlag Frauenoffensive, Munich 1982–2001.)
- Für die Musen, Verlag Zweitausendeins, Frankfurt 1988–1999.
- Für Brigida, Verlag Zweitausendeins, Frankfurt 1998 and 2000.
- Werlhof, Claudia von (2003). Die Diskriminierung der Matriarchatsforschung: eine moderne Hexenjagd. Edition Amalia. ISBN 978-3-905581-21-8.
- Das Matriarchat, vol I, history of research on matriarchy, Kohlhammer Verlag, Stuttgart 1988–1995;
- Das Matriarchat, vol II 1, contemporary matriarchal societies in East Asia, Indonesia, Oceania, Kohlhammer Verlag, Stuttgart 1991 und 1999;
- Das Matriarchat, vol II 2, contemporary matriarchal societies in America, India, Africa Kohlhammer Verlag, Stuttgart 2000.
- Inanna. Gilgamesch. Isis. Rhea, Verlag Ulrike Helmer, Königstein 2004.
- Fee Morgane. Der Heilige Gral, Verlag Ulrike Helmer, Königstein 2005.
- Frau Holle. Das Feenvolk der Dolomiten, Verlag Ulrike Helmer, Königstein 2005.
- Matriarchat in Südchina – matriarchy in South China, Kohlhammer Verlag, Stuttgart 1998; film documentary: Im Matriarchat der Mosuo – matriarchy of the Mosuo, Academy Hagia, 1993.
- with Kurt Derungs, Matriarchate als herrschaftsfreie Gesellschaften (1997) ISBN 978-3-905581-01-0

== See also ==
- Patriarchy
- Matriarchal religion
