= Landscape mythology =

Landscape mythology and anthropology of landscape (Landschaftsmythologie, Landschaftsethnologie) are terms for a field of study advocated since about 1990 by Kurt Derungs (born 1962 in St. Gallen, Switzerland). Derungs describes the field as an interdisciplinary approach to landscape combining archaeology, ethnology and mythology.

Derungs interprets landscape features in terms of "totemism, shamanism and matriarchal mythology", claiming that his approach qualifies as neither esotericism nor as positivism but as a "sound alternative" to both. His interpretations are strongly influenced by the hypothesis of a matriarchal structure of society and a cult of the Great Goddess in Neolithic Europe, and he associates megalithic monuments and elements of traditional fairy tales with these ideas.

Since 1994, Derungs manages the edition amalia publishing house, where his books appear besides publications on related topics (matriarchy, Great Goddess) by other authors. Derungs is popular in German Neopagan circles, but has received little attention in academic literature.

== Bibliography ==
- AMALIA oder Der Vogel der Wahrheit. Mythen und Märchen aus Rätien im Kulturvergleich. Bündner Monatsblatt Verlag Desertina, 1994, ISBN 3-905241-41-2
- Geheimnisvolles Basel. Sakrale Stätten im Dreiland. Edition Amalia, 2004 (1st ed. 1999), ISBN 3-905581-24-8
- Geheimnisvolles Zürich. Sakrale Stätten am Zürichsee. Edition Amalia, 2004, ISBN 3-905581-22-1
- Keltische Frauen und Göttinnen. Matriarchale Spuren bei Kelten, Pikten und Schotten. Edition Amalia, 1995
- Kultplatz Zuoz/ Engadin. Die Seele einer alpinen Landschaft. Geheimnisvolles Graubünden. Edition Amalia, 2001, ISBN 3-905581-12-4
- Landschaften der Göttin. Avebury, Silbury, Lenzburg, Sion. Kultplätze der Grossen Göttin in Europa. Edition Amalia, 2000, ISBN 3-905581-10-8
- Magisch Reisen Bern. Sagenhaftes Wandern zu Kultsteinen vom Jura bis zum Berner Oberland. Edition Amalia, 2003, ISBN 3-905581-19-1
- Matriarchate als herrschaftsfreie Gesellschaften. Edition Amalia, 1997, ISBN 3-905581-01-9
- Mythen und Kultplätze im Drei-Seen-Land. Edition Amalia, 2002, ISBN 3-905581-17-5
- Mythologische Landschaft Deutschland. Edition Amalia, 1999
- Mythologische Landschaft Schweiz. Edition Amalia, 1997, ISBN 3-905581-02-7
- Der psychologische Mythos. Frauen, Märchen und Sexismus. Manipulation und Indokrination durch populärpsychologische Märcheninterpretation: Freud, Jung & Co. Edition Amalia, 1996, ISBN 3-9520764-6-5
- Quellen Kulte Zauberberge. Landschaftsmythologie der Ostschweiz und Vorarlbergs. Edition Amalia, 2005, ISBN 3-905581-26-4
- Schwarze Madonna im Märchen. Mythen und Märchen von der Schwarzen Frau. Edition Amalia, 1998, ISBN 3-905581-07-8
- Struktur des Zaubermärchens. Eine fundierte Darstellung der historischen Märchenforschung und Mythologie. Band I und II. Paul Haupt, Bern
- Die ursprünglichen Märchen der Brüder Grimm. Edition Amalia, 1999, ISBN 3-905581-08-6
- Magische Stätten der Heilkraft.Marienorte mythologisch neu entdeckt. Quellen, Steine, Bäume und Pflanzen. Edition Amalia, 2006, ISBN 3-905581-25-6

== See also ==
- Landscape archaeology
- Landscape history
- Modern Matriarchal Studies
- Marija Gimbutas
- John Michell (writer) (an author discussing "landscape mythology" in the context of pseudoscientific metrology)
