= After the Development of Agriculture =

Feminist calendar era, epoch 8000 BCE

After the Development of Agriculture (ADA) is a system for counting years forward from 8000 BCE, making 2026 the year 10026 ADA. It was developed in feminist thealogy. It is not often used.

A.D.A. is similar to the Holocene calendar system, with which the year 2026 is written as 12026 HE.

== History of A.D.A. ==
"In 1978, artist and intellectual Merlin Stone advocated that feminists adopt a new dating system, according to which 1978 was 9978 ADA—After the Development of Agriculture". (Note: Merlin Stone, author of When God Was a Woman) Stone criticized "Christian dating [because it] skews time in a manner that makes the A.D. era the 'real' time and the B.C. era, which is enormously larger, 'a vast emptiness of the unknown or unreal.'" "Stone uses a dating system that counts 8000 B.C.E.—when women presumably invented agriculture—as the year zero." Stone said it was the midpoint of the 2,000-year-long proto-Neolithic period (Stone's classification of the period). "Others in the feminist spirituality movement have adopted her dating convention as a more 'feminized' way of reckoning history than the standard one that counts from the advent of Jesus." The "system [was meant] to reflect the cultural accomplishments of women."

Whether agriculture began 8,000 years before the Common Era may not be agreed with among scholars, but it is close to some estimates. It also did not begin in all places at the same time.

The A.D.A. calendar system is not often used.

== See also ==
- Holocene Era (also called Human Era)—a similar system, which adds 10,000 years to Common Era
- History of agriculture
- Neolithic Revolution or Agricultural Revolution in the Stone Age, on the beginnings of agriculture in many human cultures
