= Alice Schlegel =

Anthropologist

- Other name: Alice Schlegel Biery
- Education: Northwestern University
- Scientific career
- Thesis: Domestic authority and female autonomy in matrilineal societies (1971)

Alice Schlegel is an anthropologist known for her work on adolescence. She was elected a fellow of the American Association for the Advancement of Science in 1972.

== Education and career ==
Schlegel attended Smith College from 1952 until 1954, and then graduated with a B.A. from Northwestern University. She went on to earn an M.A. from the University of Chicago (1959) and a Ph.D. from Northwestern University in 1971. Following her Ph.D., she held academic positions at multiple institutions including the University of Baroda, India, Museum of Northern Arizona, University of Tübingen, University of Frankfurt. In 1980 she joined the faculty of the University of Arizona and was promoted to professor in 2005. As of 2021, she is a retired professor of anthropology at the University of Arizona.

== Research ==
Schlegel's research touched on multiple areas including adolescence, the human need for physical contact, and the segregation of people by age and gender.

== Selected publications ==
- Schlegel, Alice; Barry, Herbert. "Adolescence: An Anthropological Inquiry".
- Gaulin, Steven J. C.; Schlegel, Alice (1980-12-01). "Paternal confidence and paternal investment: A cross cultural test of a sociobiological hypothesis". Ethology and Sociobiology. 1 (4): 301–309. doi:10.1016/0162-3095(80)90015-1. ISSN 0162-3095.

== Awards and honors ==
Schlegel was elected fellow of the American Association for the Advancement of Science in 1972.
