= Steven Goldberg =

Sociology academic and author (1941–2022)

Steven Brown Goldberg (14 October 1941 – 17 December 2022) was an American sociologist who was the chair of the Department of Sociology at the City College of New York from 1988 until his retirement in 2008.

== Biography ==
Goldberg was the son of Israel J. and Claire (née Brown) Goldberg. He grew up in New York City. He joined the American Sociological Association and served in the United States Marine Corps between 1963 and 1969. He graduated from Ricker College with a Bachelor of Arts in 1965, his M.A. from the University of New Brunswick/University of Toronto in 1965/1967–1969, and his PhD (supervised by Charles Winick, Edward Sagarin, and Michael Eric Levin) from the Graduate School and University Center of the City University of New York in 1977–1978.

He was long-listed in The Guinness Book of World Records for having been rejected sixty-nine times by fifty-five different publishers.

He and has taught at City College of New York since 1970. He is most widely known for his theory of patriarchy, which explains male domination through biological causes, and was also a guest lecturer at Marlboro College (1986), the Ludwig von Mises Institute for Austrian Economics/Princeton University (1991), and the Committee for the Scientific Investigation of Claims of the Paranormal/Presidential Commission on the Assignment of Women in the Armed Forces (1992), listed in publications by Gale Research, the International Biographical Centre, and the American Biographical Institute, and the first non-medical fellow of the American Psychiatric Association/American Board of Psychiatry and Neurology. In 2018, he won an Albert Nelson Marquis Lifetime Achievement Award.

== Books ==
- The Inevitability of Patriarchy: Why the Biological Difference Between Men and Women Always Produces Male Domination (New York, New York: William Morrow and Company, 1973), 256 Pp., ISBN 9780688001759.
- When Wish Replaces Thought: Why So Much of What You Believe Is False, (Buffalo, New York: Prometheus Books, 1991–1992), 216 Pp., ISBN 9780879757113.
- Why Men Rule: A Theory of Male Dominance (Chicago, La Salle, and Peru, Illinois: Open Court Publishing Company, 1993), 254+XII Pp., ISBN 9780812692365.
- Fads and Fallacies in the Social Sciences (Amherst and New York, New York: Humanity Books, Prometheus Books 2003), 234 Pp., ISBN 9781591020042.
- Mathematical Elegance: An Approachable Guide to Understanding Basic Concepts (New Brunswick, New Jersey, New York, New York, London, Abingdon-on-Thames, and Oxford: Transaction Publishers, Routledge, Taylor and Francis, and Informa, 2014–2015 and 2017), 123+XVI Pp., ISBN 9781412855136.
