= Merlin Stone =

American author, sculptor, and professor of art and art history

- Born: Marilyn Claire Jacobson; September 27, 1931; Flatbush, Brooklyn, New York, United States
- Died: February 23, 2011 (aged 79); Daytona Beach, Florida, United States
- Education: University of Buffalo; California College of Arts and Crafts
- Occupations: Author, sculptor, professor
- Employer(s): State University of New York at Buffalo, Albright-Knox Art Gallery, University of California Berkeley
- Notable work: When God Was a Woman
- Television: Goddess Remembered documentary
- Movement: Goddess movement
- Partner: Lenny Schneir
- Children: 2
- Awards: A Metallic Art Medal Award from Erasmus Hall High School and two Albright-Knox Annual Sculpture Awards (1962 and 1965)
- Honours: Honorary doctoral degree awarded by the California Institute of Integral Studies

Merlin Stone (born Marilyn Jacobson; September 27, 1931 – February 23, 2011) was an American author, artist and academic. She was an important thinker of the feminist theology and Goddess movements and is best-known for her book When God Was a Woman.

== Biography ==
Merlin Stone was born in Flatbush, Brooklyn, New York. She attended P.S. 217 and Erasmus Hall High School, where she graduated in 1949 with a Metallic Art Medal Award. After enrolling at the University of Buffalo later that year and marrying in 1950, she continued her studies while raising her children, ultimately earning a B.S. and teaching certificate in art (with a minor in journalism) from the institution in 1958. She became interested in archaeology and ancient religions from her study of ancient art.

From 1958 to 1967, she worked as a teacher and sculptor, exhibiting widely and executing numerous commissions. During this period, she was divorced from her first husband in 1963 and taught at Buffalo State College as an assistant professor of art (1962) and her alma mater (by now a SUNY university center) as an assistant professor of sculpture (1966).

In 1968, she received an interdisciplinary M.F.A. from the California College of Arts and Crafts. While based in Oakland and Berkeley, California from 1967 to 1972, she taught at the University of California, Berkeley's extension program, commenced research into ancient culture in earnest and expanded her practice to include kinetic sculpture, liquid light shows, performance art and collaborations with engineers.

She spent a decade on research before writing the book published in the UK as The Paradise Papers and then in the U.S. as When God Was a Woman (1976). It describes her theory of how the Hebrews suppressed goddess-worshipping religions practiced in Canaan and how their reaction to what she says were existing matriarchial and matrilineal societal structures shaped Judaism and thus Christianity. Her theory builds on the ideas of Robert Graves, but rather than starting from his work, Stone gathered material from the "libraries, museums, universities, and excavation sites of the United States, Europe and the Near East." She observed within these materials "the sexual and religious bias of many of the erudite scholars of the nineteenth and twentieth centuries", and challenges many of their conclusions, raising doubts about the criticisms of Graves's theories.

Her other major work, Ancient Mirrors of Womanhood, collects stories, myths, and prayers involving goddess figures from a wide variety of world religions, ancient and otherwise. Stone's hypotheses are radical and challenging to the accepted views of antiquity. She is the author of numerous short stories, book reviews, and essays, including 3,000 Years of Racism.

Stone's book When God Was a Woman had a profound effect on the international Goddess movement of the 1970s and 1980s. She was featured in the 1989 documentary Goddess Remembered.

After residing in London (1972-1974; 1975) and Quadra Island, British Columbia (1974-1975), she and her life partner, Lenny Schneir, met in Miami Beach, Florida in 1976 while Stone (who had been recently widowed by her second husband) was serving as a caregiver for her father. They lived in New York City until 2005, when they relocated to Daytona Beach, Florida. She was diagnosed with pseudobulbar palsy in 2008 and died of dementia complications in 2011.

== Written works ==
=== Books ===
- Stone, Merlin (1976). The Paradise Papers: The Suppression of Women's Rites. London: Virago Press. ISBN 9780704328051. Republished as:
  - —— (1976). When God Was a Woman. New York: Dial Press. ISBN 9780803794740.
- —— (1979). Ancient Mirrors of Womanhood Volume I: Our Goddess and Heroine Heritage. Illustrated by Cynthia Stone. New York: New Sibylline Books. ISBN 9780960335206.
- —— (1979). Ancient Mirrors of Womanhood Volume II: Our Goddess and Heroine Heritage. Illustrated by Cynthia Stone. New York: New Sibylline Books. ISBN 9780960335213. Reprinted in one volume:
  - —— (1984). Ancient Mirrors of Womanhood: A Treasury of Goddess and Heroine Lore from Around the World. Illustrated by Cynthia Stone. Beacon Press. ISBN 9780807067192.

=== Pamphlets ===
- —— (1981). 3000 Years of Racism. New York: New Sibylline Books. ISBN 9780960335220.

=== Articles ===
- —— (July 1973). "The Paradise Papers". Spare Rib (18): 6–8.
- —— (Spring 1978). "The Three Faces of Goddess Spirituality" (PDF). Heresies. 2 (1): 2–4.
- —— (Spring 1978). "9978: Repairing the Time Warp". Heresies. 2 (1): 125–126.
- —— (Fall 1978). "Macha". Lady-Unique-Inclination-of-the-Night. 3. New Brunswick, NJ: Sowing Circle Press: 17–21.
- —— (May 1988). "The Goddess and Evolution". Green Egg: A Journal of Awakening the Earth. 21 (81): 8.
- Merlin Stone (1989). "Reclaiming the Goddess: An Interview with Merlin Stone". Common Ground (Interview). Interviewed by Barbara Booher.

=== Contributions ===
- —— (1979). "When God Was a Woman". In Christ, Carol P; Plaskow, Judith (eds.). Womanspirit Rising. Harper & Row. ISBN 9780060613778.
- "The Great Goddess: Who was She?", "The Three Faces of Goddess Spirituality", and "Ancient Mirrors of Womanhood" in Spretnak, Charlene, ed. (1982). The Politics of Women's Spirituality: Essays by Founding Mothers of the Movement. New York: Anchor Books. ISBN 9780385172417.
- —— (1986). "The Plasting Project". In Zahava, Irene (ed.). Hear the Silence: Stories by Women of Myth, Magic & Renewal. Crossing Press. ISBN 9780895942111.
- "Goddess Worship in the Ancient Near East" published in both Eliade, Mircea, ed. (1987). The Encyclopedia of Religion. Vol. 6. ISBN 0029094801. and Seltzer, Robert M., ed. (1989). Religions of Antiquity. Macmillan. ISBN 978-0028973739.
- —— (1990). "The Gifts from Reclaiming Goddess History". In Zweig, Connie (ed.). To Be a Woman: The Birth of the Conscious Feminine. Los Angeles: J.P. Tarcher. ISBN 9780874775617.
- Orenstein, Gloria (1990). The Reflowering of the Goddess. Foreword by Merlin Stone. Oxford, England: Pergamon Press. ISBN 978-0080351780.
- Stone, Merlin (1991). "When God Was a Woman". At the Leading Edge: New Visions of Science, Spirituality, and Society (Interview). Interviewed by Michael Toms. Larson Publications. ISBN 9780943914510.
- Patai, Raphael (1990). The Hebrew Goddess. Foreword by Merlin Stone. Detroit, MI: Wayne State University Press. ISBN 978-0814322710.

== Audio-visual works ==
- When God Was a Woman, Pacifica Radio, 1978.
- The Return of the Goddess, Canadian Broadcasting Corporation, 1986.
- Read, Donna (1989). Goddess Remembered (Documentary). Women and Spirituality: The Goddess Trilogy. National Film Board of Canada.
- The Voice of Earth (with Olympia Dukakis) at Williams College and the William Carlos Williams Center in 1990.

== See also ==
- After the Development of Agriculture
- Feminist art movement in the United States
