= The Inevitability of Patriarchy =

1973 book by Steven Goldberg

The Inevitability of Patriarchy: Why the Biological Difference Between Men and Women Always Produces Male Domination
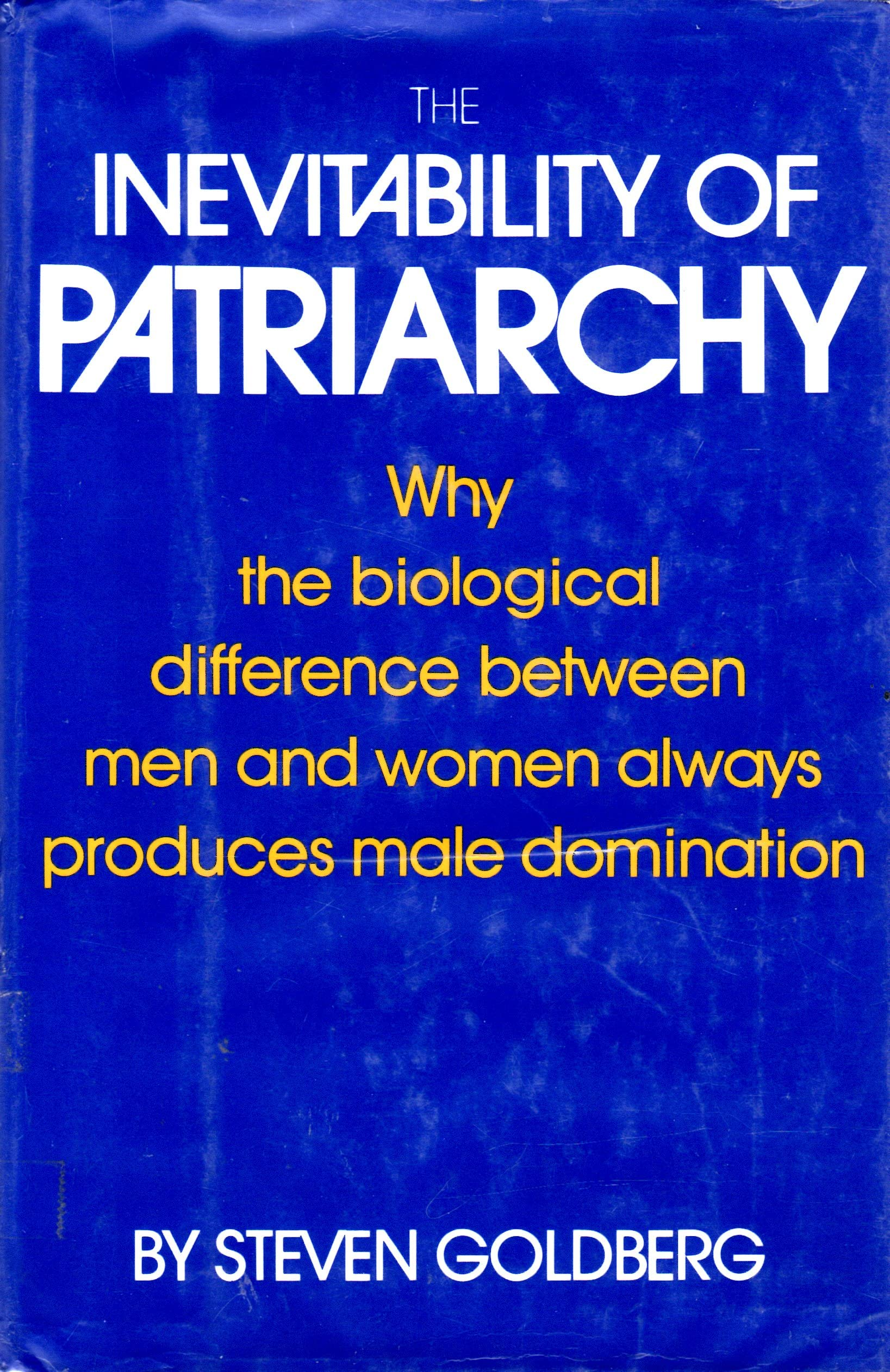
- Author: Steven Goldberg
- Language: English
- Subject: Patriarchy
- Publisher: William Morrow and Company
- Publication date: 1973
- Publication place: United States
- Media type: Print (hardback)
- Pages: 256
- ISBN: 978-0-688-00175-9
- OCLC: 673305
- Dewey Decimal: 301.41/1
- LC Class: HQ1067 .G64

The Inevitability of Patriarchy: Why the Biological Difference Between Men and Women Always Produces Male Domination is a book by Steven Goldberg published by William Morrow and Company in 1973. The theory proposed by Goldberg is that social institutions that are characterised by male dominance may be explained by biological differences between men and women (sexual dimorphism), suggesting male dominance (patriarchy) could be inevitable.

Goldberg later refined articulation of the argument in Why Men Rule (1993). The main difference between the books is a shift of emphasis from citing anthropological research across all societies, to citing evidence from the workforce in contemporary western societies.

== Abstract ==
Goldberg reviews literature, gathering evidence from expert witnesses (both primary and secondary sources) to demonstrate that each of three distinct patterns of recognised human social behaviour (institutions) has been observed in every known society. He proposes that these three universal institutions, attested as they are across independent cultures, suggest a simple psychophysiological cause, since physiology remains constant, as do the institutions, even across variable cultures—a universal phenomenon suggests a universal explanation.

The institutions Goldberg examines and claims to be universal among all known societies are patriarchy (men dominating higher hierarchical positions), male attainment (activities which provide higher status are related to male physiology) and male dominance (cultural expectation of male leadership and control). The hypothetical psychophysiological phenomenon he proposes to explain them, he denotes by the expression differentiation of dominance tendency. He explains this refers to dominance behaviour being more easily elicited from men on average than from women on average. In other words, he theorises a biologically mediated difference in preferences.

Goldberg next provides expert witnesses from several disciplines regarding correlations between behaviour and the hormone testosterone, which are known to be causative in several cases, including dominance preference. He concludes with the hypothesis that testosterone is a necessary (but not sufficient) condition for the development of the institutions he examined. In other words, without testosterone, the institutions would not develop—it must be part (but not all) of an explanation for their universality.

Finally, Goldberg proposes that if patriarchy is indeed biologically based, it will prove to be inevitable; unless a society is willing to intervene biologically on the male physiology.

== Overview ==
Inevitability starts with a quote that summarises the main "nature over nurture" point of the book.

- Numquam naturam mos vinceret; est enim ea semper invicta.

Custom will never conquer nature; for it is always invincible.

— Marcus Tullius Cicero, Tusculanae Disputationes, c. 45 BC.

The book has ten chapters divided into four parts (I–IV), and an addendum. The five chapters of the first part outline Goldberg's theory of patriarchy. The second part contains two chapters of engagement with alternative views. The third part speculates about possible cognitive differences between men and women. Part four consists of a single chapter of general sociological commentary on broader community discussion of the relationships between men and women. The addendum that concludes the book is offered in support of the anthropological consensus described in chapter 2 of part I, but has been considered by some to be the most valuable part of the total work, including Goldberg himself.

== Reception ==
In Key Issues in Women's Work (2nd ed., 2004), sociologist Catherine Hakim compares four competing theories of male dominance, including Goldberg's theory of patriarchy as well as her own preference theory, and notes the strengths and weaknesses of patriarchy theory. For example, women's dislike of female bosses is consistent with Goldberg's theory. Goldberg's "is the only theory that can explain some of the more inconvenient facts about women as well as men". "No other theory has been offered which can explain women's rejection of females in authority". She comments that Goldberg's theory "contrasts interestingly with the mind-games that Western intellectuals like to play", but concludes that Goldberg's thesis has yet to be fully proven. In her book's final chapter, after reviewing the empirical evidence, she notes that none of the four competing theories fully explains women's subordination, but that preference theory rules out the salience of sex and gender, given the evidence for female heterogeneity.

The Marxist anthropologist Eleanor Leacock takes a more political view of Goldberg's work. In a response to Goldberg's The Inevitability of Patriarchy, she characterizes Goldberg's theories as simplistic and irresponsible: "To consign the grim brutalities of abused power we see everywhere about us to what amounts to masculine 'original sin' not only denies the historical and ethnographic record... but seriously disarms all of us, as humanity, in the urgency of our need to understand and redirect our social life if we would insure ourselves a future."

Biological anthropologist Frank B. Livingstone criticizes Goldberg's understanding of causation in evolution, characterizing the evolutionary model presented in The Inevitability of Patriarchy as "absolutely backward". According to Livingstone, social behavior drives evolution rather than the other way around: "Contrary to Goldberg, I do not believe that a genetic or physiological change will occur first and then cause social or behavioral change. In fact, just the opposite, the behavior or way of life of a population determines the fitness values of the genotypes, and this changes the genetic characteristics of the population."

=== Selection of Reviews 1973–1993 ===
- Eleanor Maccoby, "Sex in the social order", Science 182 (November, 1973): 469ff. [Review of The Inevitability of Patriarchy]
- Eleanor Leacock. 'The Inevitability of Patriarchy'. American Anthropologist new series 76 (1974): 363-365.
- Frank B Livingstone. 'The Inevitability of Patriarchy'. American Anthropologist new series 76 (1974): 365-367.
- Steven Goldberg. 'Response to Leacock and Livingstone'. American Anthropologist new series 77 (1975): 69-73.
- Eleanor Leacock. 'On Goldberg's Response'. American Anthropologist new series 77 (1975): 73-75.
- Frank B Livingstone. 'Reply to Goldberg'. American Anthropologist new series 77 (1975): 75-77.
- Joan Huber. 'The Inevitability of Patriarchy'. The American Journal of Sociology 81 (1974): 567-568.
- Steven Goldberg. 'Comment on Huber's Review of the Inevitability of Patriarchy'. The American Journal of Sociology 82 (1976): 687-690.
- Joan Huber. 'Huber's Reply to Goldberg'. The American Journal of Sociology 82 (1976): 690-691.
- The September/October issue of Society vol. 23, no. 6 (1986) was devoted to discussion of The Inevitability of Patriarchy. It contained two essays by Goldberg and seven by critics.

== See also ==
Books describing biological influences on gender roles, written for non-specialists

- Brain Sex (1989)
- The Blank Slate (2002)

Related articles

- Sex and psychology

== Bibliography ==
- Baillargeon RH, Zoccolillo M, Keenan K, Côté S, Pérusse D, Wu HX, Boivin M, Tremblay RE. "Gender differences in physical aggression: A prospective population-based survey of children before and after 2 years of age". Developmental Psychology 43 (2007): 13–26.
- Downes, Stephen M. "Evolutionary Psychology". Stanford Encyclopedia of Philosophy, 2008.
- Knight, Melvin Moses. "The Matriarchate and the Perversion of History". Journal of Social Forces 2 (1924): 569–574.
- Lewens, Tim. "Cultural Evolution". Stanford Encyclopedia of Philosophy, 2007.
- Montagu, MF Ashley. "Introduction" to Marriage Past and Present: A Debate Between Robert Briffault and Bronislaw Malinowski. Boston: Porter Sargent, 1956. [transcript of 1931 debate]
- Morgan, Lewis Henry. Ancient Society: Researches in the Lines of Human Progress from Savagery through Barbarism to Civilization. London: Macmillan & Company, 1877.
- Schlegel, Alice. Male Dominance and Female Autonomy: Domestic Authority in Matrilineal Societies. New Haven, Connecticut: Human Relations Area Files (HRAF) Press, 1972.
