= Elizabeth Gould Davis =

American writer

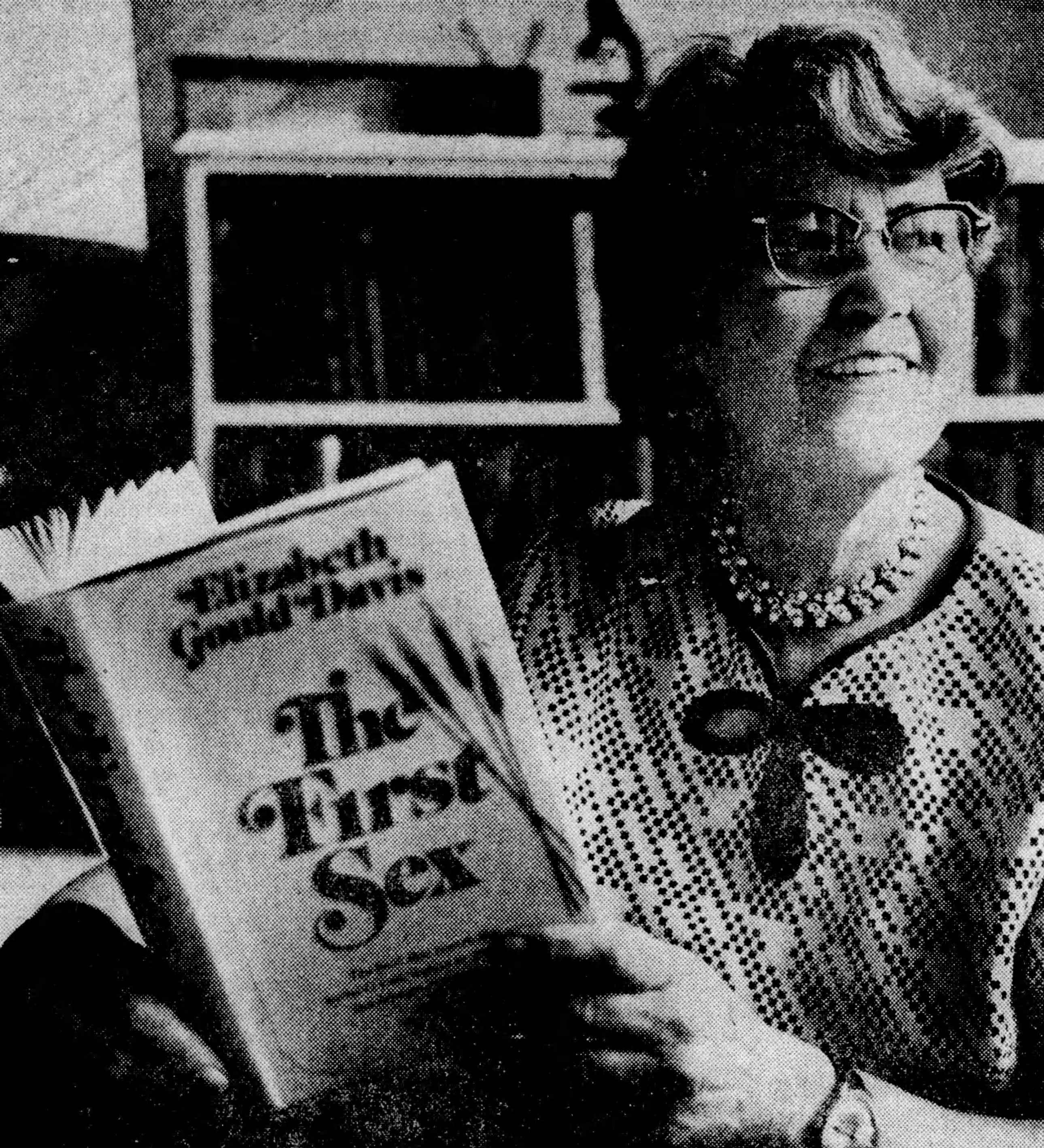
- Davis in 1971
- Born: 1910; Leavenworth, Kansas, United States
- Died: July 30, 1974 (aged 64); Sarasota, Florida
- Education: Master's degree in librarianship
- Alma mater: University of Kentucky
- Occupations: Author, librarian
- Writing career
- Period: 1971
- Notable work: The First Sex
- Movement: Second-wave feminism

Elizabeth Gould Davis (June 23, 1910 – July 30, 1974) was an American librarian who wrote a feminist book called The First Sex.

== Early life and education ==
Davis was born in Leavenworth, Kansas to Colonel Robert Davis and Edwina Bailey McCarty, one of four daughters. The family traveled extensively when she was growing up. She received her A. B. degree from Randolph-Macon College and, after a brief marriage in 1934, went on to earn her master's degree in librarianship at the University of Kentucky in 1951. She worked as a librarian at Sarasota, Florida, and while there, wrote The First Sex.

== The First Sex ==
Davis had originally intended The First Sex to be "a short essay on wrongs towards women" inspired by the death of her sister in 1968. As she researched, she learned more about historical periods when women were in charge, and about subsequent anti-women prejudices. She argued that congenital killers and criminals have two Y chromosomes, that men say they don't mind women being successful but require femininity when feminine qualities work against success, and that a matriarchy should replace the existing patriarchy. Prof. Ginette Castro criticized Davis' position as grounded "in the purest female chauvinism."

Davis died by suicide on July 30, 1974, by shooting herself. According to feminist author Andrea Dworkin, Davis' suicide was largely impacted by the rape she underwent a few years prior in 1971, as well as the cancer she suffered from. Her papers are held by the Charles E. Young Research Library at UCLA.

== Bibliography ==
- 1971: The First Sex, Penguin Books, ISBN 0-14-003504-4
