= Latina lesbian organizations in the United States =

Latina lesbian organizations in the United States are community based organizations that emphasize the intersection of Latina and lesbian identities. Generally combining the social with the political, they emerged in response to the limited availability of spaces that spoke to their racial, gender, and sexual experiences. These groups often addressed political issues specific to their geographical locations and social/cultural/historical contexts. Nationwide organizations focused on larger national issues that impacted immigrants and LGBTQ communities.

These groups emerged in relation to other identity based groups of the civil rights era, including LGBTQ organizations, feminist organizations and Latino and Chicano empowerment groups. These movements were often responding to the racism and ethnocentrism of the Women's Movement, the male centered nature of LGBTQ groups, and homophobia in Latino organizations and the Chicano movement.

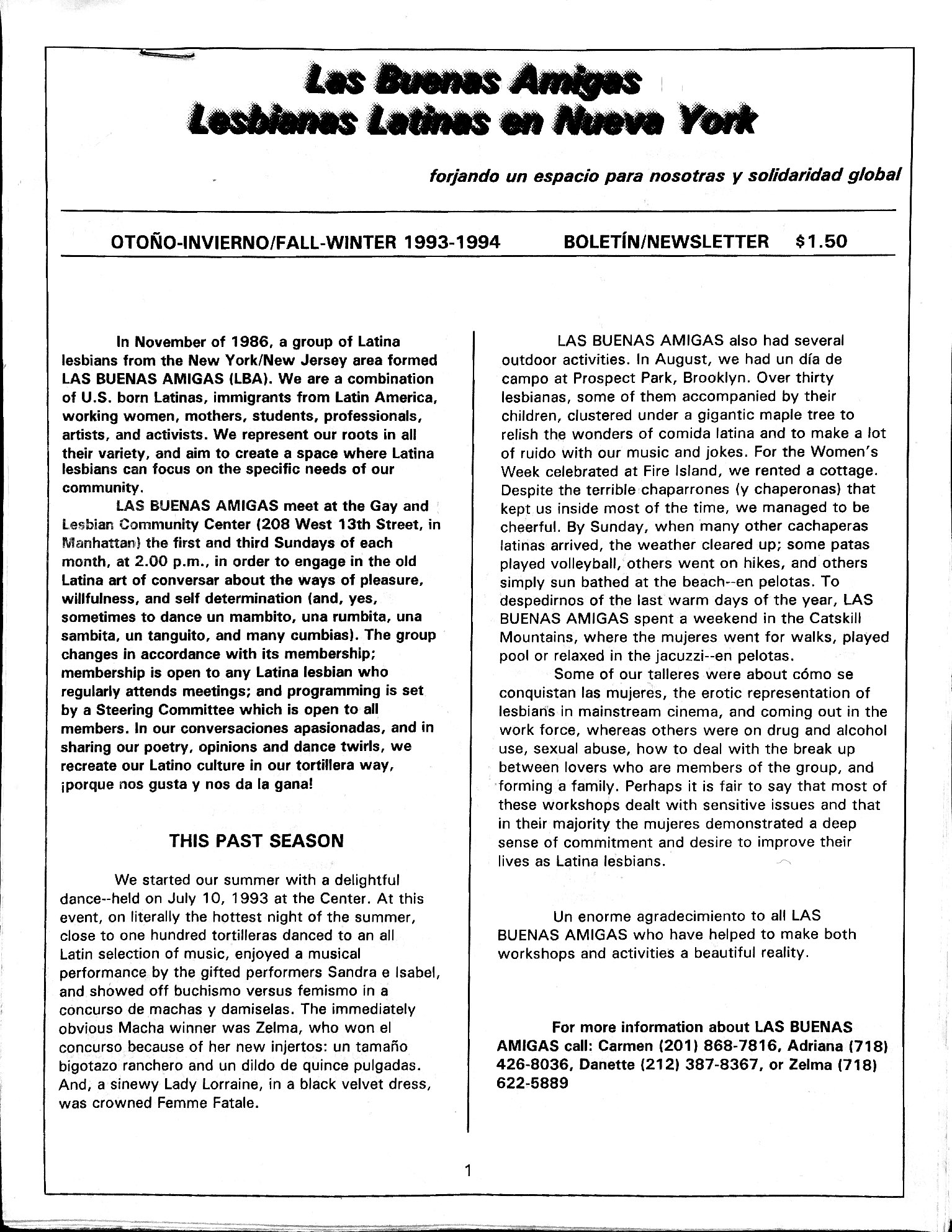
Cover image of Las Buenas Amigas, a Newsletter for Latina Lesbians, 1993.

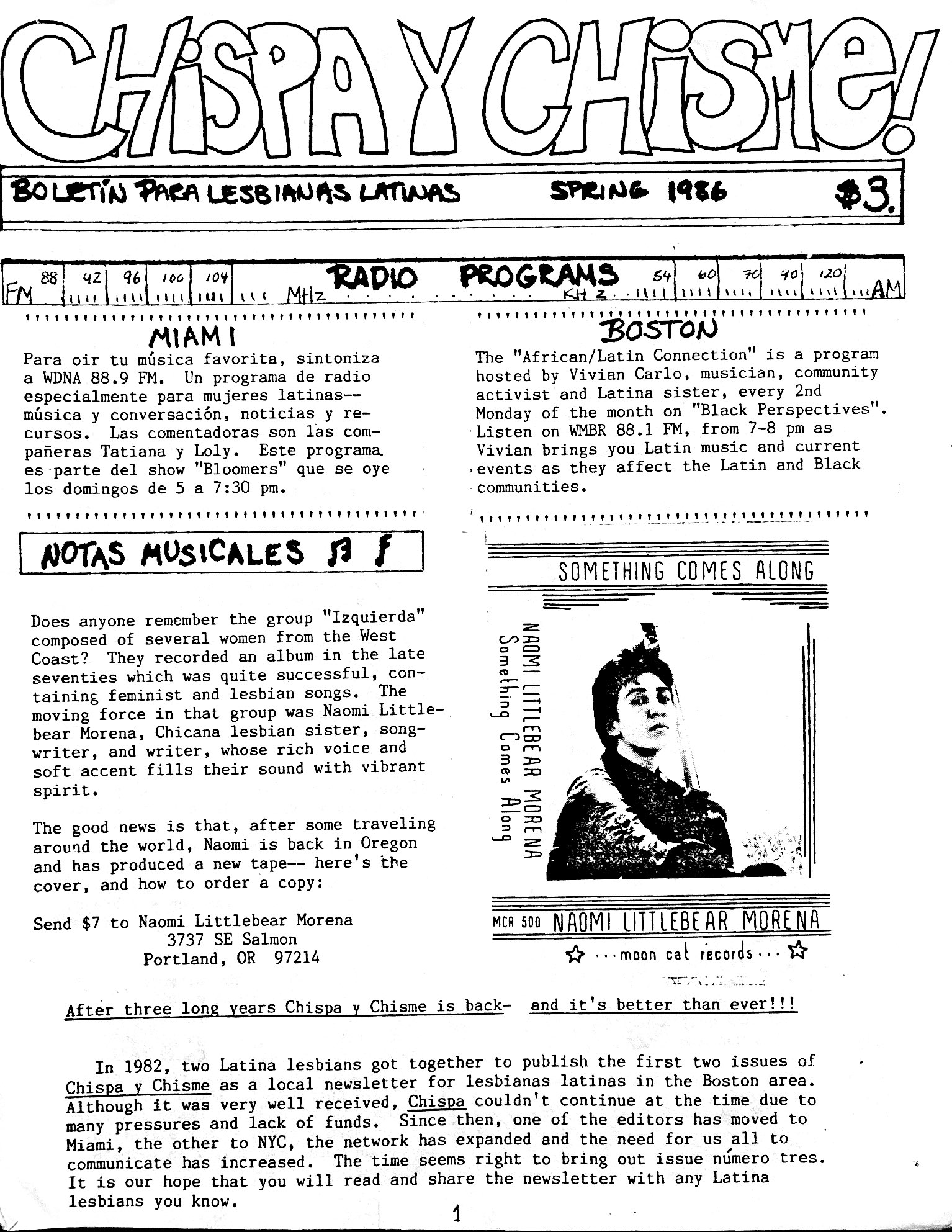
Cover of 1983 Latina Lesbian Newsletter.

Latina lesbian groups created and published several newsletters during the 1980s-1990s as a way to connect with other organizations. These included Conmoción, Las Buenas Amigas, Esto No Tiene Nombre and Chispa y Chisme. For example, during the early 1980s, two Latina Lesbian activists: Loly Carillo and Mariana Romo Carmona worked together to create outreach materials with hopes of gaining network connections with similar identities, and to raise awareness to social and political issues. Together they created a newspaper called Chispa y Chisme. In this newspaper, it was clear that many people within the community did not feel comfortable coming out, and expressing their authentic self, a call to action to create safe spaces without anxieties or fears of discrimination or backlash.

Latina lesbians in the United States were also part of an international network that promoted gatherings or Encuentros, called Encuentro de Lesbianas Feministas de América Latina y del Caribe. Their first Encuentro was in Cuernavaca Mexico, subsequent gatherings met in Costa Rica, Puerto Rico, and Argentina.

Since the 1990s, many of these groups have begun to use other terms such as queer, sapphic, dyke or the culturally specific terms such as tortillera or buchota, as a way to be more inclusive of trans, non-binary, bisexual, and pansexual members.

Latina lesbians as individuals and groups have also worked more intentionally with other racialized and marginalized groups. For example an Allied Media Conference in 2015 included a panel "I See You: Femmes of Color Visibility & Community" that included several members of the Los Angeles Femme of Color Collective. That included femme activists Alyssa Hernandez, Laura Luna Placencia, Dulce Garcia, and others.

== West Coast ==
=== San Francisco Bay Area ===
In the 1980s there was a Latina lesbian organization named Mujerío, they held an "encuentro" or gathering in 1989 at the Marin Headlands.

Latina Lesbians of the East Bay was an organization within the Bay Area for Lesbian identifying Latina's.

Club spaces and dance parties have been important sites of community organizing for lesbians and queers of color, and other marginalized LGBTQ communities. Beginning in the 1980s and into the 1990s, the area around 16th and Mission in San Francisco was home to several gay Latino nightclubs. In San Francisco, the DJ Diane Felix was instrumental in creating a variety of monthly dance parties for queer women and their friends.

Ellas en Acción was founded in 1993. This organization was a Latina lesbian and bisexual community action group that became the first Latina Lesbian group in the U.S. to include the word "bisexual" in its name.

Proyecto ContraSIDA por Vida was a community organization that extended information about safe-sex practices. They began at Eighteenth and Dolores in the Mission District tailoring their services to the broader LGBTQ+ community.

=== Los Angeles ===
Lesbianas Unidas was founded in 1981. The Lesbianas Unidas organization was founded shortly after the (GLLU) Gay Latinos Unidos. Gay Latinos Unidos was also founded in 1981, in Los Angeles. Six months later, the Gay Latino organization, which was originally a male-led organization, opened their space to queer Latinas. Lydia Otero was the President of Gay and Lesbian Latino Unidos in 1989.

During this same time, in 1981 the AIDs pandemic was going on, which affected many members of (GLUU). AIDS impacted the whole community, including the sister organization (LU). The AIDS pandemic led to several deaths, on top of that these communities' medical health needs were not being supported nor addressed. Instead, most of the government funding went towards helping other white queer organizations impacted by AIDs. During this drastic time, Lydia Otero also started another organization named Bienstar, that focused specifically on AIDS prevention, advocacy, and support.

Raza Womyn was a queer organization at UCLA during the 1990s. In 1978, Proposition 6 was passed which sought to expel gay educators from teaching positions. This was pushed by Republican Senator John Briggs and explained his argument behind his bill in a televised debate. Briggs furthered the rhetoric of “parental rights” to rationalize LGBTQ+ discrimination in schools. Raza Womyn, whose members organize around a Muxerista (a Chicana/Latina feminist activist) vision of social justice that rejects patriarchal notions of Chicano nationalism, white and/or middle-class dominated perspectives of feminism, and static definitions of sexual identity while building on the legacy of Chicana/Latina feminist thought.

Izquierda (which means left in Spanish) was a lesbian social activist group from the West Coast that also produced music in the late seventies. Naomi Littlebear Martinez served as the leader of the group.

Terri de la Peña is a Mexican American writer known for her short stories, essays, novels. She is recognized as one of the first authors to publish short stories and novels on Chicana lesbians themes. Her writing explores the complex intergenerational conflicts within Latine communities, surrounding sexuality and belonging. She challenges these stereotypes by providing visibility to Mexicax/ Latinx lesbian experiences in literature and helped create space for generations of queer writers of color.

Gay and Lesbian Latinos Unidos (GLLU), founded in 1981, is recognized for its role as one of the first queer Latine organizations established in Los Angeles. The organization focused on addressing issues such as homophobia within Latino communities, cultural preservation, HIV/AID awareness, and immigration. In 1986, Radio GLLU made history as the first bilingual LGBTQ+ radio program in the United States and strengthened community-building with other queer Latino community members,. The organization played a significant role in organizing the Second National March on Washington to advocate for Lesbian and Gay Rights and for Latino issues on a national stage.

In September 1983, the first National Lesbian of Color Conference was held in Malibu, California. This conference allowed lesbians of color to address intersecting dynamics of sexism, racism, homophobia, and classism. More than 200 individuals attended the conference, which provided the space to discuss identity, culture, politics, and spirituality. A number of influential political activist, artists, scholars, writers, and poets participated at the conference, including Paula Gunn Allen, Beth Brant, Gloria Anzaldúa, Andrea R. Canaan, Joy Harjo, Nancy Reiko Sato, Naomi Littlebear, Kwambe OmDahda, Aleida Rodríguez, Luisah Teish, Nellie Wong, Merle Woo, and Mitsuye Yamada.

The Museum of Social Justice in Los Angeles organized an exhibit "Finding Sequins in the Rubble: Archives of Jotería Memories in Los Angeles" August 24, 2023–February 18, 2024 that included many prominent queer Latinas from Los Angeles, Monica Palacios, Laura M Esquivel, Bamby Salcedo, and Laura Luna. Luna was co-founder of LA Femmes of Color Collective and has worked with Queer & Trans People of Color (QTPOC).

In 2024, the group Butchona began organizing events for lesbians and other queer women to enjoy Mexican and Spanish language music and as a community gathering space. That same year, Zizi Bander and Ty Curiel, began organizing events called "Cafecito and Comunidad" as part of their brand Botitas, as a way to gather queer and trans people of color in Los Angeles and celebrate cultural identity and community.

== Southwest ==
=== Texas ===
==== Austin ====
The Austin Latino Lesbian Gay Organization (ALLGO) founded in 1985, served as a community based organization to support Latino/a LGBTQ individuals in Austin, Texas. The organization sought to improve access to HIV/AIDS treatment and healthcare services. Throughout the mid-1980s and 1990s, ALLGO developed and expanded services that included peer counselors, bilingual case workers, food shelters, and healthcare delivery agencies serving Spanish-speaking individuals. These efforts were further strengthened by members of the organization who were active civic leaders in Austin business, bilingual media, and television sectors. Their involvement in professional networks enhanced ALLGO'S visibility and expanded community outreach. ALLGO continued their activism through marches, protests, HIV/AIDs education initiatives in low-income communities. In 2015, the organization celebrated its 30th anniversary, making their continued services and advocacy for the LGBTQ community in Austin, Texas.

==== Houston ====
Gay and Lesbian Hispanos Unidos (GLHU) was founded in 1978. Its original name was " The Gay Hispanic Caucus", however the name change occurred in the year of 1985. The name change occurred to make the organization more inclusive to women, and not just men. During this time in Houston many Latinx people were facing police harassment, stereotyping by social institutions such as night clubs, and difficult times in finding jobs because their identities were being heavily judged, GLHU made sure to address these issues to the public.

== Midwest ==
=== Illinois ===
==== Chicago ====
Lesbianas Latinas en Nuestro Ambiente (LLENA) was an activist organization that existed from 1988 to 1992. The efforts of both LLENA and Amigas Latinas; which was formed eight years after LLENA, were influenced by the work of two Latina lesbians, Maria Amparo Jimenez and Evettte Cardon. Although they were not the founders, their leadership and determination played a significant role in bringing members of the Latina/o LGBTQ community together. Maria Amparo Jimenez moved to Chicago from Mexico City in the mid-1980s. She observed the lack of visibility that Latina/o communities lacked within the gay press. Her concerns reached Outlines, one of Chicago's most important gay newspapers, where her first column appeared in September 1988. Outlines became the first known gay and lesbian publications in the nation to include a Spanish- language section dedicated to Latina/o and Latin American issues. A member within the organization, Marilyn Morales, came up with the most popular name for the new group, “LLENA,” an acronym for Latina Lesbians en Nuestro Ambiente. This organization was created to create space in Chicago to represent and defend their identities with women of multiple identities, classes, and languages. Their meetings also attracted women of various backgrounds within Latin America like Puerto Rican, Mexican, Cuban, Ecuadorian, Peruvian and Chicanas. This group was the first for many Latina lesbians to meet in a space beyond the bar/club and amongst their own friends. Their meetings discussed issues of homophobia in the Latino community and the invisibility of Latina lesbians in the white mainstream queer community. Eight years later, Amigas Latinas was formed.

Amigas Latinas was founded in 1995 to enhance advocacy to better support Latina lesbians, transgender, and bisexual individuals in Chicago. Amigas Latinas promoted visibility to Latina LGBTQ individuals by participating in various marches. Amigas Buenas began as a small discussion group and later grew to a large volunteer-led organization with monthly pláticas (discussions) at members’ homes. The organization joined the first gay pride march on Halsted Street during 1988 and the first Puerto Rican Day Pride Parade in Humboldt Park. Since 1988 – Chicago had prohibited discrimination against gays and lesbians. In the early 2000s, members marched on 26th Street Mexican Independence Parade through Chicago's Mexican La Villita community.

ALMA Chicago was founded in 1989 during the AIDS epidemic. The organization has focused on advocating for the rights and equality of Latinx LGBTQ+ community. They offer a range of programs that are designed to create inclusivity and support, including leadership development, fellowships for young artist, healthcare services, legal assistance, and housing support. ALMA Chicago, was firstly known as the Association of Latino Men of Action. In 2012, the organization changed its name to the Association of Latinos/as/xs Motivating Action. The organization is recognized as the oldest Latinx organization in the Midwest.

== Northeast ==
=== Massachusetts ===
==== Boston ====
In 1982 Boston, Loly Carrillo and Mariana Romo-Carmona created a newsletter Chispa y Chisme that included writing in both Spanish and English to bring together Latina lesbians in the Boston area. Chispa y Chisme published two issues while being located in Boston and another out of Miami. In 1980 they helped organize a conference La Conferencia de Mujeres Latinas en Boston: La Mujer Latina se Enfrenta a los 1980s. That conference included a range of topics, from herbal medicines to legal and social issues and was keynoted by Hilda Hidalgo, a Puerto Rican lesbian and professor at Rutgers University. The newsletter also mentioned the role of Latina lesbians involved in publishing Our Bodies Ourselves, and contributing to that book's translation into Spanish.

== East Coast ==
=== Maryland ===
==== Washington, D.C. ====
The National Latina/o Lesbian and Gay Organization (LLEGO) is a national organization based in Washington D.C. It was founded in 1987 and composed of Latino/Latina Gay and Lesbian community members. LLEGO provided specialized healthcare to their gay and lesbian Latino/Latina community members. They developed a statewide, nationwide, and international recognition to address the concerns affecting the Latino/Latina Gay and Lesbian community. LLEGO was D.C.’s first Latino LGBTQ national advocacy and rights organization. After attending the International Lesbian and Gay People of Color Conference, members within LLEGO began to re-establish and name themselves from the National Latino/a Lesbian and Gay Activists (NLLGA) to National Latina/o Lesbian and Gay Organization that use the acronym LLEGO. Since the organization's founding in 1987, LLEGO has provided Latina/o Gay and Lesbians with access to forums, conferences, and updates within the organization through their monthly newsletter, Noticias de LLEGO. Their newsletter highlighted issues within the community in Washington, D.C., organizational political, social, and HIV/AIDS, breast cancer and other healthcare related issues.

Durning the 1990s, El Faro Bar opened doors in Adams Morgan, becoming the first Latino LGBTQ bar in Washington, D.C.

==== New York City ====
Salsa Soul Sisters (found 1974) began with Black lesbians who branched off from the Gay Liberation Front (founded 1969). Salsa Soul Sisters drew attention to a lack of recognition for other lesbian of color who would benefit from gathering in community and discuss the intersectionality of race, class, gender, and sexuality. Afro-Latinas lesbians emerged themselves in cultural and community spaces throughout the 1980s. A common question that came up within a variety of different Latino/Latina organizations was how to distinguish or how to spot latinidad. People at the time focused more on physical appearances associated with being Latino rather than shared lived experiences. The Afro-Latina lesbians within the Salsa Soul Sisters understood and challenged societies perspective and their positionality with race, class, gender, and sexuality. The Salsa Soul Sisters expanded not only for Black and Latina lesbians but created inclusivity to Asian American and Indigenous Lesbians, gay, and bisexual individuals. The group consisted of various age gap differences ranging from 17 years old to 55 years old. Members Salsa Soul Sisters consisted of 200 women and developed a newsletter in 1982 called Salsa Soul Gayzette this consisted of information about gatherings, schedules, and social events. Cassandra Grant was a founding member of Salsa Soul Sisters, she is an educator and activist whose work has focused on empowering young people and strengthening community through her teaching. As a founding member of Salsa Soul Sisters, she has played a significant role in amplifying safe spaces for lesbian of color and queer women of color for decades.

Las Buenas Amigas (founded 1986) supported Latina lesbians in New York City. During the 1980s, there was a rapid increase in AIDS, rising violence, and homicides against the LGBTQ Community. Many organizations were centered by gay white men, who obtained the privilege and resources to create spaces that excluded others. This created barriers for lesbian of color limiting their ability to access safe spaces. Las Buenas Amigas is the first known group to have raised awareness about issues specifically affecting Latina lesbians and creating a space that embraced their Latinidad. The individuals who led the organization consisted of eight New York City based Latinas: Aida Santiago, Elizabeth Crespo, Juanita Diaz-Ramos, Dalitza Ramirez, Lili Benson, Lourdes Cintrón, Luz María Germain, and Mariana Romo Carmona. They provided a place that allowed individuals to learn more about education, politics, resistance, and most importantly a space that embraced sisterhood.

Compañeras: Latina Lesbians is an anthology edited by Juanita Ramos. The book features oral histories, poems, essays, short stories, and artwork by Latina lesbians. It explores themes such as identity, migration, family dynamics, homophobia, survival, and cultural pride. The anthology is recognized for giving visibility to the lived experiences of Latina lesbians in the United States and Latin America.

== See also ==
- Chicana feminism
- Chicano Movement
- Hispanic and Latino Americans
- LGBTQ culture in Los Angeles County
- LGBTQ people in the United States
- List of lesbian feminist organizations
- List of LGBTQ-related organizations and conferences
- List of LGBTQ rights organizations in the United States
- White Hispanic and Latino Americans
