= Pima County Public Library =

Public libraries in Arizona, United States

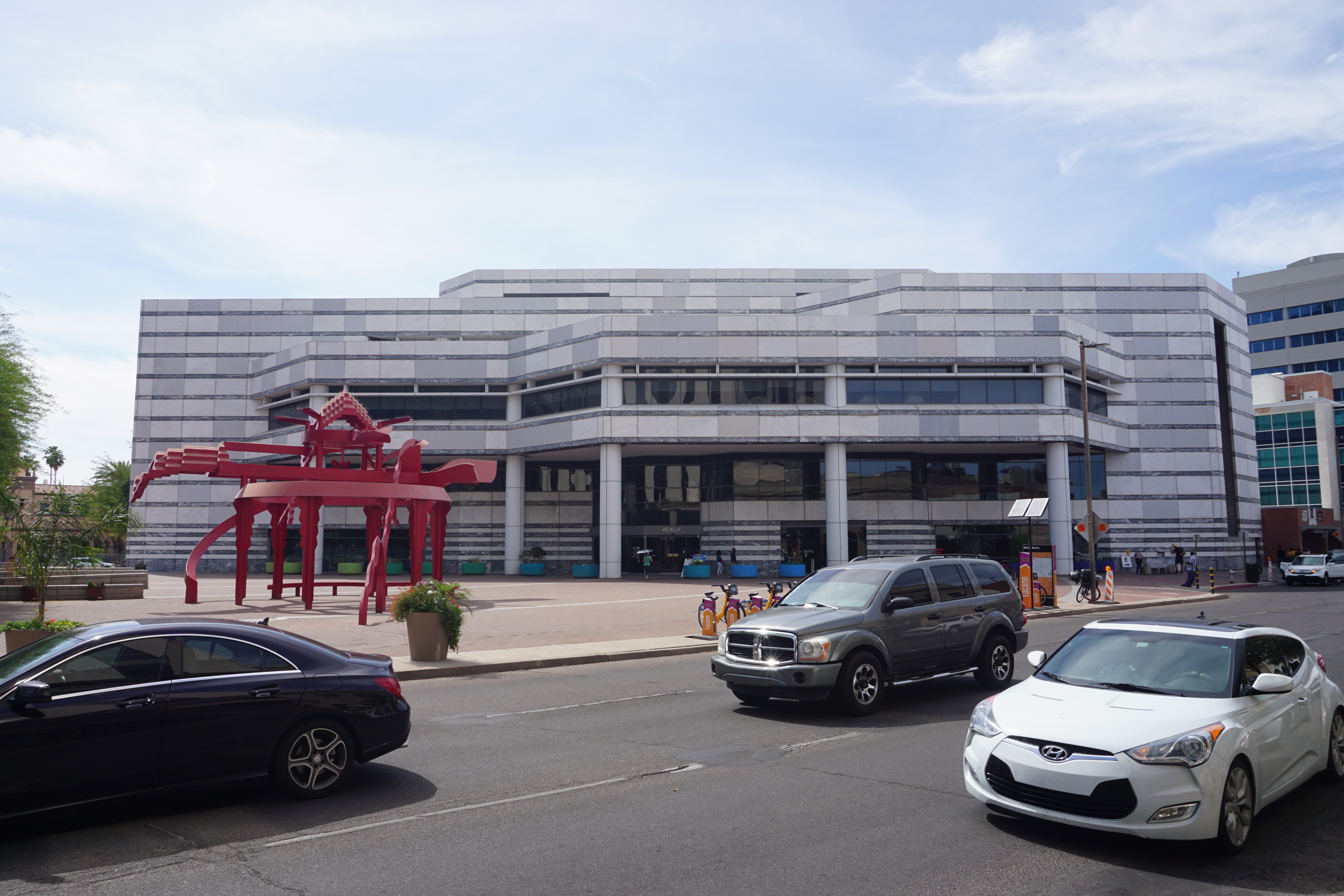
- Joel D. Valdez Main Library in Tucson
- 32°13′30.34″N 110°57′59.32″W
- Location: 101 N. Stone Ave, Tucson, Arizona, USA
- Type: Public library
- Established: 1867

Other information
- Director: Tess Mayer
- Website: www.library.pima.gov

The Pima County Public Library (PCPL) system serves Pima County, Arizona, with a main library and 26 branch libraries as well as a bookmobile service. The system has its headquarters in Tucson with a service area including the city and the surrounding communities of Arivaca, Green Valley, Sahuarita, South Tucson, Ajo, Vail, Marana, Casas Adobes, and Catalina. The town of Oro Valley's library joined the Pima County Public Library system in July 2012.

== Early history ==
The first known public library in Tucson was the 1867 Territorial Library, created by the territorial government for the 10 years that Tucson was the capital of the Arizona Territory, 1867–1877. In January 1877, the Territorial Library had 1,900 legal books and 300 non-legal volumes, which could be checked out by the public during regular hours.

In 1879, a group of women in Tucson began the Tucson Library Association, which was a private organization where members paid a subscription fee to help buy the books that they could borrow. Subscription libraries were popular in the west during this time, but excluded people who could not pay the fees. In March 1883, The women of the Tucson Library Association offered to give their whole private collection to the City of Tucson, if the city council would provide a room and other needed items for a free library.

On June 5, 1883, the city council dedicated the second floor of the new city hall for the purpose of a library, but didn't set aside any money to buy things like book shelves and furniture. It was not until July 6, 1886, after money was raised for the needed items, that the Tucson Public Library first opened its doors. The public library was in the original City Hall (building that also housed local prisoners.

In 1899, philanthropist Andrew Carnegie offered $25,000 to build a public library building in Tucson, if the city council would set aside land and guarantee a fund of $2,000 a year for its upkeep. The city council passed Resolution #20 in 1899, which provided land that was part of the Military Plaza for the site and set up the Library Fund. The new Carnegie Free Library opened in 1901.

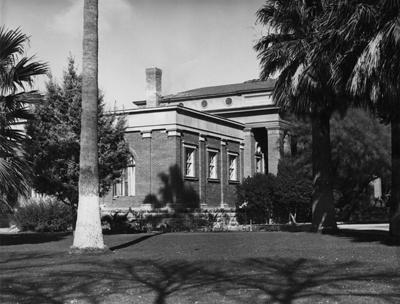
Carnegie Free Library designed by Henry C. Trost

In 1901 in response to a contest, the City of Tucson was gifted $25,000 by Andrew Carnegie to build the iconic Carnegie Public Library (1901 - 1934). It was designed by Henry C. Trost. Carnegie committed to paying up to $25,000 to build a new library on the condition that the City of Tucson supplied a building site and provided $2,000 per year to maintain the library. The Tucson Common Council made good on this deal by passing Resolution Number 20. This resolution earmarked $2,000 per year for library maintenance, and designated a site for the library. The site used constituted a portion of Military Plaza.

Today, the building is the Children's Museum Tucson.

=== Public library name changes ===
1883-1901: Library Hall

1901-1957: Carnegie Free Library

1957-1990: Tucson Public Library (TPL), a change made by Tucson City Council.

1990-2006: Tucson-Pima Public Library (TPPL), reflecting a new funding structure, the result of an agreement between the City of Tucson and Pima County to share library expenses 50-50.

2006–present: Pima County Public Library (PCPL). As of July 1, 2006, the library system is wholly funded and governed by the Pima County and its Board of Supervisors. It is still headquartered in Tucson, AZ.

== Services ==
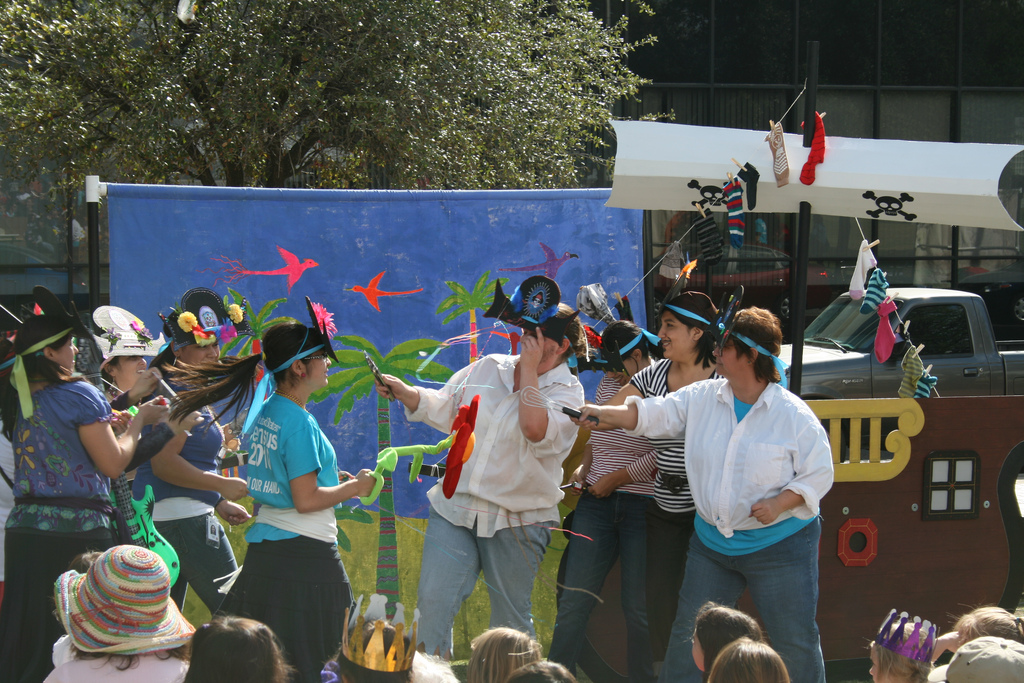
Library staff performing at Story Town

The PCPL system offers a variety of services for both children and adults. For children, storytimes are offered at some library locations. Children can improve their reading skills through the Read to a Dog program. Assistance with homework is also available online, by phone, and at specific library locations. Additional children's activities include El Dia de los Ninos/El Dia de los Libros, and the summer reading program.

PCPL also provides information on clubs, events, and opportunities available to teens. At PCPL, teens can serve as library advocates, participate on an advisory board, and volunteer. Teen programs include MegaMania (an annual fandom con), programming classes, gaming hangouts, and contests for art and poetry. 101 Space at Joel D. Valdez Main Library also provides a safe place for teens to hang out, create, and try out new technologies like 3D printers and green screens.

For adults, a wide range of services are available. Libraries host book clubs, computer classes, author visits, English classes, citizenship classes, and assistance looking and applying for jobs.

PCPL provides a wide range of services and events for the community. Their featured events are posted on the website calendar.

In 2012 PCPL became the first library in the nation to employ a public health nurse on site. A Public Health Nurse from the Pima County Health Department offers on-site expert medical help to assist library customers who turn to the library for help and safety and directs them to social services when appropriate.

== Controversies ==
In 2012, the Tucson Unit of the National Writers Union (NWU) publicly raised objections to the library's collection development policy. In an op-ed piece published in the Tucson Weekly's July 5 edition ("The Pima County Public Library Must Stop Getting Rid of Our Books"), the NWU pointed out that PCPL ranks 28th, next to last, in the number of printed materials per resident in public libraries serving comparable populations, despite that in the same Institute of Museum and Library Services survey the library ranked sixteenth in the amount of money it spent on printed materials per resident. Because it discards books so aggressively, the op-ed piece continued, the library has a sub-par collection of books even though it spends enough money to have a much better quality collection.

In its reply to the piece, the PCPL stated that its collection development policy is geared toward "making room on the shelves for high-demand and popular books and materials in other formats" and pointed out that library circulation had increased from 6.2 million items in 2006 to more than 7.5 million items in 2010. It also stated that readers have the possibility of getting books they want via inter-library loan services or by requesting that the library order the book.

In 2014, KVOA News did two special reports on the library. The first of these highlighted how the library was forced to supplement its standard security service with off-duty officers from the Tucson Police Department. This was done to provide additional security at three of the library branches in which an unusually high number of incidents, ranging from fights to domestic disputes, had taken place.

The second KVOA News report focused on how "hundreds of thousands of dollars in inventory is going missing from the libraries and nobody seems to know why," and how the library, though spending 750,000 dollars a year on security, is not particularly focused on securing or protecting the books, DVDs and CDs in its collection.

== Timeline ==
Year	Event
1883	Library established in 2nd floor of the 1883 Tucson City Hall
1891	The library begins with its first 2,000 volumes
1900	Andrew Carnegie pledges $25,000 to City of Tucson to build library
1901	Architect Henry Charles Trost is hired to build the new library, which is completed in June
1924	Funds are raised to build a children's room in the library
1938	New Main Library dedicated at 200 South Sixth Avenue
1941	Fire destroys dome over central portion of Main Library
1945	Contract with Pima County for provision of county library services established
1946	Ajo Branch Library opens in Ajo, Arizona
1954	Bookmobile service begins in April
1957	On January 7, the name of the Carnegie Free Library was changed to "Tucson Public Library" by the Tucson City Council
1961	Major additions added to Main Library; Himmel Park Branch Library opens
1963	Bookmobile service discontinued; two new book trailers placed in service (one remains by 1977)
1965	Wilmot Branch Library opens
1966	Bookmobile services resume in November
1968	Friends of the Tucson Public Library organize; Woods Branch Library opens
1969	Valencia Branch Library opens
1972	El Rio Branch Library opens; Homebound service established
1973	Library Administration; Technical Services move from Main Library to City Hall Annex
1974	Library begins operation of Green Valley Library; Books by Mail service established
1975	Governmental Reference Library opens in City Hall; Valencia Branch Library expanded; El Pueblo Library opens; Tel-a-Tale service established
1976	Green Valley Library moves to County Government Center; Friends of the Pima-Green Valley Library established
1977	South Tucson book trailer established in permanent location; Marana Library opens; Columbus Branch Library opens—TPL's first library using new CLSI circulation / inventory control system
1978	Mission Branch Library opens
1979	Nanini Branch Library opens; County Jail Library established
1980	Main Library Annex opened in Scottish Rite Temple; Infoline Service established
1982	Himmel Library expansion; Wilmot Branch Library expansion
1984	City of Tucson passes $15 million bond election for new Main Library
1986	Permanent Sam Lena-South Tucson Library opens
1989	Green Valley Library expanded, renamed Joyner-Green Valley Library; Nanini Branch Library expands; Dewhirst-Catalina Branch Library opens
1990	New Main Library on N. Stone opens, consolidating Library Administration, Technical Services, Periodicals, and Government Reference; new facility is 90,000 square feet (8,400 m^{2}); Permanent location of temporary Arivaca Library in mobile unit; The Tucson Public Library is renamed to The Tucson-Pima Public Library to reflect Pima County's increasing role in the library's operations
1991	Himmel Library major refurbishing through L.C. Powell campaign; Sam Lena-South Tucson Library expansion; Kirk-Bear Canyon Library opens; Duesenberry-River Center Library opens
1994	City Bond Election includes $5.5 million for: renovations at Woods and Valencia, and a new Miller Golf Links Library; County Jail Library expands; Dewhirst-Catalina Library relocates; Arson fire at Sam Lena-South Tucson Library
1995	Tucson Public Library officially renamed Tucson-Pima Public Library; Marana Library expands; CLSI/Geac system discontinued. Begin operations on Innovative Interfaces, Inc.
1996	Ajo Library relocates across town plaza; Caviglia-Arivaca Branch Library opens in permanent facility; Valencia Library relocates to begin major renovation
1997	Woods Library relocates to begin major renovation; Ajo Branch Library renamed Salazar-Ajo Branch Library; Friends of the Arivaca Library established; Pima County Bond Election includes $5.25 million for Amphitheater School District/ Library joint-use school-public library (later used for the Oro Valley Library—an affiliate), a mid-town Tucson library, library facilities at the Kino Community Center, and expansion and improvements at South Tucson and Marana.; El Rio Library relocated in slightly larger quarters in Neighborhood Center renovation.; Groundbreaking for Miller-Golf Links Library
1998	Friends of the Kirk-Bear Canyon Library established; Tucson-Pima Library Foundation established; Valencia and Woods leave temporary quarters, returning to newly renovated facilities
1999	Miller-Golf Links Branch Library opens.; Salazar-Ajo Branch Library expands into adjacent storefront location; Complications with Amphi School site leads Pima County Board of Supervisors to relocate the planned northwest library to the Town Oro Valley municipal center site
2000	City Bond election approved and includes $5.5 million for library projects: expansion of Miller-Golf Links to 15,000 SF; 10,000 SF full service library at Quincie Douglas Center; 7,000 SF library and learning center at midtown location.; Groundbreaking for Santa Rosa Learning Center Library
2001	Town of Oro Valley groundbreaking for an affiliate Library; South Tucson expansion; Green Valley expansion; Juvenile Detention Center Library opens
2002	Nanini Library refurbished; Santa Rosa Learning Center Library opens; Southwest Library opens; Oro Valley Library opens as TPPL affiliate; El Pueblo Library relocates in center to larger facility; Teen Resource Center opens at Main
2003	Self-check system installed at Main, Woods Nanini and Green Valley; Main Library renamed for Joel D. Valdez; Main Library plaza redesigned; Jacome Plaza dedication
2004	Golf Links expansion completed; City approved renaming Midtown to the Martha Cooper Branch Library and Learning Center; Self-check system installed at Columbus, Golf Links, River, Valencia, and Bear Canyon branches Installed computer self-management software, pay printing software and filter choice software for public access; Quincie Douglas groundbreaking; Bear Canyon expansion groundbreaking
2005	Martha Cooper Midtown groundbreaking; Bear Canyon expansion completed, 11,000—15,000 sq ft.; Quincie Douglas Branch opened, 10,000 sq ft (930 m^{2}).; Abbett-Marana Branch planning; Flowing Wells Branch planning; Virtual Branch Library established; On-line Homework Help initiated
2006	Pima County takes control of the library system in 2006, and the library becomes the Pima County Public Library; IGA signed for City/County transition; Wilmot Branch 40th Anniversary celebration along with the renaming to the Lewis C. Murphy Memorial Wilmot Branch; Soft opening of Martha Cooper Branch
2007	Renaming of Dan Eckstrom Columbus Branch Library; Abbett Marana Branch groundbreaking; Flowing Wells groundbreaking
2008	June - Wheeler Taft Abbett Sr. Branch Library opened, 20,000 sq ft (1,900 m^{2}).; August – Opening of Flowing Wells Branch, 5,000 sq ft (460 m^{2}).; Implemented new phone system
2009	January – Sahuarita Express Branch Library opened, 2,000 sq ft (190 m^{2})
2011	February – Renovated and expanded to 20,000 sq ft (1,900 m^{2}). Murphy-Wilmot Library re-opens
2012	Grand opening of the Seed Library; Library gets its first Bookbike, housed at Joel D. Valdez Main Library; Oro Valley Library joins PCPL as a branch; Implementation of award-winning Library Nurse Program
2013	Eckstrom-Columbus Branch Library re-opens, renovated and expanded to 15,000 sq. ft.; Library Nurse Program nationally recognized as a 2013 Top Innovator by the Urban Libraries Council
2014	Pima County Public Library named National Medal for Museum and Library Service Finalist; Opening of Idea+Space at Joel D. Valdez Main Library which offers workshops for small businesses, nonprofits, and entrepreneurs; Shelving improvements at Woods Memorial Library; Library Nurse Program receives the 2014 American Public Health Association's Lillian Wald Service Award.
2015	New Library website launched; Refresh of Mission Library, including expansion of the computer lab and addition of two study rooms; Seed Library hosts first International Seed Library Forum; Culture Pass, a partnership between the Library and the nonprofit organization Act One, debuts at eight libraries, making meaningful arts experiences accessible to all.; Two additional Bookbikes begin serving the communities surrounding Eckstrom-Columbus Library and Santa Rosa Library; 5th Annual MegaMania!! event is held at Pima Community College Downtown Campus, free and open to the public. This family-friendly celebration of all things comics, anime, cosplay, and art was inaugurated in 2011.
2016	Opening of 101Space at Joel D. Valdez Main Library, a dedicated environment for teens based on the principles of Connected Learning; Janni Lee Simner and Adrienne Celt serve as Library's first Writers-in-Residence, a program sponsored by the Arizona State Library, a division of the Secretary of State, with federal funds from the Institute of Museum and Library Services.; Refresh of Miller-Golf Links Library, including new carpet, a new service desk, new upholstery, and an expansion of public computers; Refresh of Martha Cooper Library, including a new service desk and book drop; Arizona Daily Star readers choose the Library as Best Adult Education Enrichment Classes (Favorite) and Best Arts/Cultural Education Programs (Winner) in the annual Readers' Choice Awards.; Amber Mathewson appointed as Interim Library Director; Launch of Career Online High School
2017	Geasa-Marana Library closes, building transferred to Marana Unified School District; Oro Valley Public Library's 101Space opens; Selected as one of three public libraries nationwide to launch DigitalLearn in collaboration with Cox Communications and the American Library Association.; Amber Mathewson appointed as Library Director; Kirk-Bear Canyon Library receives new carpet; Upgrades, including new lighting, expanded parking, updated paint, and re-carpeting made at Joyner-Green Valley Library; Eckstrom-Columbus Library celebrates 40th anniversary; Flowing Wells Library closes to undergo major renovation and expansion led by the award-winning architecture firm Line and Space, LLC.; Sam Lena-South Tucson Library temporarily closes for overhaul to maximize square footage and transform layout; LGBTQ+ Services Committee hosts Todd Parr in the Park to celebrate its 20th anniversary
2018	Begins offering Kanopy, a video streaming service providing access to 30,000 movies; Continues its ongoing support of the Tucson Festival of Books with abundant activities at the 10th anniversary event; Hosts free lecture with influential public intellectual Noam Chomsky at Joel D. Valdez Main Library; New shelving installed in the 14,000 square foot Joyner-Green Valley Library; New carpet installed in the 29,000 square foot Oro Valley Public Library; Wheeler Taft Abbett Sr. Library celebrates its 10th anniversary; Himmel Park Library receives ADA compliant restroom; Children's Room at Joel D. Valdez Main Library closes temporarily for LSTA grant-funded renovations, including the creation of an early literacy center and a tween space.; Murphy-Wilmot Library, Eckstrom-Columbus Library, Wheeler Taft Abbett Sr. Library, and Martha Cooper Library selected by Pima County Office of Sustainability and Conservation to incorporate solar panels in parking lots.; Begins offering access to three additional video streaming platforms – Acorn TV, Qello Concerts, and Pongalo
2019	Ready, Set, School! program launches to prepare 4-5yr olds and their families for school; Kindred Team begins One Book, One Community program; Harry and the Potters played at the Flowing Wells Library for their 2019 Summer Tour; Construction of the Esmond Station Library begins; Many Nations Team launches Library Night Out at Old Pascua; Quincie Douglas Library and Woods Library temporarily close for remodels
2020	Library locations temporarily close for normal business on March 17 based on CDC guidance in response to COVID-19; Infoline services remain open during this time; Most library locations re-open with a Limited Service model on May 18; allowing holds pick-up, computer use, and print/copy/fax services.; Begins offering eCard, a library card that can be signed up for and received through the website
2021	January 11: Libraries reopen after December pandemic closure.; February 16: W. Anne Gibson-Esmond Station Library opens in Vail, AZ.; March 16: El Pueblo Library renamed Frank De La Cruz-El Pueblo Library in honor of its first librarian.; April 19: Muralist Joe Pagac paints huge mural at Kirk-Bear Canyon Library.; May 13: Summer Learning launches with an event featuring author and meditation guide Rebekah Borucki.; June 1: Marge Pellegrino serves as the Library's 12th Writer in Residence.; July 8: Community members begin enjoying Storyline, an over-the-phone storytelling service.; September 7: The new Sahuarita Library at 670 W. Sahuarita Road opens to the public.; October 16: Award-winning author Lydia R. Otero headlines the annual LGBTQ+ Services Committee Author Talk
2022	November 20: Martha Cooper Library temporarily closes for library expansion.
2023	February: Buffalo Soldiers special collection launches at Quincie Douglas Library.
2024	September 17: Martha Cooper Library reopens after library renovation.

== Library directors ==
Year	Director
1887–1896	Nellie Pomeroy, Librarian
1896–1918	Jennie H. Batte, Librarian
1918–1946	Mary D. Breathitt, Librarian
1946–1962	Gertrude E. Burt, Head Librarian
1962–1968	John F. Anderson, Library Director
1968–1972	Frank Van Zanten, Library Director
1973	Elizabeth Ohm, Acting Director
1973–1982	John F. Anderson, Library Director
1982–1991	Marcia King, Library Director
1991–1996	Liz R. Miller, Library Director
1997–2003	Agnes M. Griffen, Library Director
2003–2005	Betsy Stunz-Hall, Library Director
2005–2012	Nancy Ledeboer, Director
2012–2016	Melinda Cervantes, Library Director
2016	Amber Mathewson, Interim Director
2017–2025	Amber Mathewson, Library Director
2025–	Tess Mayer, Library Director

== Libraries ==
- Joel D. Valdez Main Library
- Caviglia-Arivaca Library
- Dewhirst-Catalina Library
- Dusenberry-River Library
- Eckstrom-Columbus Library
- El Rio Library
- Flowing Wells Library
- Frank De La Cruz-El Pueblo Library
- Himmel Library
- Joyner-Green Valley Library
- Kirk-Bear Canyon Library
- Martha Cooper Library
- Miller-Golf Links Library
- Murphy-Wilmot Library
- Nanini Library (Casas Adobes, unincorporated area)
- Oro Valley Public Library
- Quincie Douglas Library
- Richard Elías-Mission Library
- Sahuarita Library
- Salazar-Ajo Library
- Sam Lena-South Tucson Library
- Santa Rosa Library
- Southwest Library
- Valencia Library
- W. Anne Gibson-Esmond Station Library
- Wheeler Taft Abbett Sr. Library
- Woods Memorial Library
- Permanently closed: Geasa-Marana Library (This location closed permanently on 1/27/17)

== Sources ==
- "History," "Timeline" and "Library Directors." Pima County Public Library website, 12-5-2012
- "City library director plans to resign, cites burnout." Arizona Daily Star. June 19, 1991
- "Councilmen rechristen the library." Arizona Daily Star. January 8, 1957. Page B1 and Staff notes.
- "County settle two lawsuits, buys flood-damaged home." Arizona Daily Star. November 15, 2006.
- David Leighton, "Street Smarts: Books a hot commodity in early Tucson," Arizona Daily Star, July 8, 2014
