= Will Inman (poet) =

American poet

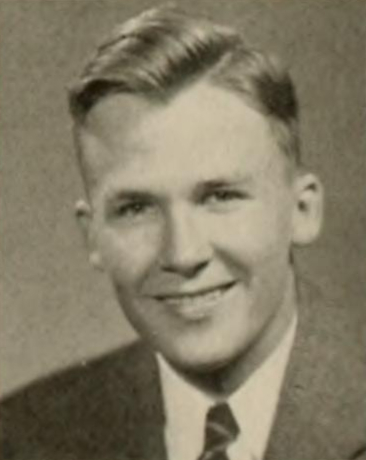
- Inman in the Duke University yearbook, 1943
- Born: William Archibald McGirt, Jr. 4 May 1923; Wilmington, North Carolina, U.S.
- Died: 3 October 2009 (aged 86); Tucson, Arizona, U.S.
- Education: Duke University (1943)
- Occupation: Poet

Will Inman (born William Archibald McGirt Jr.; May 4, 1923 – October 3, 2009) was born in Wilmington, North Carolina, and graduated from Duke University in 1943. He took his mother's maiden name, Inman, in part because his name became "Will In Man". He worked in a shipyard during World War II, and became an activist in 1947 after summers of work in the Blue Ridge Mountains where Inman attempted, unsuccessfully, to organize tobacco industry workers.

Like many in the American left, he joined the Communist party, but became disillusioned with its lack of humanity and left the organization. He was called before the House Un-American Activities Committee in 1956 where he was accused of being the head of the Communist Party in North Carolina. Inman pleaded the fifth in response to all questions. Attempting to begin life anew, he moved to New York City, working in libraries while focusing on writing in his free time.

From 1964 to 1977 he edited and published the seminal poetry newsletter Kauri, part of the Mimeo Revolution of the Sixties, where he published the work of Charles Bukowski, Clarence Major, Walter Lowenfels, William Packard, Ron Silliman, John Sinclair. The title, Kauri, is the Hindi word for the seashell known to English speaking peoples as a cowrie shell. In 1967 he was appointed Poet-in-Residence at American University, teaching there and at Montgomery College in Rockville, Maryland. He has also been an activist for many humanist causes including anti-war and gay rights efforts.

Inman moved to Tucson, Arizona in 1973. His anthology Fired Up with You: Poems of a Niagara Vision was one of the earliest anthologies to include the poetry of Jimmy Santiago Baca as well as the pioneering feminist writer Barbara Mor. He completed a memoir in 1998 but Red Crane Books decided not to publish it, possibly related to concerns raised in a 1999 review in Publishers Weekly. A copy of his memoir has been donated to the Rubenstein Rare Book Library at Duke University.

Inman died in 2009 after suffering from Parkinson's disease.

His letters, manuscripts, and publications are collected at Duke University and at the University of North Carolina Wilmington.

== Selected bibliography ==
- Surfings: Selected Poems (Howling Dog Press, 2005)Jimmy Santiago Baca
- Leaps of Hope and Fury (ed. David Ray, Pudding Press, 2008)
- I READ YOU GREEN, MOTHER (Howling Dog Press, 2008)
- Surfing the Dark Sound (Pudding House Publications, 1998)
- 108 Verges Until Now (Carlton Press, 1964)
- Fired Up with You: Poems of a Niagara Vision (Border Publishing Co, 1977)
