= List of lesbian feminist organizations =

A list of notable lesbian feminist organizations.

== Asia and the Middle East ==
=== Israel ===
- Kehila Lesbit Feministit/Community of Lesbian Feminists (KLaF/CLAF) – a lesbian feminist organization that published the quarterly periodical Klaf Hazak.

=== Thailand ===
- Anjaree – a lesbian feminist and later LGBT organization formed in 1986, defunct by 2011.

== Europe ==
=== Denmark ===
- Lesbian Movement (Danish: Lesbisk Bevægelse) - a lesbian feminist organization founded in Copenhagen and active between 1974 and 1985.

=== France ===
- Gouines rouges (Red Dykes) - a radical lesbian feminist movement active in the 1970s.

=== The Netherlands ===
- Lesbian Nation (organisation), lesbian feminist activist group, 1976 until the mid-1980s

=== United Kingdom ===
- Leeds Revolutionary Feminist Group - a radical lesbian feminist organization active in Leeds, England in the 1970s and 1980s that promoted political lesbianism.
- Lesbians Against Pit Closures - a working-class socialist lesbian-feminist alliance that worked to support striking miners during the UK miners' strike (1984–85), formed by lesbian feminists originally affiliated with Lesbians and Gays Support the Miners.

== Oceania ==
=== New Zealand ===
- Sisters for Homophile Equality - a lesbian feminist organization active in Christchurch and Wellington in the 1970s and 1980s that published the journal Lesbian Feminist Circle.

== South America ==
=== Bolivia ===
- Mujeres Creando, a Bolivian anarcha-feminist lesbian collective.

== North America ==
=== Canada ===
- Lesbian Organization of Toronto - the first lesbian feminist organization in Canada.

=== Mexico ===
- Lesbos - a lesbian feminist organization founded in 1977.
- Oikabeth (Mujeres guerreras que abren caminos y esparcen flores) - a lesbian separatist organization founded in 1977.
- Van Dykes, an itinerant band of lesbian separatists who lived and traveled in vans throughout the United States and Mexico.

=== United States ===
- AMASONG - a lesbian feminist amateur choir based in Champaign–Urbana, Illinois.
- Amazon Bookstore Cooperative - the first lesbian/feminist bookstore in the United States, located in Minneapolis, Minnesota, from 1970 to 2012.
- Artemis Singers - a lesbian feminist chorus based in Chicago, Illinois.
- Atlanta Lesbian Feminist Alliance - a lesbian feminist organization in Atlanta, Georgia.
- Camp Sister Spirit - a former lesbian feminist retreat in Ovett, Mississippi
- Combahee River Collective - a black lesbian feminist socialist organization in Boston, Massachusetts from 1974 to 1980 that coined the term identity politics.
- Daughters of Bilitis - first lesbian civil and political rights organization in the United States.
- The Feminists - a radical feminist group active in New York City from 1968 to 1973 that promoted political lesbianism and later matriarchy.
- The Furies Collective - a lesbian separatist commune active in Washington, D.C. from 1971 to 1972.
- Latina lesbian organizations in the United States - a collection of organizations based out of the intersectionality of being lesbian identifying Latina's in the United States
- Lavender Menace - an informal group of lesbian radical feminists formed to protest the exclusion of lesbians and lesbian issues from the feminist movement.
- Lesbian Art Project - a participatory lesbian-feminist art movement at the Woman's Building in Los Angeles.
- Lesbian Avengers - a lesbian feminist organization founded in New York City in 1992, most notable for creating the Dyke March.
- Lesbian Feminist Liberation - a feminist lesbian rights advocacy organization in New York City formed in 1972.
- Lincoln Legion of Lesbians - a lesbian feminist collective in Lincoln, Nebraska, that supported lesbian rights, separatism, and women-only spaces.
- Oregon Women's Land Trust - a 501(c)(3) membership organization that holds land for conservation and educational purposes in the state of Oregon as part of the womyn's land movement.
- Salsa Soul Sisters - a lesbian feminist and lesbian womanist collective of Black lesbians and other lesbians of color that is the oldest Black lesbian organization in the United States.
- Van Dykes, an itinerant band of lesbian separatists who lived and traveled in vans throughout the United States and Mexico.
- Women's Liberation Center, a former fire station used as a space for multiple lesbian feminist organizations.

== See also ==
- Lesbian feminism
- Lesbian organizations
- Lesbian separatism
- List of LGBT-related organizations
