= Monica Sjöö =

Swedish painter, writer and anarcho/eco-feminist

- Born: 31 December 1938; Härnösand, Västernorrland, Sweden
- Died: 8 August 2005 (aged 66); Bristol, England
- Occupations: Painter, writer, radical anarcho/eco-feminist
- Notable work: God Giving Birth (1968, oil), The Great Cosmic Mother with Barbara Mor (1987)
- Movement: Anarchism; Ecofeminism; Feminist art movement Goddess movement Women's liberation movement
- Spouses: Stevan Trickey; Andrew Jubb
- Children: 3

God Giving Birth (1968, oil)

Monica Sjöö (31 December 1938 – 8 August 2005) was a Swedish-born British-based painter, writer and radical anarcho/eco-feminist and peace activist who was an early exponent of the Goddess movement. Her books and paintings were foundational to the development of feminist art in Britain, beginning at the time of the founding of the women's liberation movement around 1970.

Sjöö's most famous painting is God Giving Birth (1968), which depicts a woman giving birth and was inspired by Sjöö's religious view of motherhood; it sparked some protests from Christian groups in the 1970s. She wrote or co-wrote the manifesto Towards a Revolutionary Feminist Art (1971) and The Great Cosmic Mother: Rediscovering the Religion of the Earth (1987).

Sjöö's art and writing became well-known outside of the UK, and throughout the 1970s, 1980s and 1990s she corresponded with influential American writers, artists and pagans such as Jean and Ruth Mountaingrove, Starhawk, Zsuzsanna Budapest, Shekhinah Mountainwater, Lucy Lippard, Alice Walker, and Judy Chicago.

== Early life ==
Her parents were the Swedish painters Gustaf Arvid Sjöö (1902–1949) and Anna Harriet Rosander-Sjöö (1912–1965), who divorced when Sjöö was three years old. She left school and ran away from home when she was 16.

Sjöö traveled Europe and held a variety of jobs: she worked in vineyards and as a nude model at art schools in Paris and Rome. She first visited Britain in the late 1950s, and eventually settled in Bristol where – except for a period in Wales in the early 1980s – she lived for the rest of her life. She participated in the August 1981 march from Cardiff to Newbury, Berkshire in opposition to the siting of US cruise missiles at RAF Greenham Common and became a member of the Greenham Common Women's Peace Camp. She was one of the promoters of the idea that it should be a women-only camp.

== Career ==
The cover of The Great Cosmic Mother (1987). It features Sjöö's painting Diana The Moon (1976).

Sjöö was the main author of Towards a Revolutionary Feminist Art (1971) one of the first, and most militant, feminist art manifestos. It was discussed widely in the feminist press, and The Guardian published an article in response.

Sjöö wrote the original pamphlet that, with Barbara Mor's re-write and expansion, would become the book The Great Cosmic Mother (1987). It covers women's ancient history and the origin of religion, and is one of the first books to propose that humanity's earliest religious and cultural belief systems were created and first practised by women. It is currently in print and has been, and still is, a part of many women's studies, mythology and religious studies syllabi. Her research and writing helped uncover the hidden history of the Goddess. Sjöö's successful use of interdisciplinarity in her research has led to its acclaim within the Goddess movement.

=== Early exhibitions ===
Sjöö's first exhibition was at the Gallery Karlsson in Stockholm, Sweden in 1967. Having been a founder member of the Bristol Women's Liberation group, in March 1971, she participated in the first "Women's Liberation Art Group" exhibition held at the Woodstock Gallery in London.

Margaret Harrison (1977) states that [on one occasion in 1970 several of Sjöö's paintings were banned from being shown in St. Ives during the St. Ives festival]. (...) "Monica then wrote in Socialist Woman (Nottingham) proposing forming a group or alliance of women artists. This led to the formation of the Bristol Women's Art Group (...)".

=== Later exhibitions ===
Sjöö used imagery in her paintings which often references birth, the female body, and nature. All of these images were central to her beliefs regarding her "Cosmic Mother". She described herself as among the pioneers in this movement of reclaiming female divinity – along with many other writers, artists, poets, and thinkers. In her art, she attempted to "holistically express" her growing religious belief in the Great Mother as the cosmic spirit and generative force in the universe. This was a critical component of her artwork. She claimed to enter a "state" of being or of mind where knowledge was available from past, present, and future.

Sjöö's most famous painting, God Giving Birth (1968), depicts a woman giving birth, and has the title text painted in red capitalized letters. It is an expression of Sjöö's spiritual journey at that time, inspired by her religious experience during the birth of her second son, and represents her perception of the Great Mother as the universal creator of cosmic life. The painting and its concept created some controversy among Christian groups in the 1970s; at a group exhibition in London in 1973, it led to Sjöö being reported to the police for blasphemy, although the case was not taken up by the court.

== Beliefs ==
Sjöö's work and beliefs centered on her respect and care of the Goddess, or Mother Earth. The Goddess was "the beauty of the green earth, the life-giving waters, the consuming fires, the radiant moon, and the fiery sun". Sjöö's respect for nature and the environment was not mere belief but, for her, a spiritual truth. The Goddess / Earth is to be respected as the life giver. This respect is to be found not only in her imagery, but in two texts which chronicle her journey through the written word.

Yet, these abstract beliefs were grounded with a firm foundation of action and activism. She was involved with the anarchist and anti-Vietnam War movements in Sweden in the 1960s and was active in the women's movement in Britain. Her political activism always grew out of her spiritual understanding of the earth as our living mother, similar to the beliefs of some Native American peoples.

Sjöö was highly critical of many of the ideas and personages of the New Age movement, including Alice Bailey, J. Z. Knight and "Ramtha", and Gene Roddenberry for some of the ideas behind Star Trek.

== Reception ==
Starhawk described Sjöö's work as paintings that "transformed ancient images and symbols into contemporary icons of female power." In 1976 Sjöö was the subject of a film documentary shown at the ICA and NFT.

== Personal life ==
Sjöö believed heterosexuality was an unnatural state imposed by patriarchy, and later in her life she enjoyed a number of intimate romantic relationships with women. (In the context of the 1980 essay by Adrienne Rich, "Compulsory Heterosexuality and Lesbian Existence".) However, after separating from her second husband, Andy Jubb, a composer, in the mid 1970s, Sjöö had an intense relationship with Keith Paton, a founder of the Alternative Socialist movement and, like Sjöö herself, a regular contributor to the alternative press, especially Peace News. Under Sjöö's influence, Paton changed his name to Motherson (or Mothersson).

Two of her three sons died young. In 1985 her youngest, Leify, was killed in front of her by an oncoming car at age 15. Her eldest son, Sean, died of non-Hodgkin's lymphoma in 1987, aged 28. She claimed that his death was exacerbated by his experiences of rebirthing. Sjöö's grief at this double loss led first to an artistic paralysis akin to writer's block, and then to artistic expression, in the shape of the painting My Sons in the Spirit World (1989).

Sjöö died of cancer in 2005, aged 66.

== Artwork ==
=== Exhibitions ===
Group exhibitions
Name	Year	Venue
Nine Morgens	2003	Glastonbury Goddess Conference
Windows to Otherworlds	2002	St Petersburgh State University, Russia
Neolithia Arts Festival	2001–2002	Gozo, Malta and (Germany)
II Mara II	1999	Dragonara Hotel, St. Julian's, Malta
Malta and Beyond	1998	Quan Yin Gallery, Oakland, California, US
"Hjartat sitter till vanster" (Heart is on the Left) radical art in Scandinavia from 1965 to 1975	1998	Various in Scandinavia
North Current	1998	Varberg Museum, Sweden; Watermans Arts Centre, London, England; Gedok-Haus, Lubeck, Germany
Sharjah Biennial	1997	United Arab Emirates
With Your Own Face On	1994–1995	Various in England
Fantasy: Exchange exhibition with Arab women artists	1994	Various is UAE
The Stones and the Goddess	1990	Gaia Book Store Gallery, Berkeley, California
Women Artists in Wales	1984–1985	Llandudno, Aberystwyth Arts Centre and Newport Arts Museum, Wales
Woman Magic: Celebrating the Goddess Within Us	1979–1980	Various in Europe
The Worlds as We See It	1977	Swiss Cottage Library, London
Kvinnfolk (Womenpeople)	1975	Kulturhuset, Stockholm, Sweden and Malmo Arts Hall
Women's Lives	1974-1974	Various in Scandinavia
Images of Womanpower	1973	Swiss Cottage Library, London
Women's Liberation Art Group	1971	Woodstock Gallery, London

Solo exhibitions
Name	Year	Location
Monica Sjöö: The time is NOW and it is overdue!	2022	Beaconsfield Gallery, Lambeth, London
	2001	Create Gallery, Bristol, England
	2001	Skellefta Women's Arts Museum, Sweden
	2001	Kebele Kulture Projekt, Bristol, England
Traveling Show	1999–2000	Casa de Colores at Brownsville, Texas, USA; Austin, Texas; University of Texas in Arlington
	1998	Gaia Centre Galleri, Stockholm, Sweden
Touring Exhibition	1994	Various in Scandinavia
Women's Rites	1994	Liverpool, England
	1967	Galleri Karlsson, Stockholm

=== Locations ===
Sjöö's art can be found in the Women's Art Collection at Murray Edwards College in Cambridge and at the Museum Anna Nordlander in Skellefteå, Sweden. Some of her works are currently held in private collections of individuals: Sig Lonegren, Alice Walker, and Genevieve Vaughan hold a few, while Maggie Parks holds most of her art. The Temple of Goddess Spirituality dedicated to Sekhmet holds Solar Lionheaded Sekhment of Primordial Fire (1992, oil on hardboard) where it is displayed in the living room of their guest house.

== Written works ==
=== The Great Cosmic Mother ===
- Sjöö, Monica (1975). The Ancient Religion of the Great Cosmic Mother of All. Bristol, England: Monica Sjöö. (Original pamphlet)
- Sjöö, Monica (1977). Den Store Kosmiske Mor og Hennes Urgamle Religion (in Norwegian). Trondheim: Regnbuetrykk. ISBN 9788272230011.
- ——; Mor, Barbara (1981). The Ancient Religion of the Great Cosmic Mother of All. Trondheim: Rainbow Press. ISBN 82-7223-012-7.
- ——; Mor, Barbara (1987). The Great Cosmic Mother: Rediscovering the Religion of the Earth. New York: HarperCollins Publishers Inc. ISBN 9780062507914.
- ——; Mor, Barbara (1991). The Great Cosmic Mother: Rediscovering the Religion of the Earth (2nd ed.). New York: HarperCollins Publishers Inc. pp. 501. ISBN 0062507915.
  - Excerpted in: Sjöö, Monica; Mor, Barbara (2016). "The First Sex: In The Beginning We Were All Female". In Barrett, Ruth (ed.). Female Erasure. Tidal Time. ISBN 978-0997146707.

=== Books ===
- Sjöö, Monica; Mothersson, Keith (1979). Women are the Real Left/Wider We: Towards Anarchist Politics. Matri/anarchy Press. ISBN 978-0950655109.
- —— (1 February 1992). New Age and Armageddon: The Goddess or the Gurus?. London: Women's Press. ISBN 9780704342637.
- —— (1999). Return of the Dark/Light Mother or New Age Armageddon: Towards a Feminist Vision of the Future. Austin, TX: Plain View Press. ISBN 9781891386077.
- —— (1 May 2000). The Norse Goddess. Meyn Mamvro Publications. ISBN 978-0-9518859-6-3.
- —— (2003). Kvinnligt konstnärligt skapande är mänskligt skapande: några kommentarer till Monica von Stedingk, "Kvinnokonstmuseum som ide" [Female Artistic Creation is Human Creation: Some Comments by Monica von Stedingk, "Women's Art Museum as an Idea"] (in Swedish). Museum Anna Nordlander. ISBN 9789186072315.

=== Chapters ===
- Sjöö, Monica (1972). "A Woman's Rights Over Her Body". In Wandor, Michelene (ed.). The Body Politic: Writings from the Women's Liberation Movement in Britain, 1969–1972. London: Stage 1. pp. 180–188. ISBN 9780850350142.
- —— (1983). "Aspects of the Great Mother" and "Creation". In Garcia, Jo; Maitland, Sara. Walking on the Water: Women Talk About Spirituality. London: Virago. ISBN 9780860683810
- ——; Smythe, Roslyn (1987). "Some Thoughts About Our Exhibition of 'Womanpower: Women's Art' at the Swiss Cottage Library". In Parker, Rozsika; Pollock, Griselda (eds.). Framing Feminism: Art and the Women's Movement, 1970–85. London: Pandora Press. ISBN 9780863581793.
- —— (1990). "Tested by the Dark/Light Mother of the Other-world". In Matthews, Caitlin (ed.). Voices of the Goddess: A Chorus of Sibyls. Aquarian Press. ISBN 9780850309652.
- ——; Straffon, Cheryl (1993). "Introduction". Pagan Cornwall: Land of the Goddess. Penzance, Cornwall: Meyn Mamvro. ISBN 9780951885925.
- —— (1995). "Monica Sjöö". In Witzling, Mara R. (ed.). Voicing Today's Visions: Writings by Contemporary Women Artists. London: Women's Press. ISBN 0704344335.
- —— (1996). "Well Worship: The Cult of Sacred Waters". In Castle, Leila (ed.). Earthwalking Skydancers: Women's Pilgrimages to Sacred Places. North Atlantic Books. ISBN 978-1883319335.

=== Articles ===
- Sjöö, Monica (1973). "För en revolutionär feministisk konst". Vi Människor (in Swedish). 25 (4): 22–26.
- —— (1977). "Women's Spirituality" (PDF). Goddess Shrew. Vol. 1. London: London Matriarchy Study Group. pp. 5–6.
- —— (1978). "Some Thoughts on Menstruation" (PDF). Menstrual Taboos. Vol. 2. London: London Matriarchy Study Group. pp. 11–13.
- —— (1979). "An Avebury Experience" (PDF). Politics of Matriarchy. Vol. 3. London: London Matriarchy Study Group. p. 55. ISBN 978-0906663004.
- —— (Fall 1980). "Art is a Revolutionary Act". WomanSpirit.
  - Excerpted in: (2001). In Robinson, Hilary. Feminism Art Theory: An Anthology 1968–2000. Malden, MA: Blackwell. ISBN 9780631208495.
  - (2015). In Robinson, Hilary. Feminism Art Theory: An Anthology 1968–2014. Malden, MA: Wiley Blackwell. ISBN 9781118360606.
- —— (1983). "Sagan om St. Göran och kvinnan". Hertha (in Swedish). 70 (2): 2–4, 38.
- —— (Summer 1984). "The Bleeding Yew Mother and Pentre Ifan Cromlech" (PDF). Wood and Water. 2 (12): 6–8. Archived from the original (PDF) on 10 January 2017.
- —— (1998). "Sinister New Age Channelings: Who or What is Speaking?". From the Flames – Radical Feminism with Spirit. 22. Archived from the original on 4 March 2016.
- ——. "The Unofficial Herstory of the Externsteine, Ancient Sacred Rocks of Germany". The Pipes of Pan. 19. Archived from the original on 14 March 2016.
- ——. "Challenging New Age Patriarchy". Women of Power (19). Archived from the original on 14 March 2016.
- —— (28 May 1993). "Going To Church: Breaking the Taboo – doing the unthinkable". Archived from the original on 14 March 2016.
- ——. "The Artist As Reluctant Shamanka". Archived from the original on 14 March 2016.
- ——. "St Non's Well, Pembrokeshire". Archived from the original on 14 March 2016.
- ——. "On Death and Dying". Archived from the original on 14 March 2016.

=== Poems ===
- Sjöö, Monica. "Nearly full Moon, Autumn Equinox 1986". Archived from the original on 14 March 2016.
- —— (12 September 1987). "New Age or Armegeddon". Archived from the original on 14 March 2016.
- ——. "Are There Great Female Beings Out There – Waiting for Us to be Free..." Archived from the original on 14 March 2016.

=== Pamphlets ===
- Sjöö, Monica; Berg, Anne (1971). Images on Womanpower – Art Manifesto (trying to get a rough and necessarily incomplete idea of what we are about). Bristol, England. Reprinted in "Towards a Revolutionary Feminist Art"
- ——; Berg, Anne; Moore, Liz (1972). Towards a Revolutionary Feminist Art. Bristol, England: Monica Sjöö.

== Bibliography ==
- The Great Cosmic Mother - Rediscovering the Religion of the Earth, co-authored with Barbara Mor, Harper & Row (1987)
- The Norse Goddess, Dor Dama Press, Meyn Mamvro Publications (2000)
- Return of the Dark/Light Mother or New Age Armageddon? – Towards a Feminist Vision of the Future, Plain View Press (1999)
- Spiral Journey, Antenna Publications (2019)
