= Barbara Mor =

American poet, editor, feminist

Barbara Mor (October 3, 1936 — January 24, 2015) was an American poet, editor, and Feminist of the twentieth-century Goddess movement. She became most widely known for The Great Cosmic Mother, a cross-disciplinary study that cites numerous archaeological, anthropological, historical and mythological texts and artifacts as evidence of women's role as creators and first practitioners of humanity's earliest religious and cultural belief systems. She was published by Athena Press, WomanSpirit, Second Porcupine Press, Harper & Row, and The Oliver Arts & Open Press. Her poetry was included in Fired Up with You : Poems of a Niagara Vision, edited by the poet Will inman (Border Press 1977)

== Beat origins ==
Attracted by the Beat Movement of the late 1950s and early 1960s, Mor lived and wrote in the Santa Cruz Mountains, Baja California, and Los Angeles before settling in San Diego to attend San Diego State University, where she became deeply involved with the Feminist Movement. She taught poetry, gave readings and lectures, and helped compile and edit a variety of poetry anthologies, as well as being Poetry Editor for WomanSpirit magazine.

== Early work ==
Mor spent the mid-1970s in Taos, New Mexico. During this period she wrote and published three volumes of poetry, Bitter Root Rituals in WomanSpirit 1975, Mother Tongue 1977, and Winter Ditch (Second Porcupine Press, 1982).

=== The Great Cosmic Mother ===
When Mor published The Great Cosmic Mother in 1987, the book met with immediate critical acclaim. It has never been out of print and remains on the curricula of many college and university Women's Studies and Mythology programs. It was considered an important reference books for students who studying ancient history and religion by the School Library Journal.

Mor's original and preferred title for the book was 'The First God', but her choice was over-ruled by publisher Harper & Row. The book began as a short pamphlet written in the 1970s by Monica Sjöö, a Swedish artist, writer, and feminist. Mor and Sjöö, having learned of one another through WomanSpirit magazine, collaborated in expanding the pamphlet to an 80-page small book, which was published by Rainbow Press, in Trondheim, Norway, in 1981. However, after this time Mor dedicated herself, independently, to research, extend, deepen, and expand the book to its present heft of almost 500 pages, this being the volume that was published in 1987 by Harper & Row. Said the publisher at that time, "For this American edition, the book has been completely rewritten and updated by Barbara Mor."

Mor's comprehensive analysis of world mythologies traces the origin of ancient spiritual beliefs, ceremonies, and rituals as related to Women. She argues that the goddess-centered beliefs that dated from humanity's Paleolithic age were violently destroyed and replaced by war-like patriarchal cultures and religions during the rise of agriculture and the erection of the first cities in Sumeria and elsewhere. With the displacement of matriarchy by patriarchy, the foundations of "modernity" were laid down, helping explain the rise of war, the manifestation of the Inquisition, and even the Salem witchcraft trials.

With royalties for The Great Cosmic Mother late in coming, Mor attempted to parley the success of the book into a teaching position, but ultimately could not find even menial work and ended up destitute and homeless for several years. She moved to Portland, Oregon in the 1990s, but her experience of homelessness and poverty in the American southwest even as The Great Cosmic Mother was being taught in colleges throughout the country provided much of the material for her next and last two books The Blue Rental and The Victory of Sex and Metal.

== Later work ==
=== The Blue Rental ===
Mor's years as a self-described "bag lady" in the southwest provide the scenery and thematic backdrop to her collection of prose-pieces, The Blue Rental (The Oliver Arts & Open Press, 2011). Most of the narratives included in The Blue Rental take place in Arizona and New Mexico and focus on poverty, violence – particularly against women – and trying to survive in a culture hostile to both poverty and women.

=== The Victory of Sex & Metal ===
Mor's last finished work, a 60-page long-poem, was posthumously published by The Oliver Arts & Open Press in October, 2015. The poem takes place in an impoverished urban region of the American Southwest and examines the bleak psychological and external and physical landscapes of a destitute young woman and her male partner living hard lives in the ruthless and unforgiving environment of a modern American city.
