= June Chan =

American lesbian activist and biologist

- Born: June 6, 1956 (age 70); Manhattan, New York City, New York, United States
- Occupations: Activist, biologist
- Spouse: Mariana Romo-Carmona

June Chan (born June 6, 1956) is an American lesbian activist and biologist. As the organizer and co-founder of the Asian Lesbians of the East Coast (ALOEC), Chan raised awareness for LGBTQ issues relating to the Asian American community.

== Biography ==
Chan was born on June 6, 1956, in Lower Manhattan to parents who worked in New York City's Chinatown. Chan's mother was a refugee from the Japanese invasion of China. Chan attended the Bronx High School of Science and graduated in 1973. She went on to earn her bachelor's degree in biology at the City College of New York in 1977. Chan earned her master's degree in biology from the State University of New York at Buffalo. After graduate school, she came out to her family, which was a mostly positive experience. Chan also works in research on neurobiology.

Chan and Katherine Hall met in 1983 and began working on projects together. They created a slide show of Asian lesbians in history and literature which was presented in the 1980s. Their slide show was considered "grassroots scholarship" by Polly Thistlethwaite.

Also in 1983, Chan and Hall formed the Asian Lesbians of the East Coast (ALOEC) in response to the overly white and male demographics of the LGBT community at the time. ALOEC conducted workshops and published newsletters. ALOEC took part in the Second National March on Washington for Lesbian and Gay Rights. During the process of organizing the march, Chan connected with other Asian-American lesbian groups. These groups and ALOEC formed the Asian Pacific Lesbian Network (later called the Asian Pacific Bi-Sexual Lesbian Network). In 1994, ALOEC participated in the 25th commemoration of the Stonewall riots.
