= God Giving Birth =

Painting by Monica Sjöö

- Artist: Monica Sjöö
- Year: 1968
- Medium: Oil on panel
- Dimensions: 185 cm × 125 cm (73 in × 49 in)
- Location: Museum Anna Nordlander, Skellefteå, Sweden

God Giving Birth is a 1968 painting by the Swedish artist Monica Sjöö. It shows a nude woman whose face is half dark and half light, with the head of a child emerging from her birth canal. Sjöö was an exponent of second-wave feminism and the Goddess movement. During the birth of her second son, she had inner visions that made her view motherhood in a religious light, and this inspired her to paint God Giving Birth.

First exhibited in the United Kingdom in 1970 and 1973, God Giving Birth drew criticism from Christian groups, who accused it of blasphemy. It has been discussed by modern pagans as a religious image and among feminist scholars for its way of connecting spiritual and physical creation. It is in the collection of the Museum Anna Nordlander in Skellefteå, Sweden.

== Background ==
Monica Sjöö (1938–2005) was a Swedish painter, writer, and political activist who lived most of her life in Bristol in the United Kingdom. She was involved in the women's liberation movement and spent three months in the United States in the summer of 1968 when she became a part of the emerging second-wave feminism. Back in Britain, she kept contact with the New York feminist Beila Cohen, who sent updates and material from groups such as W. I. T. C. H. Sjöö became an early exponent of the Goddess movement, where she practiced a woman-centred form of modern paganism. Her diary from 1968 lists books she recently had read by authors such as Margaret Murray, Robert Graves and Helena Blavatsky, along with a biography of Aleister Crowley.

The most common names or images of God in Sjöö's religious texts are the "Great Mother" and "Mother Earth". In her writings, she frequently used childbirth as a metaphor for creation. The painting God Giving Birth was started just before she left for the United States and completed soon after her return to Britain on 21 September 1968. It was inspired by the birth of her second son, an event she described in several texts as both physically and spiritually transforming. She wrote on her website:

For the first time I experienced the enormous power of my woman's body, both painful and cosmic and I "saw" in my mind's eye great luminous masses of blackness and masses of radiant light coming and going. The Goddess of the universe in her pure energy body. This birth changed my life and set me questioning the patriarchal culture we live in and its religions that deny the life-creating powers of the mothers and the Great Mother.

== Subject and composition ==
God Giving Birth is painted in oil on masonite panel and has the dimensions 185 cm × 125 cm (73 in × 49 in). The picture is filled by the frontal view of a stylised, nude, and bald woman. The woman's body and the left side of her face are light, but the right side is dark. Her hands are on her spread thighs, and the head of a child emerges from her birth canal. The dark background shows four bright celestial objects on the level of the woman's head. Below her body, between her shins, is the top of a dark sphere, and above it, the text "God giving birth" is in capital letters.

== Analysis and reception ==
Sjöö said the word God is crucial, because if she had used Goddess, the figure "could have been passed off as one of many Goddesses and/or a fertility image, not as THE cosmic creative power I intended to express". Doreen Valiente was a central person in Wicca and befriended Sjöö in the 1980s. In her book The Rebirth of Witchcraft (1989), she called God Giving Birth "one of the most powerful images of the Mother Goddess to be seen in modern times". The art historian Andrew Hottle likens God Giving Birth to Cynthia Mailman's painting God (1978), which also portrays God as a nude woman, but distinguishes Sjöö's painting for its origin in Sjöö's dedication to the "Great Cosmic Mother".

According to the feminist art critic Amy Mullin, God Giving Birth is about the spiritual and physical creativity of women, and the way it depicts pregnancy contests "both the dichotomy between bodily and spiritual pregnancy and the priority given to the latter". Although positive to its apparent rejection of mind–body dualism, Mullin is critical of the painting for several reasons: the woman looks unaffected by pregnancy, the fact that she is God may mean that she has not been transformed or challenged like a mortal woman, and the painting seems to valorise pregnancy only for the child that is its end product. The gender studies scholar Magdalena Raivio says she sympathises with Mullin's concern about "spiritual pregnancy", which tends to prioritise male creativity by de-emphasising the physicality of women's bodies, but she challenges Mullin's concerns about God Giving Birth by placing it in a "spiritual ecofeminist" context. Within this context, a central project is the "resacralization of the natural world", and Raivio interprets God Giving Birth as "a metaphor for a socially transforming physical and sacred process or change".

== Provenance ==
God Giving Birth was first exhibited in 1970 at an art festival in St. Ives in Cornwall sponsored by the Arts Council of Great Britain. It was shown at the Swiss Cottage Library in London in 1973 as part of the show 5 Women Artists – images and Womanpower. Christian groups accused it of blasphemy during these exhibitions. It was reported for breaking the British blasphemy law, but the case was not taken up by the court. In 1993, Sjöö and the Bristol political-religious feminist group Ama Mawu carried a poster of God Giving Birth into the Bristol Cathedral during a Sunday mass, intended as an accusation against the Christian church for blaspheming the Mother Goddess.

The Museum Anna Nordlander in Skellefteå, Sweden, purchased God Giving Birth in 1994. The museum, which opened in 1995 and focuses on art by women, held a large retrospective of Sjöö's works to go along with the purchase. Sjöö donated more than 20 of her paintings to the museum over the next few years.

== See also ==
- Feminist theology
- Great Goddess hypothesis
