= White Hispanic and Latino Americans =

Racial category

Estadounidenses hispanos y latinos blancos

Total population
- 12,579,626 (white alone); 20.3% of all Hispanic and Latino Americans and 3.8% of the U.S. population 31,521,221 (white alone, castizos or in another multiracial combination, but with a predominantly european heritage); 50.8% of all Hispanic and Latino Americans and 9.6% of the U.S. population (2020)

Regions with significant populations
- Nationwide, concentrated in Southwest
- Texas: 3,024,768; 26.4% of Hispanics and Latinos; 10.4% of total population
- California: 2,581,535; 16.6% of Hispanics and Latinos; 6.5% of total population
- Florida: 1,322,458; 23.2% of Hispanics and Latinos; 6.1% of total population
- New Mexico: 305,985; 30.3% of Hispanics and Latinos; 14.5% of total population

Languages
- English, Spanish, Spanglish

Religion
- Roman Catholicism, sizeable Protestantism

Related ethnic groups
- White Latin Americans, White Americans, Hispanic and Latino Americans, Spanish Americans, Portuguese Americans, Italian Americans, French Americans, Romanian Americans

White Hispanic and Latino Americans, also called Euro-Hispanics, Euro-Latinos, White Hispanics, or White Latinos, are Americans who identify as white people of European descent with roots in Spain, Portugal or Latin America.

Based on the definitions created by the Office of Management and Budget and the US Census Bureau, the concepts of race and ethnicity are mutually independent. For the Census Bureau, ethnicity distinguishes between those who report ancestral origins in Latin America and Spain (Hispanic and Latino Americans), and those who do not (non-Hispanic Americans). From 1850 to 1920, Mexicans in the United States were generally classified as white by the U.S. census. In 1930, "Mexican" was officially added as a racial category on the United States census but was soon after removed due to political pressure from the Mexican consul general in New York, the Mexican ambassador in Washington, the Mexican government itself, Mexican Americans, and the League of United Latin American Citizens (LULAC) who protested the exclusion of mixed-race Latinos in comparison to White Latinos or Euro-Latinos from whiteness. In 1970, a 5 percent sample of the census was asked if their "origin or descent" was Mexican, Puerto Rican, Cuban, Central or South American, or Other Spanish. In 1980, the full population was asked about "Spanish/Hispanic origin or descent" identifying three nationalities ("Mexican, Mexican-American, Chicano"). Thereafter "Latino" was classified solely as an ethnicity separate from race. In 2000, the US Census Bureau allowed persons to check multiple race identifiers.

As of 2020, 62 million or 18.7% of residents of the United States of America identified as Hispanic or Latino of which 12.5 million or 20.3% self-identified as white alone.

== History ==
Some Euro-Latinos/White Latinos in the United States of America today are descended from original Spanish colonists who settled the so-called "internal provinces" and Louisiana of New Spain. As the United States expanded westward, it annexed lands with a long-established population of Spanish-speaking settlers, who were sometimes overwhelmingly or exclusively of white Spanish ancestry (cf. White Mexican). This group became known as Hispanos. Prior to incorporation into the United States of America (and briefly, into Independent Texas), Hispanos that were fully Spanish, (criollos) had enjoyed a privileged status in the society of New Spain and later in post-colonial Mexico. The vast majority of Hispanos however, were racially mestizo, and thus weren't always seen as white by U.S standards.

== Racial identity ==
Concepts of multiracial identity have existed in Latin America since the colonial era, originating in a Spanish caste system. During the 20th century, the concept of mestizaje, or 'blending', was adopted as a national identity by a number of Latin American countries in order to reduce racial conflict.

A 2014 Pew Research Center survey found that one-third of US Latinos identify as "mestizo", "mulatto", or another multiracial identity. Such identities often conflict with standard racial classifications in the United States: among Latino American adults surveyed by Pew Research who identified as multiracial, about 40% reported their race as "white" on standard race question as used on the US Census; 13% reported belonging to more than one race or "mixed race"; while about 20% chose "Latino" as their race.

== Demographics ==
The top 10 U.S. states with the largest White alone population.

White alone Hispanics by state (2020)
State	Population	% of state	% of all Hispanic pop.
Texas	3,024,768	10.4	26.4
California	2,581,535	6.5	16.6
Florida	1,322,458	6.1	23.2
New York	544,442	2.7	13.8
Arizona	505,790	7.1	23.1
Illinois	395,476	3.1	16.9
Colorado	322,264	5.6	25.5
New Mexico	305,985	14.5	30.3
New Jersey	295,899	3.2	14.8
Nevada	162,511	5.2	18.3

White Hispanics are widespread, with California and Texas being two states with some of the highest populations of Hispanics self identifying as white. West Virginia has the highest percentage of the Hispanic population identifying as White Hispanic with 34.2%. The commonwealth of Puerto Rico had a White population of 536,044 or 16.5% of all Hispanics with an additional 24,548 people who were white alone (but not Hispanic or Latino) representing 66.7% of all non-Hispanics.

White alone Hispanics by percent (2020)
State	Population	% of all Hispanics
West Virginia	11,915	34.2
Montana	15,206	33.6
Maine	8,777	33.0
Wyoming	18,710	31.7
New Mexico	305,985	30.3
Vermont	4,550	29.3
North Dakota	9,778	29.3
Alaska	13,634	27.4
Michigan	149,323	26.5
Texas	3,024,768	26.4

In the 2000 census, the responses that contained a race specified by the Office of Management and Budget and a race not specified by OMB, were reclassified to match the races that OMB had considered. In this way, 44.24% of the Hispanic population that had marked as white and another race not specified by the OMB was recategorized as only white.

White Hispanics as a population pyramid in 2020.

Hispanics and Latinos who are native-born and those who are immigrant identify as white in nearly identical percentages: 53.9 and 53.7, respectively, per figures from 2007. The overall Hispanic or Latino ratio was 53.8%.

In 2017, the Pew Research Center reported that high intermarriage rates and declining Latin American immigration has led to 11% of US adults with Hispanic ancestry (5.0 million people) to no longer identify as Hispanic. First generation immigrants from Spain & Latin America identify as Hispanic at very high rates (97%) which reduces in each succeeding generation, second generation (92%), third generation (77%), and fourth generation (50%).

== Population by national origin ==
2010 census
National origin	Self-identified white pop.	% who self-identified as white
Caribbean	4,400,071	56.2%
Puerto Rican	2,455,534	53
Cuban	1,525,521	85.4
Dominican	419,016	29.6
Central American	18,491,777	51.7%
Mexican	16,794,111	53
Salvadoran	663,224	47
Guatemalan	401,763	36.8
South American	1,825,468	65.9
All other Hispanic	2,018,397	50
Totals	26,735,713	53

Some Hispanic or Latino American groups that have white majorities or pluralities originate in countries that do not. For example, Mexico's white only population is 9% to 17%, while Mexico is majoritarily mestizo, meaning that they have mixed European and Native American ancestry, while 52.8% of Mexican Americans are white, or identify themselves as white in the Census (See the table). The differences in racial perceptions that exist in both countries are considered: the concept of race in Mexico is subtle not only including physical clues such as skin color but also cultural dispositions, morality, economic, and intellectual status. It is not static or well defined but rather is defined and redefined by the situation. This makes racial distinctions different from those in other countries such as the United States.

Other important differences lay in the criteria and formats used for the censuses in each country: In Mexico, the only ethnic census including categories other than Amerindian (dated back to 1921) performed by the government offered the following options in the questionnaire:

- Full European heritage
- Mixed Indigenous and European heritage (the term "mestizo" itself was never used by the government)
- Full Indigenous
- Foreigners without racial distinction
- Other race

The census had the particularity that, unlike racial/ethnic census in other countries, it was focused in the perception of cultural heritage rather than in a racial perception, leading to a good number of white people to identify with "Mixed heritage" due cultural influence. On the other hand, while only 2.9% of the population of the United States identifies as mixed race there is evidence that an accounting by genetic ancestry would produce a higher number, but historical and cultural reasons, including slavery creating a racial caste and the European-American suppression of Native Americans, often led people to identify or be classified by only one ethnicity, generally that of the culture they were raised in. While many Americans may be biologically multiracial, they often do not know it or do not identify so culturally.

== Representation in the media ==
Judith Ortiz Cofer noted that appellation varies according to geographical location, observing that in Puerto Rico she was considered white, but on the United States mainland she was considered a "brown person."

Since the early days of the movie industry in the United States of America, when white Hispanic actors are given roles, they are frequently cast in non-Hispanic white roles. Hispanic and Latino Americans began to appear in the American movie industry in the 1910s, and the leading players among them "were generally light skinned and Caucasian". White Hispanic and Latino Americans portraying Hispanic characters usually have olive skin, dark hair, and dark eyes.

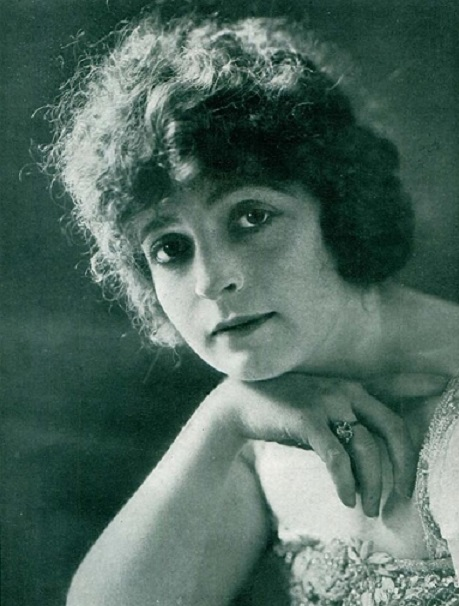
Myrtle Gonzalez was a silent actress and soprano of Mexican Californio descent in the early 20th century.

Myrtle Gonzalez was one such Mexican-American actress in the silent film era; she starred in at least 78 motion pictures from 1913 to 1917. In 1919, Photoplay Magazine honored Gonzalez with a Bronze Plaque for her exceptional performance in “The Mexican” which was considered one of her finest roles.

Anita Page was an American actress of Spanish descent who reached stardom in 1928, during the last years of the silent film. Page was referred to as "a blond, blue-eyed Latin". Hilary Swank an American actress and film producer recipient of numerous awards, including two Academy Awards and two Golden Globe Awards. Her maternal grandmother, Frances Martha Clough (née Dominguez), was born in El Centro, California, and was of Mexican descent.

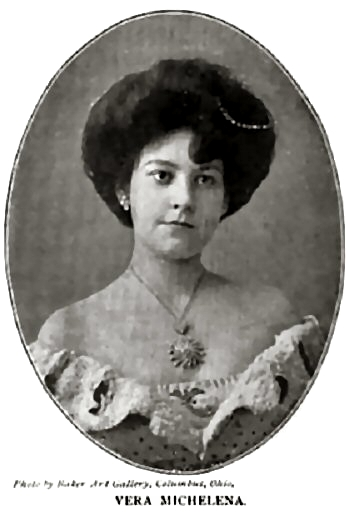
Vera Michelena was an actress of Spanish Venezuelan descent in the early 20th century.

Telenovelas (soap operas) have been criticized for not fully reflecting the racial diversity of Hispanic and Latino Americans, and for underrepresenting non-white Hispanic and Latino Americans, in favor of those that are of lighter complexion, blonde-haired and blue/green-eyed rather than the typical Hispanic and Latino Americans of olive skin complexion, dark-haired and brown-eyed.

White Hispanic/white Latino literature originating from the San Joaquin Valley revolves around the lives and stories of farmworkers. Meanwhile, the autobiographies of white stateside Puerto Ricans and the poetry of the Nuyorican Movement are most often about their socioeconomic concerns.

== Marriage trends ==
A total of 27% of Hispanics marry outside their ethnicity. Non-Hispanic white/Hispanic intermarriage is the most common intermarriage in the United States representing 42% of interethnic marriages compared to white/black at 11%. Intermarriage rates between whites and Hispanics do not differ significantly among the genders (with Hispanic females slightly more likely to marry whites).

== Genetics ==
Genetic research has found that the average non-European admixture is present in both white-Hispanics and non-Hispanic whites with different degrees according to different areas of the United States. Average European admixture among self-identified white Hispanic Americans is 73% (the average for Hispanic Americans regardless of race is 65.1%), contrasting to that of non-Hispanic European Americans, whose European ancestry totals 98.6% on average. "Average admixture," however, can be a misleading measure, as it conflates vastly different population groups and ignores marked differences within individual Latino groups. Each Latin American country has a unique demographic history, with significant diversity within each country as well, especially in larger countries. Mexican Americans and Central Americans are frequently of mestizo descent for instance, but Mexico has a significant white population, estimated at between 13 and 42 million (10%-32%) out of a total population of 130 million, making it home to the largest total white population in the Hispanic Americas alone, and the second largest in Latin America. In some Latin American countries, a majority of the population are white, including Cuba, where 64% of the population are white. Other Latin American countries with a high percentage of white Latin Americans include Uruguay and Argentina, where large majorities of the population are of European descent. In Uruguay, although the population is only 3 to 4 million, over 86% of the population are white according to the 2023 census, even higher than the percentage of white people in the United States or Canada.

The genetic profile of American Latinos varies from group to group and is a result of unique immigration histories. For instance, the Cuban exiles "fleeing the Castro regime in the 1960s and '70s were almost entirely white, educated and middle or upper class."

== Employment ==
Farmworkers in the country are disproportionately white Hispanic/white Latino. This is especially true in some areas, for example Southern Arizona. Many are producers, in other words they are farm operators. White Hispanics/white Latinos are a larger part of the Southern Arizona population than in the rest of the country, and are a large part of the area's agricultural workforce. However, racial classification in the United States usually requires tribal enrollment to identify one's race as native or indigenous. Brown Latinos are often automatically recorded as white if they aren't enrolled in a native tribe and if they don't have black ancestry.

== See also ==
- European Americans
- White Americans
- Non-Hispanic whites
- Spanish Americans
- Neomexicano
- Tejano
- List of Hispanic and Latino Americans
- Black Hispanic and Latino Americans
- Asian Hispanic and Latino Americans
- White Puerto Ricans
- Latina lesbian organizations in the United States
