= Naomi Littlebear Morena =

American musician and writer

- Born: Naomi Littlebear Morena; 1950 (age 75–76)
- Died: September 29, 2026; Portland, Oregon
- Occupations: Musician, writer

Naomi Littlebear Morena (born 1950) is a musician and writer most known for her work "You Can't Kill the Spirit," a feminist resistance anthem which was sung by over 30,000 women at the Greenham Common Women's Peace Camp in the 1980s. Izquierda Ensemble grew out of Ursa Minor, formed by Morena and Kristan Knapp, one of the first lesbian feminist choirs in the world. Morena was described as a self-taught artist who "emerged on her own brilliance" and a "hippie street person hitchhiking" between Los Angeles and Portland, Oregon by Knapp, a fellow member of the Izquierda Ensemble, which toured nationally in the 1970s. Morena also created "one of the first plays to feature a Chicana lesbian as a main character," first performed in 1980 and titled Survivor: A Lesbian Rock Opera. The play follows Clara, who "rejects the Anglo feminist community because it eradicates her lesbianism." Morena's work has been noted to be "currently out of print and rarely produced." Morena commented on Mudcat Café in 2012 that she wrote "You Can't Kill the Spirit" when she was in the Izquierda Ensemble in the 1970s and is "humbled by the stories I have heard regarding the singing of my song at the various protests, peace and healing gatherings through out the world."

== Bibliography ==
- "Dreams of violence" in This Bridge Called My Back (1981)
- "Earth-lover, survivor, musician" in This Bridge Called My Back (1981)
- "Noche Encantada" in Bearing Witness Sobreviviendo: An Anthology of Writing and Art by Native American/Latina Women (1986)
- "Coming Out Queer and Brown" in For Lesbians Only: A Separatist Anthology (1988)
