= Ruth Mountaingrove =

American photographer, poet, musician (1923 - 2016)

- Self portrait of Ruth Mountaingrove
- Born: Ruth Shook; February 21, 1923; Philadelphia, Pennsylvania, U.S.
- Died: December 18, 2016 (aged 93); Eureka, California, U.S.
- Education: Kutztown State Teacher's College, B.S., 1945; Humboldt State University, M.A. Art and Photography, 1990; M.A. Theatre Production and Dramatic Writing, 2002
- Known for: WomanSpirit; The Blatant Image; Turned On Woman Songbook; For Those Who Cannot Sleep
- Spouses: Bern Ikeler; Jean Mountaingrove

Ruth Mountaingrove (February 21, 1923 – December 18, 2016) was an American radical lesbian feminist photographer, poet and musician, known for her photography documenting the lesbian land movement in Southern Oregon.

== Early life and education ==
She was born Ruth Shook on February 21, 1923, in Philadelphia, Pennsylvania, to Edith Shelling and Herbert Daniel Shook. She earned a Bachelor of Science in Education degree from Kutztown State Teacher's College in 1945, majoring in science with minors in English and Spanish. In 1946, she published a book of poems, Rhythms of Spring, and married Bern Ikeler. After nineteen years of marriage and five children, they divorced in 1965. Mountaingrove joined the Philadelphia chapter of NOW in 1966, and worked to change abortion laws. She helped found Women in Transition by writing for the newspaper, assisting battered women, and helped facilitate the first lesbian group in the city.

== WomanSpirit magazine ==
She met her future partner Jean in 1970. When she met Jean, realized that she is a lesbian, and started to make a living with writing for a magazine, Country Women, and newspaper, the Women’s Press, in Eugene, Oregon. Because of being lesbians, she and Jean were expelled from their Mountain Grove home. Country Women supported their search for a place to settle around the West Coast. In 1971 they moved to Southern Oregon, taking the name of the intentional community where they lived for two years, Mountain Grove. They moved to Golden, Oregon, which was a gay commune and founded WomanSpirit, a lesbian feminist quarterly published collectively near Wolf Creek, Oregon, from 1974 to 1984. The magazine was established, inspired by the experience of writing for Country Women. It was the first American lesbian/feminist periodical to be dedicated to both feminism and spirituality. Their vision for the magazine was "international and radical feminist. We wanted a cultural revolution—a total reordering of institutions and values. It was to be a modest magazine with grand goals." One of the goals is "to validate that it's okay to be wherever you are in your own development". Ruth and Jean wanted all women to feel having many other people who shares the same spirit and experiences. The contents of this magazine are pliable as they are what readers supplied and dealt with by anyone who could help at that time, so that the magazine's spirituality is not firm.

== Oregon Women's Land Trust ==
In the spirit of removing "man" and "men" from her descriptions of her work, Mountaingrove and Tee Corinne led "ovular" photography workshops instead of "seminars" on photography, where "women could learn photography in the context of the women's movement, providing a means for the women to examine the differences between the way men pictured women and the way the women saw themselves." The Blatant Image (a feminist photography magazine) grew out of the ovular workshops.

Ruth took the pictures included in the materials Phillis Lyon and Del Martin collected for their magazine called Lesbian Love and Liberation (1973).

Oregon Women's Land Trust Meeting 1970 by Ruth Mountaingrove

The Mountaingroves purchased land in 1978, called Rootworks, where Ruth Mountaingrove published the book Turned on Woman's Songbook and a book of poetry, For Those Who Cannot Sleep. Between 1974 and 1986, Mountaingrove spent a 12-year period photographing women in the lesbian community in Oregon and other parts of the United States. She photographed meetings of the Oregon Women's Land Trust, documenting their lives at OWL Farm, a southern Oregon lesbian land community providing "access to rural land in order to be able to live outside of mainstream patriarchal culture".

The Mountaingroves separated in 1985.

== Her works as an artist ==
=== "For Those Who Cannot Sleep" ===
Her journey was recorded by the poetry series “For Those Who Cannot Sleep” which was written in the late 1950s when she was in age of 28 to 31 years and a housewife and a mother of the three young kids. This song includes spiritual expressions showing her severe journey, for example, describing "a world in which 'The H bomb hovers/Yet/Birds build/Trees feather into leaf'... 'If we cannot save ourselves/Who can save us?/(...)/Where is the sun?'.

=== “Who Killed the Women?” ===
In 1966, she wrote the song and was used at rallies and meetings in Philadelphia.

=== "Turned on Women" ===
This is a new kind of women-made songbooks at that time. Ruth made this original one, organized by other women, and women hired by her turned into the musical notation. She talked about the processes of these songs are created in the book like about inspirations. One of her purpose of making this book is "to encourage women to make their own music, sing their own songs." "Women's folk song writer" is what she chose as her title of herself, not composer. Ruth picked up small events that occur in everyday life and turned into the songs. For example, a song named "Haircut" is sung about her friend's haircut.

== Later work ==
After her 1986 move to Arcata, California, Mountaingrove's art shifted from documentary photography to more experimental darkroom and digital images through a process she called "drawing with light", exploring photography as an abstract artistic medium, "like sumi ink drawings, or in some cases like paintings". Her photography was exhibited in California, Massachusetts, Oregon, Pennsylvania, Texas, and Washington, and she held solo exhibits at three venues: Northcoast Internet, SHNEngineering, and The Lesbian, Gay, Bi-sexual, Transgendered Center.

== Death ==
Mountaingrove died on December 18, 2016, at age 93 at Ida Emmerson Hospice House in Eureka.

== See also ==
- Feminist art
- Goddess movement
- Lesbian feminism
