= Oregon Women's Land Trust =

American nonprofit organization

The Oregon Women's Land Trust is a 501(c)(3) membership organization that holds land for conservation and educational purposes in the U.S. state of Oregon. The trust owns 147 acres of land in Douglas County, referred to as OWL Farm, and the mission states that the Trust "is committed to ecologically sound preservation of land, and provides access to land and land wisdom for women."

== History ==
In the mid-1970s there was great interest among women engaged in the lesbian feminist movement in having access to rural land in order to be able to live outside of mainstream patriarchal culture, which was ridden with violence against women, gay people, and the environment. The feminist spirituality movement was also emerging and grounded in reverence for the natural world. For example, the magazine WomanSpirit was founded and produced nearby by Jean and Ruth Mountaingrove and had worldwide distribution. Some of the groups of women traveling or temporarily settled in Oregon, California, and New Mexico were wanting a land-based community where their political and spiritual ideals as lesbians, feminists, and environmentally minded folk could be put into practice. There were a few lands in southern Oregon already owned by feminist lesbians, and some where women lived together collectively but did not own the land. Many women visitors were drawn to the region and wanted to join this exciting and growing community of countrywomen.

Initially the farm was created as a place where economically disadvantaged women could stay with other women without the need for permanent residence or invitation. The farm was established as land that was accessible to women and children regardless of their financial status. The land would be held in perpetuity and in its initial form would be open for any women to come live on. Open land trust meetings were held in 1975 and 1976. Women collectively contributed money to buy the land together, giving anywhere between 25 and 5000 dollars. Money and support were raised by women with varying levels of economic means. Some members proposed the idea of each woman contributing ten percent of her money so that there would be a collective commitment to "recognize class privilege" and to make land available for all women, not just those who could afford it.

In the spring of 1976, a 147-acre piece of land was found in southern Oregon. Initial conversations about this idea arose from a WomanShare conference about money and power. Over time, the community reorganized financially into a federally recognized 501(c)(3) organization. Over 100 women attended the first meeting that took place at OWL Farm. Soon after this meeting, sixteen women met to form the caretaker collective and moved on to the land in July 1976.

As with many back to the land and intentional communities, the community at OWL farm faced challenges related to philosophical and political differences as well as interpersonal issues. These are documented in a number of writings by women who lived in the community.

In 1987, a resident caretaker remained and OWL Trust began hosting conferences and other events on the farm. The land continued to provide residential space but was no longer run as a collective. In 1999 the policy that had allowed any woman to live there without any prior vetting or approval was changed

== Goals ==
The Oregon Women's Land Trust's stated goals, as defined in their article of incorporation were to provide: women with access to land, to promote women's well-being, to encourage community that was "ecologically harmonious," to preserve the land and its natural resources, and to provide educational opportunities in land skills and country living for women.

== Early years ==
According to La Verne Gagehabib and Barbara Summerhawk, "Women had profound experiences of creating community together, in various combinations, for periods of months or years. Throughout OWL Farm's first twenty-five years, hundreds of women visited from all over the world. There was the exhilaration, as one ex-resident had shared, of learning how to use a tool one day, and teaching a newly arrived woman how to use it the next".

Issues of debate that were taking place in the wider Lesbian Feminist and Separatist Feminist movement were also alive within the OWL Farm community such as childrearing, division of labor, the place of male children in separatist community, private vs common ownership and monogamy vs nonmonogamy. Some children lived on the farm with their mothers.

== Current status ==
As of 2018, the trust had an active board and had had resident caretakers for most years since it ceased being a residential community. Infrastructure improvements continued with maintenance of buildings, water system improvements and restoration of the farm's original pond. As well as preserving and maintaining OWL Farm, the trust runs educational and wildland access programming in the areas of ecological land management, organic gardening, permaculture and outdoor skills. The Community offers hikes and gatherings The farm is also the last resting place of women members who have requested natural burial or interment of ashes.

== LNG pipeline lawsuit ==
In 2007, OWL Farm found itself on the path of a proposed 3-foot-wide gas export pipeline. The project was stopped through the regulatory process in 2010 and again in 2015, but was proposed again in January 2016 and as of 2018 was still going through the regulatory process. The project is called the Pacific Connector Pipeline, Jordan Cove LNG Terminal and would pipe fracked gas from Canada and the U.S. interior to Coos Bay where it would be compressed into Liquified Natural Gas (LNG) for export by tanker to Russia and China. OWL Trust is currently fighting the pipeline. not just across OWL Farm, but across Oregon, due to the conflict of this project with the environmental and land preservation mission of the Trust and likely negative impact on women and girls that arise with human trafficking that accompanies large infrastructure projects. Representatives from the Trust have been active members of Landowners United and Citizens Against the Pipeline and was featured by NPR regarding the pipeline
