= Mariana Romo-Carmona =

Chilean American author and academic

- Born: Mariana Virginia Romo-Carmona; 1952 (age 73–74)
- Occupations: Author, academic

Mariana Virginia Romo-Carmona (born 1952) is a Chilean American author and academic in the areas of Latin American literature and Latinx studies.

== Early life and education ==
Mariana Romo-Carmona was born in Santiago, Chile, in 1952. In the early 1960s, her family moved to Calama, in northern Chile, where they worked in the artistic and cultural spheres. Then, in 1966, the family immigrated to the United States, settling in Connecticut, where her father worked as an industrial designer.

After high school, she began attending the University of Connecticut, but she quickly married a classmate and gave birth to her son, Christian, which led her to leave college.

She later returned and graduated with a bachelor's degree from the university in 1982. She would go on to obtain a master's in Spanish from CUNY's City College of New York and then a PhD from the CUNY Graduate Center in 2019.

== Career and activism ==
Romo-Carmona came out as a lesbian in 1975, and when she and her husband divorced the following year, she lost custody of her son due to her sexuality, which radicalized her and led her to organize around her identity as a Latina lesbian. She became an engaged Latinx and LGBT rights activist. Over the years, she found ways to see her son, and eventually he lived with her and her longtime partner, June Chan, in his early adulthood.

In the late 1970s, Romo-Carmona began to produce the feminist and lesbian radio program "There Is Another Alternative" on WHUS FM in Connecticut. She co-founded Latina lesbian groups in Boston and in New York, where she settled long-term in 1984.

At Kitchen Table: Women of Color Press, she worked as a bilingual editor in the 1980s. There, with Cherríe Moraga and Alma Gómez, she co-edited the seminal bilingual anthology Cuentos: Stories by Latinas in 1983. She also served as an editor and translator for the Conditions feminist journal collective from 1998 to 1990. In 1992, she co-edited the collection Queer City. That same year, she established the queer magazine COLORLife! with Lidell Jackson, among others.

Romo-Carmona writes fiction and poetry in both English and Spanish, which has appeared in various anthologies and literary magazines. In 1997, she published the novel Living at Night. The novel, set in the late '70s, tells the story of a Puerto Rican lesbian living in Connecticut. It was followed in 1999 by the poetry and prose collection Speaking Like an Immigrant, then in 2011 by the collection Sobrevivir y otros complejos: Narrative Poems in englillano.

Her 2001 anthology Conversaciones: Relatos por padres y madres de hijas lesbianas e hijos gay, which shared the stories of parents of queer people, won the Lambda Literary Award for a small press publication the following year. It was the first Spanish-language collection of its kind.

Romo-Carmona teaches Latin American and Latinx studies at CUNY. She was previously on the faculty of the creative writing MFA program at Goddard College.

The documentation of her activist work is held at the Lesbian Herstory Archives in New York.

== Selected works ==
=== Fiction ===
- Speaking Like an Immigrant: A Collection. Revised and expanded edition. New York: Escritorial Press, 2010.
- Speaking Like an Immigrant: A Collection. First ed. New York: Latina Lesbian History Project, 1999.
- Living at Night. A novel. Duluth: Spinsters Ink, 1997.

=== Nonfiction ===
- Conversaciones: Relatos por padres y madres de hijas lesbianas e hijos gay. San Francisco: Cleis Press, 2001.

=== Poetry ===
- Sobrevivir y otros complejos: Narrative Poems in Englillano. New York: Escritorial Press, 2011.

=== Anthologies ===
- Queer City. Co-editors Harold Robinson, Ira Silverberg, and Jacqueline Woodson. New York: The Portable Lower East Side, 1992.
- Cuentos: Stories by Latinas. Co-editors: Alma Gómez and Cherríe Moraga. New York: Kitchen Table Press, 1983.

=== Translations ===
- Teaming: Monica’s Dream, by Jil Van Eyle and Mercedes Salvador. New York: Escritorial Press, 2012.
- La muchacha de los ojos tristes: Poemas, homenajes y estrés, by Noemí Trujillo Giacomelli. New York: Escritorial Press, 2011.
- Viviendo campo a través: Memoir, poems and stories, by Mercedes Salvador Acevedo. New York: Escritorial Press, 2011.
