= WomanSpirit =

Lesbian/feminist quarterly periodical

- Frequency: Quarterly
- Circulation: 3,000
- First issue: 1974
- Final issue: 1984
- Based in: Wolf Creek, Oregon
- Language: English
- Website: http://www.womanspirit.ws/
- OCLC: 3113446

WomanSpirit (Fall 1974 - Summer 1984) was a lesbian feminist quarterly founded by Ruth and Jean Mountaingrove and produced collectively near Wolf Creek, Oregon. It was the first American lesbian/feminist periodical to be dedicated to both feminism and spirituality. Many of the contributors to WomanSpirit were, or became, well known within the women's spirituality movement. It had 40 publications, covering topics such as ecology, goddess myths and rituals, feminist theory, and divination. Its submissions included articles, photos, letters, book reviews, artwork, and songs.

== History ==
WomanSpirit was founded by Ruth and Jean Mountaingrove in 1974, who had a vision for a magazine that was "international and radical feminist. We wanted a cultural revolution—a total reordering of institutions and values. It was to be a modest magazine with grand goals." In 1978, they bought and moved to Rootworks, their lesbian land. From 1979 to 1984, they produced Womanspirit in the barn they built ("Natalie Barney"). Women who came to work on the different issues could stay on the land for however long they needed to or could.

== Impact ==
At the height of WomanSpirit's circulation, it was distributed to 91 women's bookstores, 10 countries, and had over 3,000 subscribers. The existence of Rootworks and WomanSpirit has been credited by many women for bringing them into rural Oregon to participate in the women's land movement.

After it folded, Jean Mountaingrove suggested that an index be made and Christine Menefee offered to make one. It was published in 1989 and is out of print, but has been useful for researching feminist and women's history.

== Notable contributors ==
- Margot Adler
- Sally Binford
- Marion Zimmer Bradley
- Zsuzsanna Budapest
- Carol Christ
- Elsa Gidlow
- Selena Fox
- Sally Gearhart
- Patricia Monaghan
- Rosemary Radford Ruether
- Monica Sjöö
- Charlene Spretnak
- Luisah Teish

== See also ==
- Goddess movement
- List of lesbian periodicals
- Oregon Women's Land Trust
- Ruth Mountaingrove
