= Lydia Otero =

Chicanx historian

Academic background
- Education: University of Arizona
- Thesis: Conflicting visions: Urban renewal, historical preservation and the politics of saving a Mexican past (2003)

Lydia R. Otero is a Chicanx/Latinx historian and author whose scholarship examines urban history, displacement, historic preservation, and the experiences of Mexican American and queer communities in Arizona and Los Angeles.

== Education and career ==
Otero was born in Tucson and lived there until graduating from high school in 1973. Otero received a bachelor's degree in 1992 and a master's degree in 1995 from California State University, Los Angeles (CSULA). In 2003 they earned a Ph.D. from the University of Arizona. Otero was a tenured professor in the Department of Mexican American Studies Department at the University of Arizona (2003-2020).

== Academic work ==
Otero is known for their work on ethnic studies, latinx urbanization and placemaking in latinx communities. In the 1980s Otero was president of Gay and Lesbian Latinos Unidos and Lesbianas Unidas, politically active groups in California. Otero has participated in local activism to remind people about Tucson's past and connection to Mexico, and examined the impact on people living in neighborhoods targeted for urban renewal. In 2010, their book La Calle: Spatial Conflicts and Urban Renewal in a Southwestern City focused on an urban renewal project in Tucson, Arizona which targeted the most densely populated eighty acres in the state and the changes that occurred during the project. The book received a 2011 Southwest Book Award from the Border Regional Library Association, and was reviewed by multiple scholarly publications. In 2019 their book, In the Shadows of The Freeway: Growing Up Brown & Queer, combined personal memoir and family history with historical archives. In 2021, the Pima County Library selected the book as one of their annual 44th "Southwest Books of the Year", and the book was reviewed by the Los Angeles Review of Books and the Journal of Arizona History.

== Selected publications ==
- Otero, Lydia R. (2025) Storied Property: María Cordova's Casa . Tucson. Planet Earth Press. 978-1-7341180-4-9
- Otero, Lydia R (2023) L.A. Interchanges: A Brown & Queer Archival Memoir. Tucson. ISBN 978-1-7341180-8-7
- Otero, Lydia R. (2010). La Calle:Spatial Conflicts and Urban Renewal in a Southwest City. Tucson: University of Arizona Press. ISBN 978-0-8165-2888-2. OCLC 617461667.
- Otero, Lydia R. (2019). In the Shadows of the Freeway: Growing Up Brown & Queer (First ed.). Tucson, Arizona. ISBN 978-1734118001.
- Otero, Lydia R.; Cammarota, Julio (2011-10-01). "Notes from the Ethnic Studies home front: student protests, texting, and subtexts of oppression". International Journal of Qualitative Studies in Education. 24 (5): 639–648. doi:10.1080/09518398.2011.600267. ISSN 0951-8398. S2CID 143564585.

== Awards and honors ==
In 2019, Arizona’s César E. Chávez Holiday Coalition awarded Otero the "'Sí se puede' Legacy Award" for their activism and scholarship focusing on bringing awareness to the history of Arizona and Mexican Americans. In 2021, Otero was named a distinguished lecturer by the Organization of American Historians.
