= Anne Querrien =

French sociologist, queer/feminist activist

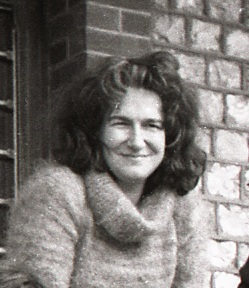
- Anne Querrien, CERFI meeting, circa 1970
- Born: December 13, 1945 (age 80); Paris, France
- Other name: "Morbic" (translator pseudonym)
- Occupations: Sociologist, urban planner
- Known for: Mutual schooling
- Movement: May 68, Front homosexuel d'action révolutionnaire

Anne Querrien (French: [kɛʁjɛ̃]; born 13 December 1945) is a French sociologist and urban planner. Her research focuses on philosophy of education, gender studies, and feminism. A prominent figure of May 68 and the emancipation movements of the 1970s, she collaborated closely with Félix Guattari and contributed to the founding of several major intellectual journals.

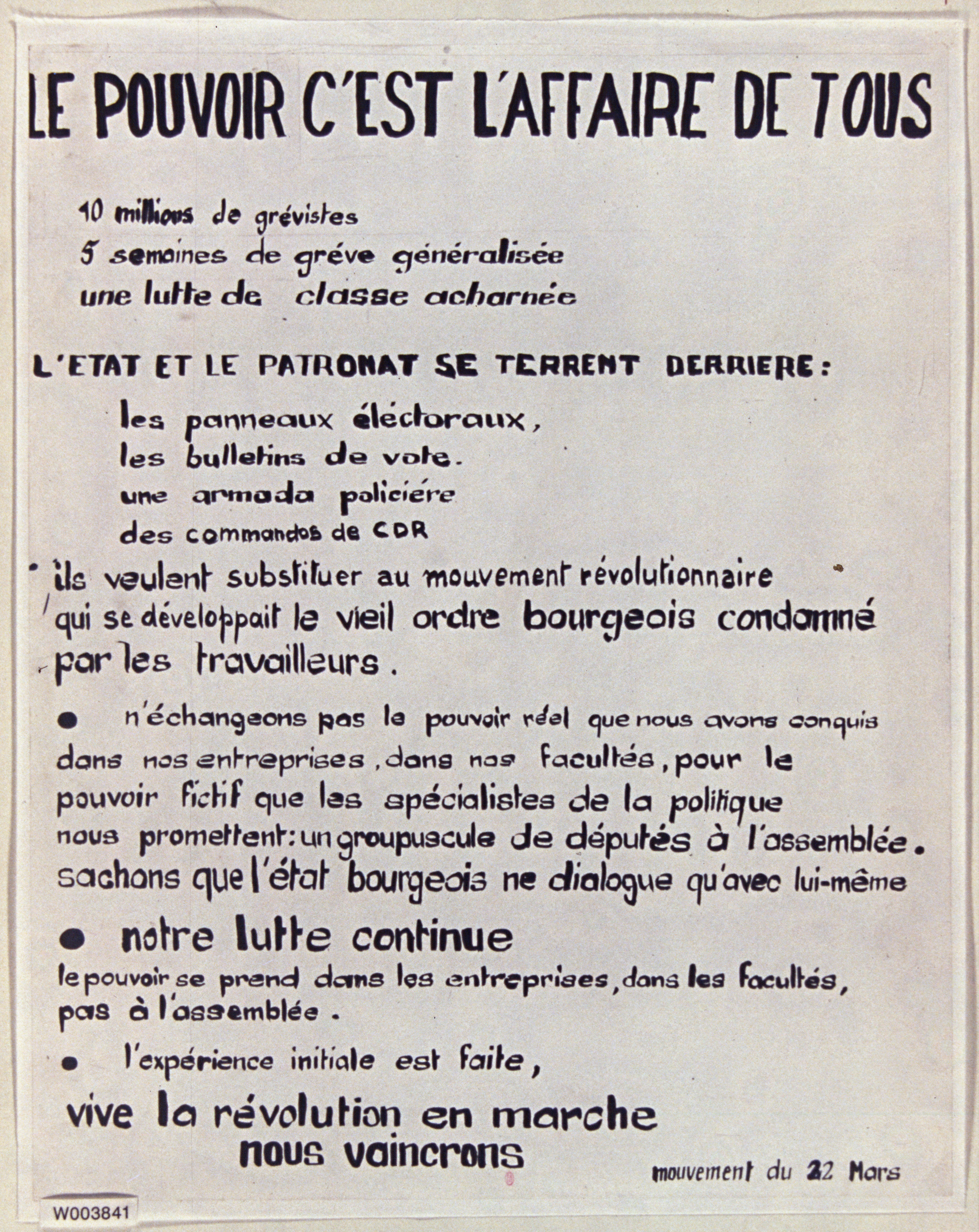
Le Pouvoir c'est l'affaire de tous, poster of the Mouvement du 22 mars

== Biography ==
=== Childhood, youth and political formation ===
The eldest of five sisters, Anne Querrien was born on 13 December 1945. She is the daughter of Max Querrien, a senior Breton civil servant who served as mayor of Paimpol from 1962 to 1995 and president of the Institut français d'architecture from 1982 to 1987.

A trade union activist during her sociology studies at the Paris Nanterre University and the School for Advanced Studies in the Social Sciences, she was one of the leading figures of the Mouvement du 22 mars at Nanterre and in Paris in 1968. She became secretary-general of the Center for the Study and Research of Institutional Formation (CERFI), founded in the 1970s, where she developed close ties with Félix Guattari and Guy Hocquenghem.

=== Homosexual activism ===
Anne Querrien took part in the Front homosexuel d'action révolutionnaire (FHAR), founded in March 1971, as documented in the film La révolution du désir (2006), directed by Alessandro Avellis, which traces the history of the FHAR and its connections with Guy Hocquenghem and Françoise d'Eaubonne.

In 1973, Anne Querrien was one of the coordinators of the landmark issue Trois milliards de pervers. Grande Encyclopédie des homosexualités (Recherches journal, no. 12, March 1973), edited by Félix Guattari. The issue brought together contributions from Gilles Deleuze, Michel Foucault, Jean-Paul Sartre, Jean Genet, and Guy Hocquenghem, among others. According to Gary Genosko, this publication was produced in six months with the help of Guy Hocquenghem, as several FHAR members joined the CERFI. Seized upon publication and condemned for "offence to public morals", the issue marked the eruption of homosexuality into French public debate.

=== Journals and editorial work ===
Anne Querrien co-founded and co-edited several major intellectual journals:

- Recherches (the CERFI journal, founded in 1965 by Félix Guattari)
- Chimères (founded by Gilles Deleuze and Félix Guattari in 1987; she served on the editorial board)
- Futur Antérieur (with Toni Negri)
- Les Annales de la recherche urbaine (editor-in-chief from 1985 to 2010, with Pierre Lassave and Marie-Flore Mattei)
- Multitudes (a political, artistic and philosophical journal she helped found in 2000, serving as co-director from 2008 to 2025)

=== Academic career ===
Following May 1968, Anne Querrien became a junior lecturer at the Institut national pour la formation des adultes, then taught sociology at the Paris 8, Paris 1, and the Évry-Val-d'Essonne University (now Évry Paris-Saclay). From 1979 to 2010 she worked as a research officer at the Urban Research Mission of the Ministry of Equipment, and subsequently as editor-in-chief of the Annales de la recherche urbaine.

== Research ==
=== Mutual Schooling ===
Anne Querrien is the author of important research on mutual schooling (école mutuelle), an early-nineteenth-century French pedagogical experiment. Her work, first published in the journal Recherches ("L'ensaignement", no. 23, 1976), was reissued in 2005 as L'école mutuelle : une pédagogie trop efficace ? by Les Empêcheurs de penser en rond (181 pp.), with a preface by philosopher Isabelle Stengers entitled "Une école mutuelle : ça existe ?".

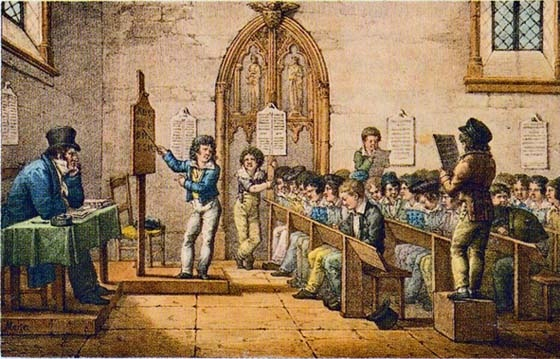
Interior view of a mutual school, Paris, 1815. Les tableaux de Paris, lithograph by Jean-Henri Marlet. Musée national de l'éducation, Rouen.

This genealogical study examines how the mutual school — a system in which pupils work in small groups and teach one another — was abolished despite its pedagogical effectiveness, notably because it allowed students to move through the intended curriculum far too quickly and failed to instil deference to hierarchical knowledge. According to Isabelle Stengers, the system was suppressed because students completed in three years a curriculum designed for six, and because, contrary to the intended outcome, they did not learn respect for hierarchical knowledge but instead developed "a practice of insubordination towards those who claim to think in the name of others, without others, for the greater good of others". This work extends Michel Foucault's analyses of the school apparatus in Discipline and Punish.

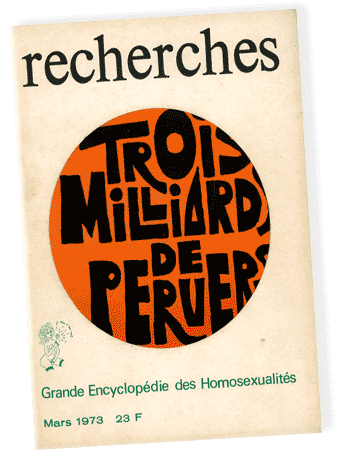
Trois milliards de pervers, issue 12 of the journal Recherches.

=== Gender and Feminist Studies ===
As coordinator of the pioneering anthology Trois milliards de pervers (1973) and translator of Dreaming the Dark (1982) by ecofeminist activist Starhawk, Anne Querrien also co-authored with anthropologist Monique Selim La libération des femmes, une plus-value mondiale (2015), which analyses women's liberation from a global economic perspective. She has also contributed numerous articles on feminism, particularly to the journal Multitudes.

== Selected Publications ==
=== Books ===
- (coord. with Félix Guattari), Trois milliards de pervers. Grande Encyclopédie des Homosexualités, Recherches, no. 12, 1973.
- Généalogie des équipements collectifs. L'École primaire, research report for the Ministry of Equipment, Fontenay-sous-Bois, CERFI, 1975.
- (with Éliane Brillaud) Ville et immigration : dossier bibliographique, Ministry of Equipment, La Défense, Éditions Villes et territoires, 1997. ISBN 2-11-082165-5
- En marge de la ville, au cœur de la société: ces quartiers dont on parle, (collective editorship), Paris, Éditions de l'Aube, 1997, 349 pp.
- L'école mutuelle : une pédagogie trop efficace ?, preface by Isabelle Stengers, Paris, Les Empêcheurs de penser en rond, 2005, 181 pp. ISBN 2-84671-133-X
- (with Monique Selim) La libération des femmes, une plus-value mondiale, Paris, L'Harmattan, coll. "Anthropologie Critique", 2015.
- (ed. with Marco Candore and Mayette Viltard) Chaoerrances/cohérences. Anarchies couronnées et hiérarchies de la représentation, Paris, Cahiers de l'Unebévue, 2017.
- (ed. with Anne Sauvagnargues and Arnaud Villani) Agencer les multiplicités avec Deleuze, Paris, Hermann, coll. "Colloque de Cerisy", 2019.

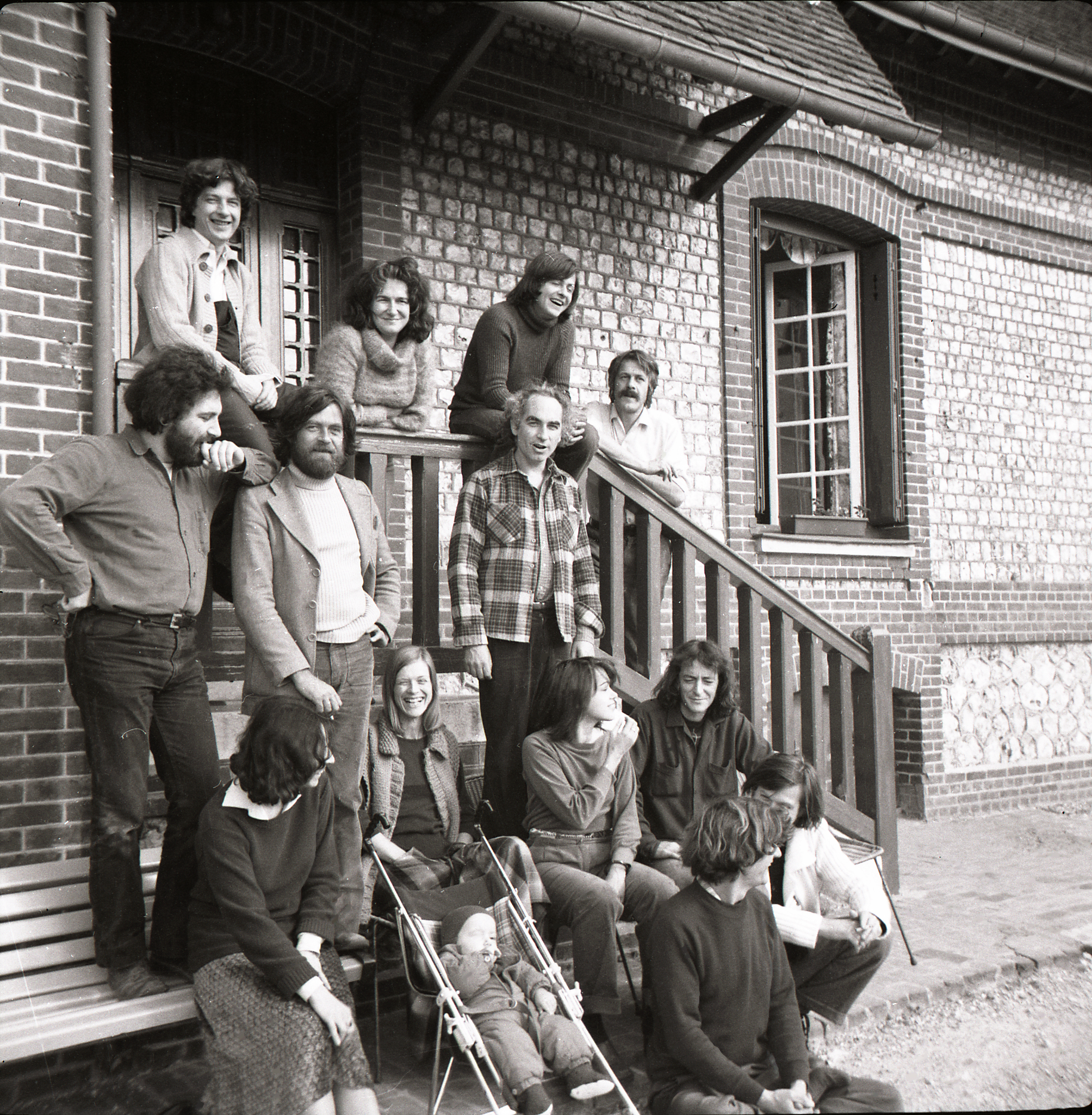
Anne Querrien (second from top left) at a CERFI meeting in Étretat, circa 1970.

=== Contributions to Edited Volumes ===
- "Le CERFI, l'expérimentation sociale et l'État : témoignage d'une petite main", in Philippe Bezes et al. (eds.), L'État à l'épreuve des sciences sociales, Paris, La Découverte, 2005.
- "Le fou, le passant, l'agent, le concepteur", in Daniel Cefaï and Carole Saturno (eds.), Itinéraire d'un pragmatiste. Autour d'Isaac Joseph, Economica, 2007.

== Translations ==
Anne Querrien translates from English and Italian into French, specialising in feminist, ecofeminist, and political philosophy texts.

Under the pseudonym Morbic (meaning "oystercatcher" in Breton), she translated Rêver l'obscur. Femmes magie et politique by ecofeminist activist and writer Starhawk (preface by Émilie Hache, afterword by Isabelle Stengers, published by Cambourakis in the "Sorcières" series, 2015). This choice of pseudonym echoes the author's name Starhawk (hawk of the stars) adopted by Miriam Simos.

Other translations include:

- Christian Marazzi, La place des chaussettes : le tournant linguistique de l'économie et ses conséquences politiques (Il posto dei calzini), translated from Italian with François Rosso, Paris, Éditions de l'Éclat, 1997. ISBN 2-84162-013-1
- Christian Marazzi, Et vogue l'argent, translated from Italian with François Rosso, La Tour-d'Aigues, Éditions de l'Aube, 2004. ISBN 2-87678-811-X
- Christian Marazzi, La brutalité financière – Grammaire de la crise (Finanza bruciata), translated from Italian with François Rosso, Paris–Lausanne, Éditions de l'éclat / Réalités sociales, 2013. ISBN 978-2-84162-296-2
- McKenzie Wark, Un manifeste hacker, translated from English by the collective "Club post-1984 Mary Shelley et Cie Hacker Band", Paris, Criticalsecret, 2006, 496 pp. available online
- Toni Negri, Exil, translated from Italian with François Rosso, Paris, Mille et une nuits, coll. "Les Petits Libres" no. 19, 1998.
- Various articles by Donna Haraway, McKenzie Wark, Brian Massumi, and Erin Manning, translated from English for the journal Multitudes.

== Bibliography ==
- Janet H. Morford, Histoires du CERFI: la trajectoire d'un collectif de recherche sociale, DEA thesis, EHESS, October 1985. available online
- Stengers, Isabelle (2005). "Une école mutuelle : ça existe ?". L'école mutuelle : une pédagogie trop efficace ?. Paris: Les Empêcheurs de penser en rond. pp. 13–22.
- Gary Genosko, "Three Billion Perverts", Rhizomes, no. 11/12, 2005. available online
- Julien Pallotta, L'école mutuelle au-delà de Foucault, Toulouse, EuroPhilosophie Éditions, coll. "Contre\Champs", 2017; chapter 2: "Anne Querrien et l'école mutuelle : une pédagogie alternative?" available online
- Jean-Baptiste Devaux, Une fabrique d'expérimentations politiques: la revue Multitudes , laboratoire savant contestataire (2000–2014), M2 thesis, Sciences Po Grenoble, 2015. available online
- Antoine Idier, Archives des mouvements LGBT+ : Une histoire de luttes de 1890 à nos jours, Paris, Textuel, 2018, 255 pp.

== Filmography ==
- Alessandro Avellis (dir.), La révolution du désir, documentary on the FHAR, 2006, 80 min.
- Giampaolo Penco (dir.), Il frastuono e il silenzio, documentary on Toni Negri, 2024, 112 min.
