= List of Celtic fusion artists =

The following is a list of notable musicians who compose or have composed Celtic fusion music.

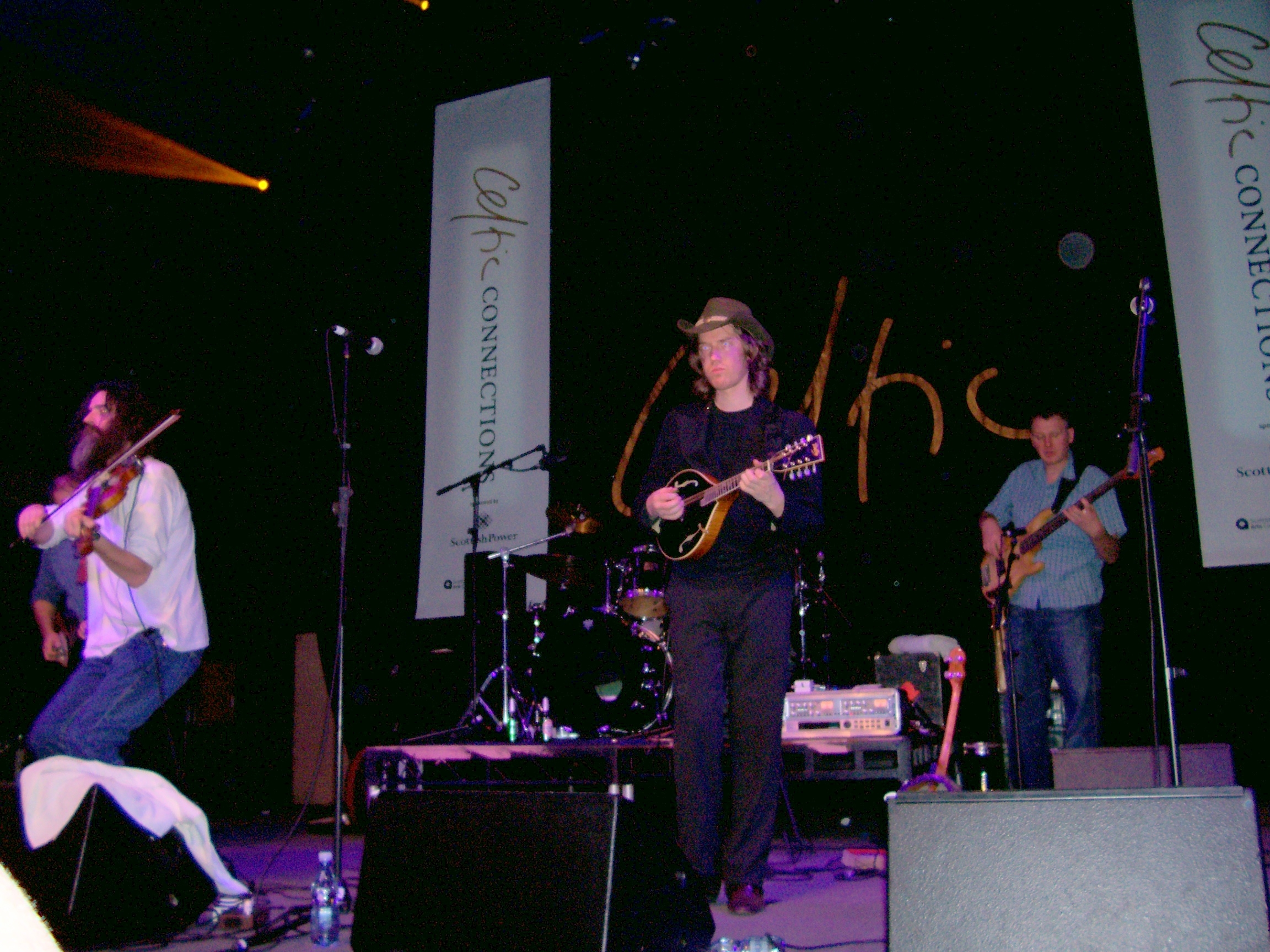
Shooglenifty playing at Celtic Connections 2007

== A ==
- Afro Celt Sound System

== B ==
- Bad Haggis featuring Eric Rigler
- Baka Beyond
- Bodega
- Bongshang
- Beltaine's Fire
- Martyn Bennett
- Blaggards

== C ==
- Capercaillie
- Carbon Leaf
- Ceredwen
- Clannad
- The Corrs
- Croft No. 5
- The Crossing
- Cruachan

== D ==
- The Dreaming
- Dropkick Murphys

== E ==
- Enter the Haggis
- Enya

== F ==
- Figgy Duff
- Flogging Molly
- Finn MacCool

== G ==
- Gaelic Storm
- The Gloaming
- Glengarry Bhoys
- Great Big Sea

== I ==
- The Iron Horse

== K ==
- Kíla
- Sharon Knight

== L ==
- La Bottine Souriante
- Leahy
- Nolwenn Leroy
- The Levellers
- Lucid Druid
- Lúnasa

== M ==
- Manau
- Mark Saul
- Marxman
- Alyth McCormack
- Michael McGoldrick
- Mill a h-Uile Rud
- Loreena McKennitt
- Ashley MacIsaac
- Natalie MacMaster
- Moondragon
- Mouth Music
- Mudmen

== N ==
- Neck

== O ==
- Ockham's Razor
- Old Blind Dogs

== P ==
- Paul Mounsey
- Peatbog Faeries
- Pipedown
- The Pogues
- Primordial

== R ==
- Rare Air
- The Real Mckenzies
- Ron Korb
- Roving Crows
- Runrig

== S ==
- Salsa Celtica
- Mark Saul
- Seelyhoo
- Serena Smith & Friends
- Seven Nations
- Shooglenifty
- Skelpin
- Skyedance
- Slainte Mhath
- Spirit of the West
- Gary Stadler
- Alan Stivell

== U ==
- Uisce Beatha

== V ==
- Valtos (band)

== W ==
- Wolfstone

== See also ==
- Celtic music
- Celtic fusion
