= T. Thorn Coyle =

American neopagan author and teacher (born 1965)

T. Thorn Coyle (born September 24, 1965) is a Neopagan author and teacher, dancer, singer/composer, and activist from the United States. They practiced within the Feri and Reclaiming traditions of witchcraft before developing their own approach integrating other spiritual practices. Their writings include urban fantasy and instruction on magical spiritual practice.

== Early life and education ==
Formerly known as Theresa Dutton, T. Thorn Coyle was born in Whittier, California, and reared in the Catholic faith. They first learned of Paganism at age 13, and had their first training as a witch at 16. They moved to San Francisco at age 18. They studied the Feri tradition of witchcraft with Cora and Victor Anderson, and were initiated in Feri and Reclaiming. They cite the punk and anarchist movements as important early influences. Coyle studied dance and was part of the early spread of American Tribal Belly Dance. They have studied Gurdjieff and Sufism, including several years with the Mevlevi Whirling Dervishes. They earned a B.A. in philosophy and religion from San Francisco State University in 2003, and were initiated into Phi Beta Kappa.

== Career ==
Coyle taught witchcraft in both Feri and Reclaiming traditions. Around 2009, citing the desire to integrate other mystical perspectives and their own experience, Coyle separated their work from the Feri tradition. They founded the Morningstar Mystery School to continue their teaching.

Coyle has published several books on magic and spiritual practice that detail meditations and exercises for personal growth and empowerment. Their first book, Evolutionary Witchcraft, serves as a "magical workbook" for the Feri tradition and reflects practices they developed including "devotional dances." It also reflects the influences of Sufism, Gurdjieff, and radical Catholicism on their approach to magic. Their later books on spiritual practice include instruction on using magic to support the "Great Work" of union with the divine.

Coyle presented at the Parliament of the World's Religions in 2009 and 2015.

In 2015, they began focusing on writing fiction. Most of their novels, including the series The Panther Chronicles and The Witches of Portland, are fantasy with themes of magic and social justice. They have also contributed to magazines, blogs, and published collections.

Coyle is also known as a singer and composer of pagan chants who has made several recordings, including two collections of seasonal chants in collaboration with Sharon Knight.

Coyle is a life-long activist for social justice issues, and sees their writing, magical practice, and activism as interrelated. They have demonstrated for causes such as anarchism and anti-racism.

== Personal life ==
Coyle moved to Portland, Oregon in 2016.

Coyle is non-binary, noting that while they have long felt to be no particular gender, they have often been perceived as a woman.

Thorn Coyle has many tattoos, and wrote this of them in 1997: "Tattoos are spiritual markers for me. When I started getting them ten years ago, it came from a need to have rites of passage that included spiritual reminders and physical markers. All my tattoos have a spiritual meaning to me, and layers of meaning that shift over time." Some of Coyle's tattoos were photographed by Charles Gatewood.

== Works ==
=== Non-fiction ===
- Evolutionary Witchcraft. New York : J.P. Tarcher/Penguin, c2004. ISBN 978-1-58542-347-7.
- Kissing the Limitless: Deep Magic and the Great Work of Transforming Yourself and the World. York Beach, ME: Weiser, 2009. ISBN 978-1-57863-435-4.
- Crafting a Daily Practice: A Simple Course on Self-commitment. Sunna Press, 2012; 2nd edition, 2017.
- Make Magic of Your Life: Passion, Purpose, and the Power of Desire. San Francisco, CA: Weiser, 2013. ISBN 978-1-57863-538-2
- Sigil Magic: For Writers, Artists, and Other Creatives. Sunna Press, 2015.

=== Fiction ===
- Like Water, PF Publishing, 2015.
- Alighting on his Shoulders: Ten Tales from the Sideways Worlds, PF Publishing, 2015.
- Break Apart the Stone: Ten Tales from the Sideways Worlds, PF Publishing, 2017.
- To Raise a Clenched Fist to the Sky (The Panther Chronicles #1). PF Publishing, 2017.
- To Wrest our Bodies from the Fire (The Panther Chronicles #2). PF Publishing, 2017.
- To Drown this Fury in the Sea (The Panther Chronicles #3). PF Publishing, 2017.
- To Stand with Power on this Ground (The Panther Chronicles #4). PF Publishing, 2017.
- By Earth (The Witches of Portland #1). PF Publishing, 2018.
- By Flame (The Witches of Portland #2). PF Publishing, 2018.
- By Wind (The Witches of Portland #3). PF Publishing, 2018.
- By Sea (The Witches of Portland #4). PF Publishing, 2018.
- By Moon (The Witches of Portland #5). PF Publishing, 2018.
- By Sun (The Witches of Portland #6). PF Publishing, 2018.
- By Dusk (The Witches of Portland #7). Kindle edition, 2019.
- By Dark (The Witches of Portland #8). Kindle edition, 2019.
- By Witch's Mark (The Witches of Portland #9). Kindle edition, 2019.
- We Seek No Kings (The Steel Clan Saga #1). PF Publishing, 2020.
- We Heed No Laws (The Steel Clan Saga #2). PF Publishing, 2021.

=== Audio recordings ===
- Face of a New Day, 1998.
- Give Us a Kiss, 2000.
- Songs for the Waning Year (with Sharon Knight), Trance Jam Records, 2009.
- Songs for the Strengthening Sun (with Sharon Knight), Trance Jam Records, 2009.
