= My Super 8 Season =

- Directed by: Alessandro Avellis
- Written by: Alessandro Avellis
- Starring: Axel Philippon; Célia Pilastre; Roman Girelli; Magali Domec; Antoine Mory
- Cinematography: Nicolas Lefièvre
- Edited by: Alessandro Avellis
- Music by: Stéphane Gérard, Cédric Lédoré, Alex Henon, Jean Soulier, Fabrice Ploquin and Pauline Fraisse
- Production company: Les Films du Contraire
- Distributed by: Antiprod
- Release date: 2005 (France)
- Running time: 74 minutes
- Country: France
- Language: French

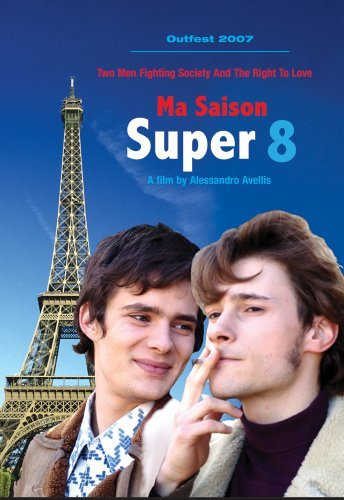
My Super 8 Season Cover

My Super 8 Season (also known in French as Ma saison super 8) is a 2005 French film by Alessandro Avellis that deals with gay and lesbian issues.

== Synopsis ==
In the early 1970s, an attractive young Parisian student, Marc, tries to organize students to fight for gay rights. Meanwhile, his best friend, Julie, becomes involved in feminist and class causes. Sparks fly when these disparate groups unite in opposition to the status quo during a heated radio show debate, leading to radical changes.

My Super 8 Season is freely inspired by the story of the FHAR, the Homosexual Revolutionary Action Front, and dedicated to its leaders Guy Hocquenghem and Françoise d'Eaubonne.

== Cast ==
- Axel Philippon as Marc
- Célia Pilastre as Julie
- Roman Girelli as André
- Magali Domec as Marguerite
- Antoine Mory as Stéphane
- Nicolas Quilliard as Le père de Marc
- Thierry Barèges as Vincent
- Jean-Pierre Frankfower as Le professeur
- Nicolas Christin as Le flic en civil
- Nicolas Villena as L'amant de Julie
- Jean-Marc Cozic as Le commissaire
- Rivka Braun as La voisine

== Festival screenings ==
=== 2005 ===
- Festival du film gay et lesbien – Paris (France)

=== 2006 ===
- Festival du film gay et lesbien – Brussels (Belgium)
- Da Sodoma a Hollywood – Turin (Italy)
- Vues d’en face – Grenoble (France), Journées du cinema gay – Rouen (France)
- Image+Nation – Montreal (Canada)

=== 2007 ===
- The New Fest – New York (US)
- Austin Int’l G&L Film Festival – Austin (US)
- Reel Affirmations – Washington (US)
- Corona Cork Film Festival – Cork (Ireland)
- Reeling Int’l G&L Film Festival – Chicago (US)
- Mix Brasil - São Paulo, Brasília, Rio de Janeiro (Brazil)

=== 2008 ===
- Mix Brasil Tour 2008 (Brazil)
- Festival Désirs Désirs – Tours (France)
- Mardi Gras Film Festival – Sydney (Australia)
- London L&G Film Festival – London (UK)
- Melbourne Queer Film Festival – Melbourne (Australia)
- Outfest – Los Angeles 2008 (US)
- Q! Film Festival – Jakarta, Bali, Surabaya (Indonesia)
- Llamale H - Uruguay Int‘l Film Festival – Montevideo 2008 (Uruguay)
- Seattle Lesbian & Gay Film Festival – Seattle 2008 (US)
- Pride Film Festival – Johannesburg, Pretoria, Durban (South Africa)
- Florence Queer Festival – Florence 2008 (Italy)

== DVD ==
- Antiprod 2006 (France, Belgium, Switzerland, Luxembourg)
