= Look Both Ways =

Look Both Ways may also refer to:

- Look Both Ways (2005 film), an Australian film
- Look Both Ways (2022 film), an American film
- Look Both Ways (album), a 2017 album by Steamchicken
- Look Both Ways, an album by The Crossing (band)
- Look Both Ways (novel), a 2019 novel by Jason Reynolds
- Look Both Ways: Bisexual Politics, a memoir by Jennifer Baumgardner
- Look Both Ways: Illustrated Essays on the Intersection of Life and Design, a non-fiction book by Debbie Millman
- "Look Both Ways" (Doctors), a 2004 television episode
