= The Spiral Dance =

Book by Starhawk

- Author: Starhawk
- Language: English
- Publisher: Harper & Row
- Publication date: 1979
- Publication place: United States
- Media type: Print (Hardback & Paperback)
- ISBN: 978-0-060-67535-6 (1st Ed.)
- Dewey Decimal: 299.94
- LC Class: 79001775

The Spiral Dance: a Rebirth of the Ancient Religion of the Great Goddess is a book about Neopagan beliefs and practices written by Starhawk. It was first published in 1979, with a second edition in 1989 and a third edition in 1999. It is a book on Wicca, modern witchcraft, spiritual feminism, the Goddess movement, and ecofeminism. The book has been translated into German and Danish.

== Background ==
The Spiral Dance is Starhawk's first book. After a failed attempt to become a fiction writer in New York City, she returned to California, and became active in the Neopagan community in the San Francisco Bay Area. She decided to try her hand at nonfiction and wrote a book on Goddess religion, which she finished in 1977 but was unable to publish at first. Her luck changed when feminist religious scholar Carol P. Christ included an article on Witchcraft and the Goddess movement in the anthology Womanspirit Rising (1979). Christ put Starhawk in touch with an editor at Harper & Row, who eventually published the book. In 1979, partly to commemorate the publication of the book, Starhawk and her friends staged a public celebration of the Neopagan holiday of Samhain incorporating an actual spiral dance. This group became the Reclaiming Collective; the annual Spiral Dance ritual now draws hundreds of participants.

The book was revised for 10th- and 20th-anniversary editions in 1989 and 1999, respectively. The original text of the book was left largely untouched. The revisions consist for the most part of introductions and notes reflecting on the origins of the book and the rituals it describes, and changes to the author's beliefs and practices since writing the book.

Although commonly read as a book on Wicca, The Spiral Dance is distinguished by its mysticism and experience, and by its emphasis on women and the Goddess (although it also brings in the God, similar to most forms of Wicca). Starhawk trained with Victor Anderson, founder of the Feri Tradition of witchcraft, and with Zsuzsanna Budapest, a feminist separatist involved in Dianic Wicca.

== Casualty figures ==
In The Spiral Dance, Starhawk stated that up to nine million people, mostly women, were killed during the Witch Hunts in early modern Europe. The number was based on an article by Mary Daly, who based it on the writings of the 19th century feminist Matilda Joslyn Gage, and has no basis in research. (Most estimates based on research range from 60,000 to 100,000.) In the book's 10th anniversary edition, she states: "Actually, estimates range between a low of one hundred thousand and this figure [nine million], which is probably high. The truth, clearly, is that nobody knows exactly how many people died in the persecutions."
