= Spiral dance =

Group dance in American Neopaganism

The spiral dance, also called the grapevine dance and the weaver’s dance, is a traditional group dance practiced in Neopaganism in the United States, especially in feminist Wicca and the associated "Reclaiming" movement. It is designed to emphasize "community and rebirth", and is also used "to raise power in a ritual".

== History ==
The spiral dance is a central ritual dance to Reclaiming Witches. The first spiral dance was performed in Berkeley, California, and was performed in a ritual intended to meld art, music, and politics as well as to celebrate the publication of The Spiral Dance by Starhawk. It turned into a yearly ritual, although a large portion of the politics were removed for later versions of the ritual and it currently exists as a Samhain celebration to honor the dead and celebrate rebirth.

== Performance ==
The spiral dance usually involves a drumming group and a chant or song in addition to the dancers. All members present hold hands and follow a leader in a counter-clockwise motion using a grapevine step. As the leader comes near closing the circle, he or she whips around and begins moving clockwise while facing the rest of the dancers. By continuing this formation, every dancer in the line will eventually be face to face with every other dancer.

In some close-knit circles, where people are comfortable with the idea, a kiss is given to each person at the moment they pass each other in the dance. In some cases kissing may be discouraged during large or public rituals, due to disruptions of the rhythm of the dance.

== In popular culture ==
The 1990s adventure game Conquests of the Longbow: The Legend of Robin Hood depicts Maid Marian as a forest priestess whose duties include, among other things, a one-person spiral dance.

== See also ==
- Reclaiming (Neopaganism)
- The Spiral Dance, 1979 book
