= M. Macha Nightmare =

American Neopagan witch

M. Macha NightMare (Aline O'Brien) is an American Neopagan witch. She was born in Milford, Connecticut and was one of the founders of the Reclaiming Collective in the 1970s.

In Witching Culture, Sabina Magliocco noted that Nightmare played a key role for several years in the "Spiral Dance", a ritual and dance commemorating the dead performed by Reclaiming for the San Francisco Bay community's Samhain holiday. Nightmare's comments on significant aspects of the emergent Neopagan culture appear throughout Magliocco's book: trance and deity possession, the importance of dance in ritual, rites of passage, design of an initiation ceremony, and the role of folklore in the development of Neopagan consciousness. Jone Salomonsen also cited Nightmare as an authority on Neopagan culture in San Francisco throughout her 2002 book, Enchanted Feminism.

In 2012 NightMare left the Reclaiming Collective, citing that she and the current form of the Reclaiming Collective were incompatible.

NightMare represented Pagans on the Biodiversity Project Spirituality Working Group. She is a member of the American Academy of Religion, Nature Religions Scholars Network, Marin Interfaith Council, United Religions Initiative, Interfaith Center of the Presidio, as well as serving on the Advisory Councils of the Sacred Dying Foundation, and PEARL (Pagan Elders Assistance and Resource League). In 2019 she founded the Earth-based Spirituality Action Team within Citizens' Climate Lobby. In addition, she serves on the Board of Directors of Cherry Hill Seminary.

== Bibliography ==
- 1981 - "WomanBlood: Portraits of Women in Poetry and Prose" edited by Aline O'Brien, Chrys Rasmussen and M. Catherine Costello, (Continuing Saga Press) ISBN 0-939140-00-4
- 1997 - The Pagan Book of Living and Dying: Practical Rituals, Prayers, Blessings, and Meditations on Crossing Over (with Starhawk) (HarperSanFrancisco) ISBN 0-06-251516-0
- 2000 - "Encyclopedia of Feminist Theories" edited by Lorraine Code (Routledge) (contributor) ISBN 0415308852
- 2000 - "Encyclopedia of Occultism and Parapsychology" edited by J. Gordon Melton (contributor) (The Gale Group) ISBN 081035487X
- 2000 - "Encyclopedia of Wicca & Witchcraft" edited by Raven Grimassi (contributor) (Llewellyn Publications) ISBN 1567182577 entry on Reclaiming Tradition Witchcraft.
- 2001 - Witchcraft and the Web: Weaving Pagan Traditions Online (ECW Press) ISBN 1-55022-466-2
- 2002 - Irish Spirit: Pagan, Celtic, Christian, Global edited by Patricia Monaghan (contributor) (Wolfhound Press) ISBN 0-86327-875-2
- 2003 - "Women in Leadership in Faith: Voices of Hope and Healing in a Troubled World" and
- 2003 - "Hope and Healing in a Troubled World: Prayers Selected by Women Faith Leaders" edited by Roberta Swan (contributor)
- 2004 - Pagan Pride: Honoring the Craft and Culture of Earth and Goddess (Citadel Press) ISBN 0-8065-2548-7
- 2005 - "Celebrating the Pagan Soul: Our Own Stories of Inspiration and Community" edited by Laura Wildman Hanlon (contributor) (Citadel Press/ Kensington Publishing Corp.) ISBN 0806526246
- 2005 - "Exploring the Pagan Path: Wisdom from Elders" edited by Kristin Madden (contributor) (New Page Books) ISBN 1564147886
- 2008 - "Green Egg Omelette: An Anthology of Art and Articles from the Legendary Pagan Journal" edited by Oberon Zell-Ravenheart (contributor) (New Page Books) ISBN 1601630468
