= Sharon Knight =

Sharon Knight may refer to:

- Sharon Knight (musician)
- Sharon Knight (politician)
