= Sharon Knight (musician) =

American singer

- Birth name: Sharon Elizabeth Knight
- Genres: Celtic, neofolk, rock, folk metal, world, new age
- Occupation(s): Musician, songwriter, record producer
- Instrument(s): Voice, guitar, mandola, percussion
- Years active: 1986-present
- Labels: Trance Jam Records
- Website: Official website

Sharon Knight is a San Francisco-based neopagan composer, singer, and multi-instrumentalist known for writing, recording, and performing Celtic fusion music she calls Neofolk Romantique. She also records and performs harder edged music with Middle Eastern themes as the front-person of the pagan rock/folk metal group Pandemonaeon. Knight is the co-owner of Trance Jam Records.

== Biography ==
Sharon Elizabeth Knight was born on January 8, 1966, and raised in Redwood City, California. She studied in the Feri tradition of witchcraft with Gabriel Carrillo. Knight has also studied Thelema and Tibetan Buddhism. In 1994, she married the German musician Winter, who has been her musical collaborator since.

== Career ==
Knight's debut album, Incantation, was released in 1996, followed by the self-titled Pandemonaeon debut (2001), Temple of Dreams-Live! (2003), and her second solo album, Song of the Sea (2004), featuring two duets with Shay Black of the Black Family. Two of Knight's songs from Song of the Sea, "May Morning Dew" and "Song of the Sea", also appear on Sequoia Records' Celtic Lounge I (2006) and Celtic Lounge II (2007). The latter contains a music video for "Song of the Sea. Knight collaborated with electronica artist Hands Upon Black Earth on their 2004 and 2009 albums Hands Upon Black Earth and Translucent. Other collaborations include Knight’s work with pagan author T. Thorn Coyle (Songs for the Waning Year: A Collection of Chants to Celebrate the Dark Time of the Year, 2008; Songs for the Strengthening Sun: A Collection of Chants to Celebrate the Return of the Sun, 2009). Her third Pandemonaeon album, Dangerous Beauty, was released in 2010. In 2013 Knight released her third solo album, Neofolk Romantique, another blend of original songs and Celtic traditionals.

Knight and Winter have been touring nationally since 2010.

== Genre and work ==
Knight's work often falls under the category of Celtic new age even though there are many more cross-cultural elements involved in her music. The same is true for her rock/folk metal band, Pandemonaeon, which due to its Middle Eastern and Goth influence, she describes as "music for bellydancers in combat boots." In her Celtic work, Knight is most often compared to Loreena McKennitt and Stevie Nicks, although her early musical influences are Planxty, Steeleye Span, Pentangle, and Fairport Convention.

== Discography ==
- Flowinglass Music - First of May, For Earth and Her People (1986)
- Morrigan Records - Various Artists, Fire & Stone: Pagan Rock Volume 1 (1999)
- Trance Jam Records

Sharon Knight, Incantation (1996)
Pandemonaeon, Pandemonaeon (2001)
Pandemonaeon, Temple of Dreams - Live! (2003)
Sharon Knight, Siren Songs (2004)
Sharon Knight, Song of the Sea (2004)
Sharon Knight & T. Thorn Coyle, Songs for the Waning Year: A Collection of Chants to Celebrate the Dark Time of the Year, (2008)
Sharon Knight & T. Thorn Coyle, Songs for the Strengthening Sun: A Collection of Chants to Celebrate the Return of the Sun, (2009)
Pandemonaeon, Dangerous Beauty (2010)
Sharon Knight, Neofolk Romantique (2013)
Sharon Knight, Portals (2016)

- Seqouia Records

Various Artists, Celtic Lounge I (2006)
Various Artists, Celtic Lounge II (2007)

- Cyberset Music - Hands Upon Black Earth, Hands Upon Black Earth (2004)
- Hrair Tanielian - Raven, 345-S (2008)
- Asizazoon Music - Hands Upon Black Earth, Translucent (2009)
- Banshee Records - Various Artists, The Best of Pagan Folk 2 (2012)

== Videos ==
Song of the Sea (El Mundo Bueno Studios, 2007)
Stretched on Your Grave (El Mundo Bueno Studios, 2009)

== Other ==
Cry For the Forest (Earthfilms, 1998, a short film about Julia Butterfly's Luna tree-sit, soundtrack use)
Dark Imaginations (Anaar, 2008, bellydance instructional DVD, soundtrack contribution)
Beatific Vision (Sountru, 2008, feature film, DVD, soundtrack contribution)
The Commune (Elisabeth Fies, 2009, feature film, DVD, soundtrack contribution)
