= Gwydion Pendderwen =

American musician (1946–1982)

Thomas deLong (May 21, 1946 – November 6, 1982), better known as Gwydion Pendderwen, was an American musician, writer, poet, conservationist and witch.

== Early life ==
Pendderwen was born in Berkeley, California, on May 21, 1946.

== Career ==
Pendderwen became a student and "craft-son" to Victor Anderson and Cora Anderson, learned the Feri Tradition of witchcraft from them, and helped popularize it in the Neopagan community. In addition to being credited with naming the tradition (originally spelled "Faerie"), he wrote many poems and liturgical materials for the tradition, as well as initiating many others into the tradition. His "descendants" have come to be known as the Watchmaker line of Feri.

He was a co-founder of two other organizations with Alison Harlow. One was "Nemeton", a Neopagan networking group. Nemeton quickly spread, opening regional offices all across the United States, forming a huge networking organization that played an important key role in the early growth of Pagan and Wiccan networking in America. In 1977 Oberon Zell, Morning Glory and Alison Harlow co-founded the "Holy Order of Mother Earth" (HOME) as a monastic sanctuary dedicated to nature. Other pagans soon began to arrive and join them, amongst them: Anodea Judith, Eldri Littlewolf and Anna Korn. They formed a pagan-based magical working group representing many differing traditions, including: Feri, Dianic, British Traditional, the New and Reformed Druids of North America (NRDNA), Celtic/Shamanic Wicca, Church of All Worlds (CAW), Strega and elements of ceremonial magic. Later in 1978 Nemeton merged with the Church of All Worlds and became its publishing arm.

The other was "Forever Forests", an ecological mission dedicated to healing the planet through reforestation and other methods of addressing ecological issues. They held annual tree planting festivals on the land at Annwfn; since then tens of thousands of trees such as Cedar, Pine, Douglas Fir and Redwood have been planted all over Northern California.

After being recognized for his music at a celebration in Wales in 1976, Pendderwen returned to California, quit his job with the Internal Revenue Service, and purchased a plot of the Greenfield Ranch in Mendocino County. Naming his parcel Annwfn after the Welsh underworld, he later gift-deeded the property to the Church of All Worlds with which he had long been involved.

== Death ==
Gwydion Pendderwen died in an automobile accident at the age of 36 on November 6, 1982, on State Highway 20 in Lake County, California, west of the town of Upper Lake. According to the California Highway Patrol, his car ran off of the roadway, he overcorrected, and the vehicle ran across both lanes and overturned, throwing him out of the vehicle and then rolling on top of him and then coming to a rest right-side up. As with other news reports at the time, his funeral announcement identified him as "Thomas Oliver DeLong" and made not mention of his career as Pendderwen.

== Music ==
Pendderwen released his first album, Songs for the Old Religion, in 1975, followed by a book of his music and lyrics titled Wheel of the Year in 1979. His second album, The Fäerie Shaman, was released in 1982. Both albums and the songbook were well received by the Pagan community; the songbook included many songs which became classics within the community, and the two albums were collected as a two-CD set titled The Music of Gwydion and published by Serpentine Music. Pendderwen also served for a time as a court bard to the West Kingdom of the Society for Creative Anachronism.

== Discography ==
- Songs for the Old Religion – Nemeton (1975)
- The Fäerie Shaman – Nemeton (1982)
- The Music of Gwydion – Serpentine Music (1991)

== Bibliography ==
- Wheel of the Year – Nemeton (1979)
- The Rites of Summer – Nemeton (1980)

== See also ==
- Neopagan music
