= Bad Haggis =

Bad Haggis is a band based in the United States and led by piper Eric Rigler. A tune by Bad Haggis was used in the first season of Crossing Jordan. Rigler has played bagpipes on several movies and has been described as "the world's most recorded piper". He played the pipes at former President Ronald Reagan's memorial service.

== Current members ==
- Eric Rigler - uilleann pipes, great highland bagpipes, Scottish smallpipe, tin whistle
- Mike Hoffmann - electric guitar, acoustic guitar
- Mick Linden - electric bass, vocals
- Bryon Holley - drums
- Alberto Lopez - percussion

== Past members ==
- Rogerio Jardim - drums, vocals
- Ryan Krieger - drums, vocals

== Guest members ==
- Rubén Blades - vocals, percussion
- Los Angeles Scots Pipe Band

== Discography ==
- Bad Haggis (1998)
- Ark (2000)
- Trip (2001)
- Wine Dark Sea (2005)

== Movie soundtracks with either Bad Haggis or Eric Rigler ==
- Titanic
- Braveheart
- Austin Powers
- Troy
- Master and Commander
- Cinderella Man
