= Crossing Jordan =

American television crime drama series (2001–2007)

- Genre: Crime drama Medical drama Legal drama
- Created by: Tim Kring
- Starring: Jill Hennessy; Miguel Ferrer; Ravi Kapoor; Mahershala Ali; Ken Howard; Kathryn Hahn; Steve Valentine; Lorraine Toussaint; Ivan Sergei; Jerry O'Connell; Leslie Bibb
- Music by: Wendy Melvoin & Lisa Coleman
- Country of origin: United States
- Original language: English
- No. of seasons: 6
- No. of episodes: 117 (list of episodes)

Production
- Executive producers: Tim Kring; Dennis Hammer; Allan Arkush; Kathy McCormick; Jon Cowan; Robert L. Rovner
- Producers: Gary Glasberg; Melissa R. Byer; Andi Bushell; Jim Praytor; Treena Hancock; Jill Hennessy
- Running time: 42–44 minutes
- Production companies: Tailwind Productions; NBC Studios (2001–2004; seasons 1–3); NBC Universal Television Studio (2004–2007; seasons 4–6)

Original release
- Network: NBC
- Release: September 24, 2001 – May 16, 2007

Related
- Las Vegas

Crossing Jordan is an American crime drama television series created by Tim Kring, that aired on NBC from September 24, 2001, to May 16, 2007. It stars Jill Hennessy as Dr. Jordan Cavanaugh, a crime-solving forensic pathologist employed in the Massachusetts Office of the Chief Medical Examiner. In addition to Jordan, the show followed an ensemble cast composed of Jordan's co-workers and police detectives assigned to the various cases.

After six seasons and 117 episodes, the series was canceled by NBC on May 14, 2007, and concluded on May 16, 2007.

== Cast and characters ==
Cast members Miguel Ferrer, Kathryn Hahn, Jill Hennessy, Ken Howard, Steve Valentine, and Ravi Kapoor (left to right)

Actor	Character	Role	Seasons					
Actor	Character	Role	1	2	3	4	5	6
Jill Hennessy	Dr. Jordan Cavanaugh	Forensic Pathologist	Main	Main	Main	Main	Main	Main
Miguel Ferrer	Dr. Garrett Macy	Chief Medical Examiner	Main	Main	Main	Main	Main	Main
Ravi Kapoor	Dr. Mahesh Vijay "Bug"	Medical Examiner	Main	Main	Main	Main	Main	Main
Mahershala Ali	Dr. Trey Sanders	Medical Examiner	Main					
Ken Howard	Maximilian Cavanaugh	Jordan's father	Main	Main	Recurring	Recurring		
Kathryn Hahn	Lily Lebowski	Grief Counselor	Main	Main	Main	Main	Main	Main
Steve Valentine	Nigel Townsend	Forensic Technician	Main	Main	Main	Main	Main	Main
Lorraine Toussaint	Dr. Elaine Duchamps	Medical Examiner		Main				
Ivan Sergei	Dr. Peter Winslow	Medical Examiner		Recurring	Main			
Jerry O'Connell	Det. Woody Hoyt	Detective	Recurring	Recurring	Recurring	Main	Main	Main
Leslie Bibb	Det. Tallulah "Lu" Simmons	Detective					Main	Main

=== Main ===
- Jill Hennessy portrays Dr. Jordan Cavanaugh: A forensic pathologist in the Boston Medical Examiner's Office obsessed with solving violent crimes after her mother's murder.
- Miguel Ferrer portrays Dr. Garret Macy: The Chief Medical Examiner and Jordan's boss who deals with her erratic behavior as well as his own confused family.
- Ken Howard portrays Maximilian "Max" Cavanaugh: An ex-cop-turned-bar-owner and Jordan's father.
- Mahershala Ali (billed as Mahershalalhashbaz Ali) portrays Dr. Trey Sanders: A medical examiner working on a grant.
- Ravi Kapoor portrays Dr. "Bug" Vijay (born Mahesh Vijayaraghavensatyanaryanamurthy): A shy but intense forensic entomologist.
- Kathryn Hahn portrays Lily Lebowski: A perky intake secretary and later grief counselor.
- Steve Valentine portrays Nigel Townsend: A wise-cracking British forensic technician and self-styled criminologist.
- Lorraine Toussaint portrays Dr. Elaine Duchamps: An initially antagonistic medical examiner.
- Ivan Sergei portrays Dr. Peter Winslow: A medical examiner and recovering drug addict.
- Jerry O'Connell portrays Woodrow "Woody" Hoyt: A quirky Boston Police Department homicide detective, transplanted from Wisconsin, who works regularly with Jordan.
- Leslie Bibb portrays Tallulah "Lu" Simmons: A Boston Police Department psychologist and homicide detective romantically involved with Woody.

=== Medical Examiners ===
- Jennifer Finnigan portrays Dr. Devan Maguire: A pathology resident who occasionally butts heads with Jordan.
- Eugene Byrd portrays Dr. Sidney Trumaine: An eager-to-prove-himself medical examiner.
- Brooke Smith portrays Dr. Kate Switzer: A cantankerous medical examiner assigned to the Medical Examiner's Office by Lu.

=== Boston Police Department ===
- D. W. Moffett portrays Eddie Winslow: A dismissive homicide detective and Max Cavanaugh's final partner.
- Amy Aquino portrays Lois Carver: A no-nonsense homicide detective.
- David Monahan portrays Matt Seely: A misogynistic and insensitive detective.
- Arija Bareikis portrays Annie Capra: A homicide detective briefly partnered with Woody.
- Sandra Bernhard portrays Roz Framus: A homicide detective with a tendency to tease Dr. Vijay.
- Camille Guaty portrays Luisa Santana: A homicide detective partnered with Woody on two cases.
- Boris Kodjoe portrays Elliot Chandler: A homicide detective who worked with the Medical Examiner's Office on two occasions.

=== District Attorneys ===
- Susan Gibney portrays Renee Walcott: A no-nonsense attorney romantically involved with Garrett.
- Brian Stokes Mitchell portrays Jay Myers: An attorney who has a sexual encounter with Jordan.
- Ethan Sandler portrays Jeffrey Brandau: An assistant district attorney who becomes romantically involved with Lily and becomes the father of her daughter.
- Jeffrey Donovan portrays William Ivers: An attorney who drastically lowers the budget of the Medical Examiner's Office.

=== Civilians ===
- Wallace Shawn portrays Dr. Howard Stiles: The Medical Examiner's Office's resident psychiatrist.
- Emy Coligado portrays Emmy: An assistant in the Medical Examiner's Office.
- Alex McKenna portrays Abby Macy: Dr. Macy's estranged daughter.
- Lindsay Frost portrays Maggie Macy: Dr. Macy's ex-wife.
- Jack Laufer portrays Herman Redding: A psychiatric patient and murder suspect who claims to have knowledge about the death of Jordan's mother.
- Michael T. Weiss portrays James Horton: Jordan's illegitimate half-brother.
- Lesley Ann Warren portrays Arlene Lebowski: Lily's estranged aunt and adoptive mother.
- Brian Kimmet portrays Oliver Titleman: A young student obsessed with creating the perfect crime.
- Charles Mesure portrays J.D. Pollack: An Australian reporter romantically involved with Jordan.

== Production ==
Crossing Jordan was created by Tim Kring and was produced by Tailwind Productions in association with NBCUniversal. Singer-songwriter duo Wendy and Lisa scored the music for the show. Eric Rigler's pipes and whistles can be heard in most episodes.

In the first season, Hennessy was the only cast member visible during the opening credits, which featured Eric Rigler's arrangement of a traditional Irish tune "The Boys on the Hilltop" (a quicker tempo, but shorter version of "Reels Part One -- The Boys on the Hilltop" from the Bad Haggis CD Trip). Starting with the second season, the credits showed all the major players and used a more rock-like, less-Irish-sounding opening theme.

Crossing Jordan is set in the same fictional universe as fellow NBC series Las Vegas. In the season-four episode "What Happens in Vegas Dies in Boston", a case takes Jordan and Woody to Las Vegas, where Woody became very well-acquainted with the Montecito's casino host, Sam Marquez (Vanessa Marcil). They maintained a long-distance relationship for a while: O'Connell appeared in five episodes of Las Vegas and Vanessa Marcil appeared as Sam in two Crossing Jordan episodes.

== Reception ==
USA Today gave the show a two-star review and said, "What truly strains belief—and your viewing patience—are the absurd quirks Jordan adds to its plot and its characters to try to set itself apart." The New York Times called it "engaging and entertaining" and "Hennessy gives Jordan an appealing, loose-cannon attitude."

== Broadcast ==
Crossing Jordan premiered on September 24, 2001 on NBC. It aired on Mondays, Fridays, Sundays and finally Wednesdays for its final episodes.

The show was put on hiatus for most of the 2003–2004 season to accommodate Hennessy's real-life pregnancy. The series returned on March 9, 2004, with a shortened 13-episode season. Due to the season being broadcast out of order, the cliffhanger plotline from the season-two finale was aired as the last episode of the season instead of the first; instead, the first featured an unrelated story with a humorous subplot that paid homage to Alfred Hitchcock's 1954 film Rear Window.

Originally, the sixth season was slated for Sunday nights after the football season ended in January, but it was then scheduled to premiere on October 20, 2006, and to be on Friday nights with Medium being put into the after-football Sunday-night slot. It was scheduled to air at 8pm Eastern/Pacific and 7pm Central/Mountain, but NBC decided to avoid showing scripted programming at that hour. The season premiere was pre-empted in favor of 1 vs. 100, a game show hosted by Bob Saget. The season premiere ran on January 14, 2007, at 10pm Eastern/Pacific and 9pm Central. Beginning March 7, 2007, the show moved to a new time slot, Wednesday 9/8C where it was promoted as a female empowerment block with Medium.

=== Syndication ===
NBC tried syndicating Crossing Jordan during its second season. Reruns are often shown on A&E in the United States and Canada. It previously aired in syndication on CIN (Crime and Investigation Network). It currently airs on Start TV. In January 2021, The Roku Channel in the United States released all episodes of Crossing Jordan to stream.

=== Cancellation ===
Originally, the finale for the sixth season was promoted as a cliffhanger. A plane crash which left all of the main characters (with the exception of Lily) stranded atop a mountain with little hope of being discovered was reported to end with no resolution, as the story would pick up at the onset of a subsequent season. Once NBC decided against renewing Crossing Jordan for a seventh year, though, fans were treated to a different ending: Jordan ultimately confronts her held-in feelings for Woody and finally professes her love, and all of the characters are rescued in the final moments of the series. The ending provided fuel to rumors that producers recorded two endings to the finale: one in case the series would be renewed, and another in case the series would not be.

The series was cancelled on May 14, 2007, two days before the season six finale aired.

== Home media ==
=== Episodes and ratings ===
Season	Episodes	Originally released		Average U.S. viewers (millions)	Rank
Season	Episodes	First released	Last released	Average U.S. viewers (millions)	Rank
1	23	September 24, 2001	May 13, 2002	12.8	28
2	22	September 23, 2002	May 5, 2003	10.6	44
3	13	March 7, 2004	June 6, 2004	12.3	24
4	21	September 26, 2004	May 15, 2005	11.7	30
5	21	September 25, 2005	May 7, 2006	10.9	40
6	17	January 14, 2007	May 16, 2007	7.2	81

=== DVD releases ===
NBC announced in January 2007 that it was making progress securing music rights to allow the show to be released on DVD. (Crossing Jordan relies heavily on pop music in its soundtrack.) The first season was released on DVD on May 6, 2008, and there is no notice of substitution of music on the DVD packaging. However, as of January 2018, the latter seasons were still not available via DVD in the US. In Germany, the second season was released on DVD and Blu-ray via Koch Media on September 10, 2015. Koch Media already re-released a remastered version of the first season in May 2015.

The complete 27-disc DVD collection is available in Australia from JB HI-FI, EzyDVD, Dymocks., Sanity and Via Vision Entertainment.

DVD name	Release date	Ep No.	Additional information
The Complete First Season	May 6, 2008	23	Featurette: A Conversation with Tim Kring and Allan Arkush; Featurette: Jill Hennessy and Allan Arkush talk about Jordan; Commentary on Select Episodes; Deleted Scenes
