= Eric Rigler =

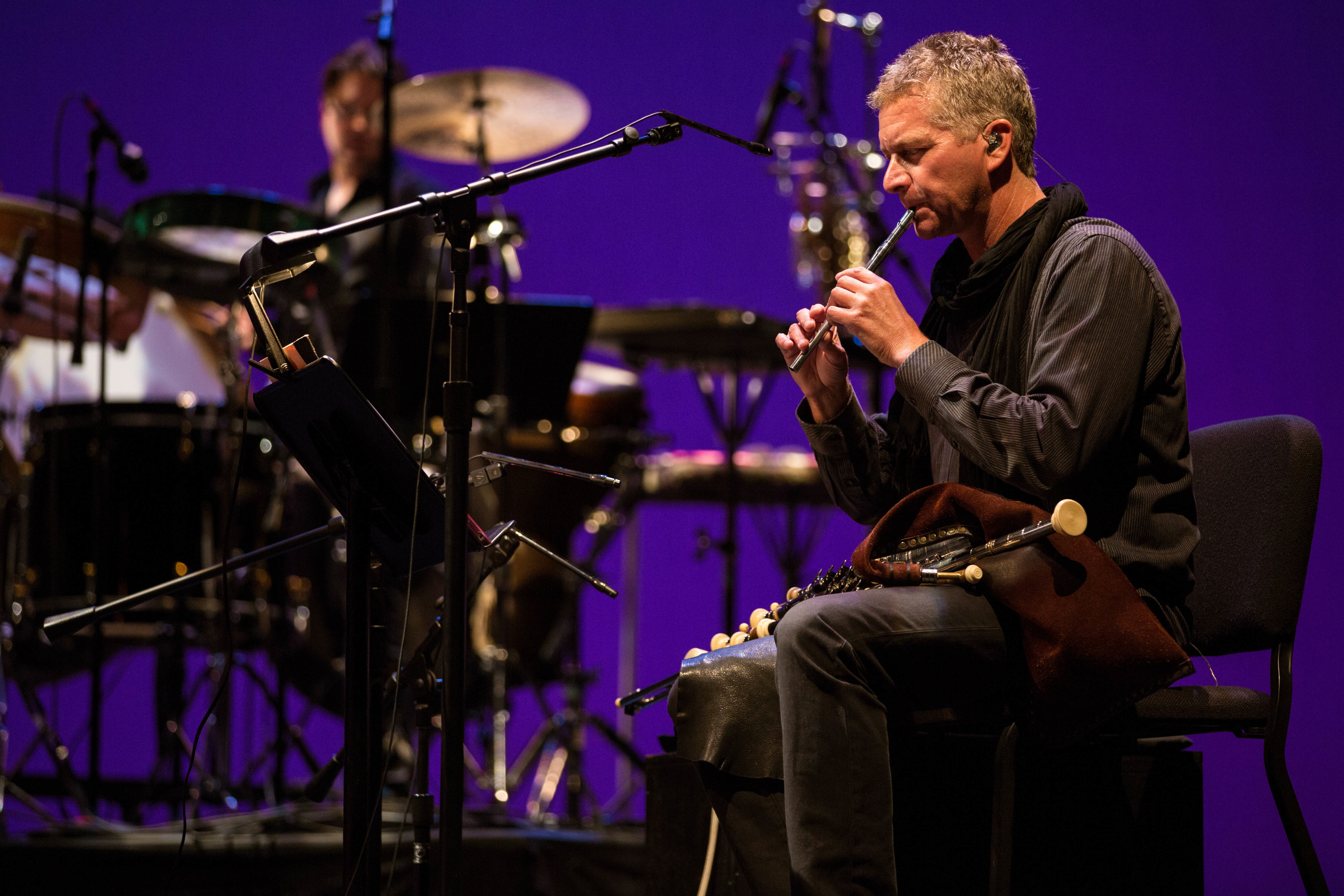
- Eric Rigler performing live in 2012

Background information
- Born: Eric Rigler
- Genres: Folk, Celtic, Celtic rock
- Occupation: Musician
- Instruments: Uilleann pipes, Tin Whistle, Bagpipes

Eric Rigler is an American player of the Uilleann pipes, Great Highland Bagpipes, and tin whistle. He performs as a solo artist and with the band Bad Haggis, and has been featured on a number of movie soundtracks. He has been described as "the most recorded bagpiper of all time". He has been playing all forms of bagpipes and tin whistles since he was a child, performing solo, with bagpipe bands and other musical groups.

Rigler grew up in Los Angeles and began taking bagpipe lessons at age 7. He lived and studied in Scotland for 10 years before returning to Los Angeles.

He has been featured playing Great Highland bagpipes, Uilleann pipes and tin whistle on numerous movie soundtracks, including Titanic, Million Dollar Baby, Road to Perdition, Braveheart, Cinderella Man, Robots, Austin Powers: The Spy Who Shagged Me, The Prince of Egypt, and Master and Commander: The Far Side of the World. His music was frequently used on the NBC show Crossing Jordan, and his arrangement of an Irish tune was used as its opening theme during the first season. He was also featured on the USA Network in the 2006 Victoria's Secret fashion show, playing the bagpipes for the Highland romance sequence and for the AFI Lifetime Achievement celebration for Sean Connery.

Rigler played "Amazing Grace" at former President Ronald Reagan's funeral in 2004.

Rigler plays pipes and whistles in the Celtic world fusion band he formed, Bad Haggis, based in Southern California. He occasionally performs with Los Angeles–based rock band the Young Dubliners. Rigler wrote the tunes "The B-52" and "Walking the Plank", which are performed by the World Pipe Band Champion Field Marshal Montgomery Pipe Band of Northern Ireland, the Los Angeles Scottish Pipe Band, and other top level bagpipe bands throughout the world.

On February 12, 2013, San Bernardino County Sheriff's Detective Jeremiah MacKay was killed on duty near Big Bear, California in a firefight. Rigler played a special tribute at his funeral on February 21, 2013, along with 130 other bagpipers. MacKay was the department's official bagpiper, who had performed at the funerals of other officers.

In 2016, Rigler performed on Dream Theater's song "The X Aspect," on their album The Astonishing, marking the first use of bagpipes in a Dream Theater recording.
