= Dreaming the Dark =

1982 book by Starhawk

Dreaming the Dark: Magic, Sex, and Politics
- Author: Starhawk
- Language: English
- Subject: Spirituality
- Published: 1982
- Publication place: United States
- Media type: Print

Dreaming the Dark: Magic, Sex, and Politics is a 1982 book by Starhawk about magic, spirituality, politics, ethics, and sex.

== Editions ==
- Starhawk (1997). Dreaming the Dark: Magic, Sex, and Politics (15th anniversary ed.). Boston: Beacon Press. ISBN 0-8070-1037-5.
- Starhawk (1988). Dreaming the Dark: Magic, Sex, and Politics (New ed.). Boston: Beacon Press. ISBN 0-8070-1025-1.
- Starhawk (1982). Dreaming the Dark: Magic, Sex, and Politics (Paperback ed.). Boston: Beacon Press. ISBN 0-8070-1001-4.
- Starhawk (1982). Dreaming the Dark: Magic, Sex, and Politics. Boston: Beacon Press. ISBN 0-8070-1000-6.
