= Starhawk =

American feminist and writer (born 1951)

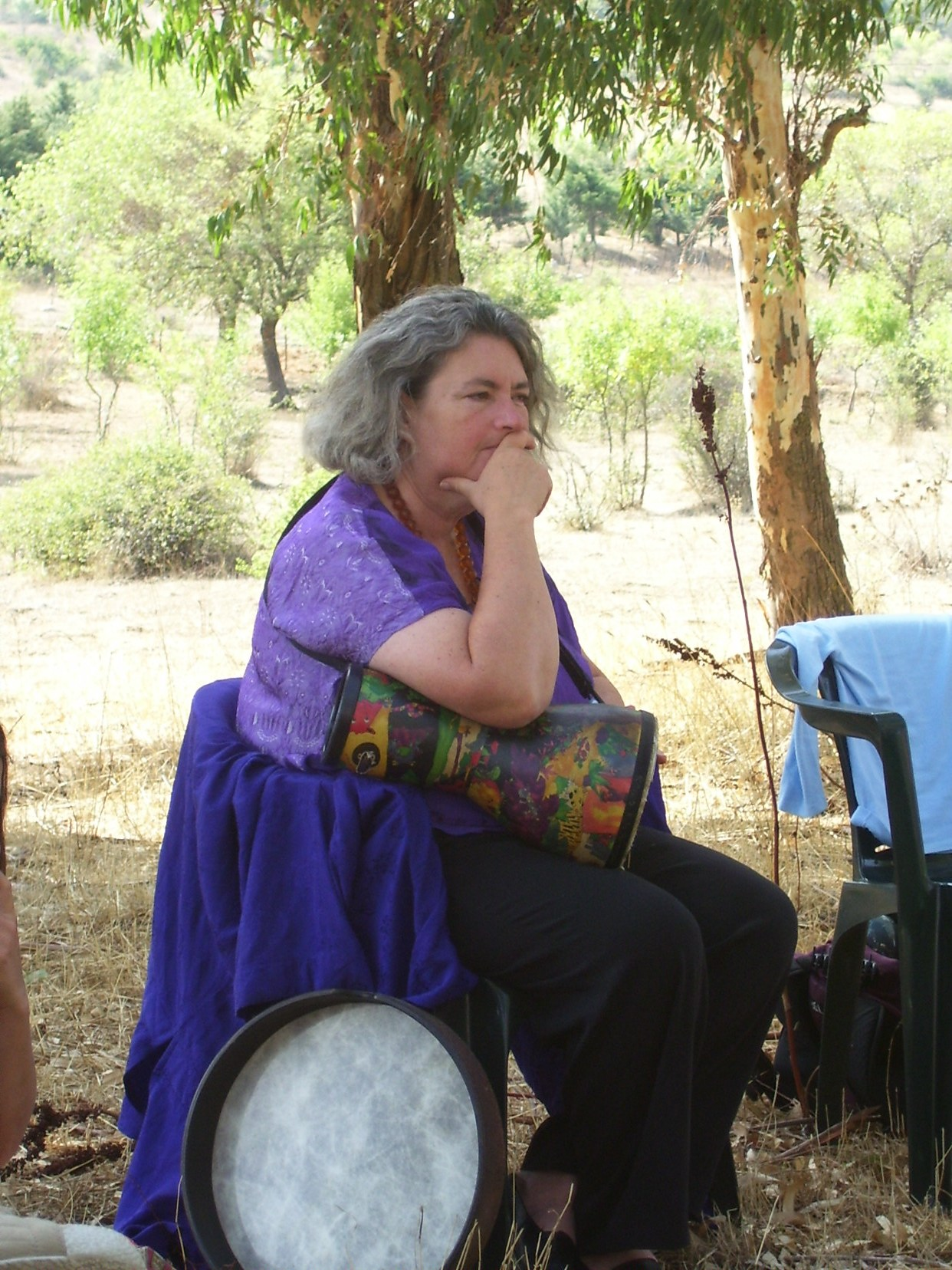
- Starhawk at a Sicilian workshop in 2007
- Born: Miriam Simos; June 17, 1951 (age 75); Saint Paul, Minnesota, U.S.
- Education: UCLA (B.A.); Antioch University West (M.A.)
- Notable work: The Spiral Dance; Dreaming the Dark
- Spouse: David Miller
- Awards: Samuel Goldwyn Writing Award
- Website: starhawk.org

Starhawk (born Miriam Simos on June 17, 1951) is an American feminist and writer. She is known as a theorist of feminist neopaganism and ecofeminism. In 2013, she was listed in Watkins' Mind Body Spirit magazine as one of the 100 Most Spiritually Influential Living People.

== Early life ==
Starhawk was born in 1951 in Saint Paul, Minnesota. Her father, Jack Simos, died when she was five. Her mother, Bertha Claire Goldfarb Simos, was a professor of social work at UCLA. Both of her parents were the children of Jewish immigrants from Ukraine.

During high school, she and feminist Christina Hoff Sommers were best friends. Starhawk received a BA in Fine Arts from UCLA. In 1973, whilst a graduate student in film there, she won the Samuel Goldwyn Writing Award for her novel, A Weight of Gold, a story about Venice, California, where she then lived. She received an MA in Psychology, with a concentration in feminist therapy, from Antioch University West in 1982.

== The Spiral Dance ==
Following her years at UCLA, after a failed attempt to become a fiction writer in New York City, Starhawk returned to California. She became active in the Neopagan community in the San Francisco Bay Area, and trained with Victor Anderson, founder of the Feri Tradition of witchcraft, and with Zsuzsanna Budapest, a feminist separatist involved in Dianic Wicca.

She wrote a book, The Spiral Dance, on Goddess religion, which she finished in 1977 but was unable to publish at first. Feminist religious scholar Carol P. Christ included an article on witchcraft and the Goddess movement in the anthology Womanspirit Rising (1979). Christ put Starhawk in touch with an editor at Harper & Row, who eventually published the book.

First published in 1979, The Spiral Dance: A Rebirth of the Ancient Religion of the Great Goddess became a best-selling book about neopagan belief and practice. A 10th-anniversary edition was published in 1989, followed by a 20th-anniversary edition in 1999. The original text of The Spiral Dance was left largely intact for these editions, expanded primarily by introductions and commentaries reflecting on the book's origins, the rituals described, and the evolution of the author's beliefs and practices. Since its publication, The Spiral Dance has become a classic resource on Wicca and modern witchcraft, spiritual feminism, the Goddess movement, and ecofeminism. The work is distinguished by its visionary mysticism, "broad philosophy of harmony with nature," and ecstatic consciousness.

== Beliefs ==
Starhawk believes that the Earth is a living entity, and that faith-based activism can reconnect oneself to basic human needs. She posits core religious values of community and self-sacrifice as important to eco-pagan movements, as well as the broader environmental justice movement.

She advocates combining social justice issues with a nature-based spirituality that begins with spending time in the natural world, saying that doing so "...can open up your understanding on deeper and more subtle levels where the natural world will speak to you."

Starhawk's activism is deeply rooted in an anti-war philosophy, as she believes that war teaches one to see people culturally different than themselves as inhuman and dangerous. She has written extensively on activism, including advice for activist organizers, examinations of white privilege within radical communities, and calls for an intersectionality of fighting oppression that includes spirituality, eco-consciousness, and sexual and gender liberation.

== Feminism ==
Starhawk's feminism and spirituality are closely interconnected. Her ecofeminism links life-giving Mother Nature with the life-giving of women through birth, as well as the link between ecological destruction and patriarchal oppression under male-dominated Western political economies.

She calls for a reconceptualization of the way we think about power that is different from what she posits as our typical understanding of 'power over' others, and believes that patriarchal systems of oppression are dying out and will be replaced by more egalitarian structures that have existed previously with many women in positions of power, including as priestesses, poets, healers, singers, and seers. Such matrilineal lineages, she argues, have been erased from history because of their "political implications."

Starhawk argues that our patriarchal culture of domination has confused the erotic with domination and violence. Sexuality, she says, "...is sacred because through it we make a connection with another self — but it is misused and perverted when it becomes an arena of power-over, a means of treating another — or oneself — as an object." Such analyses of gendered power relations are explored in her books Webs of Power: Notes from the Global Uprising (2003) and Truth or Dare: Encounters with Power, Authority and Mystery (1988). In the latter, she links the rise of kinship to patriarchal domination, and traces a psychology of liberation in analyzing an oppressor she argues is embedded deeply in all of us, the 'Self-hater.' She is interested in how such oppressions can be reformed into new sources of power, particularly amongst women, that arise innately and reject dominion over others.

Her feminist writings have been used to analyze the differences between mainstream rhetoric and feminist rhetoric, particularly in relation to her motive of writing rhetoric as revealing immanent truths rather than being utilized for persuasion. She views this latter purpose of mainstream rhetoric as adhering to patriarchal logic, and her vision of 'empowered action' – which involves rejecting the tenets of the oppressive system and then openly challenging them – attempts to transform persuasive mainstream rhetoric to immanent feminist rhetoric.

== Projects ==
In 1979, partly to commemorate the publication of The Spiral Dance, Starhawk and her friends staged a public celebration of the neopagan variant of the Irish Fire Festival Samhain (Halloween) incorporating an actual spiral dance. This group became the Reclaiming Collective, and their annual Spiral Dance ritual now draws hundreds of participants.

Starhawk continues to work with Reclaiming, a tradition of Witchcraft that she co-founded. This now-international organization offers classes, workshops, camps, and public rituals in earth-based spirituality, with the goal to "unify spirit and politics".

She also works internationally as a trainer in nonviolence and direct action, and as an activist within the peace movement, women's movement, environmental movement, permaculture, and anti-globalization movement. She travels and teaches widely in North America, Europe and the Middle East, giving lectures and workshops.

She was influential in the decision by the Unitarian Universalist Association to include earth-centered traditions among their sources of faith. She led numerous workshops for, and was an active member of The Covenant of Unitarian Universalist Pagans (CUUPS), an interest group of Unitarians honoring goddess-based, earth-centered, tribal, and pagan spiritual paths.

Starhawk has taught in several San Francisco Bay Area colleges and universities, including John F. Kennedy University, Antioch University West, the Institute of Culture and Creation Spirituality at Holy Names University, and Wisdom University. She is presently adjunct faculty at the California Institute of Integral Studies, and is currently affiliated with United for Peace and Justice, the RANT trainers' collective, Earth Activist Training, and other groups.

Starhawk has written a number of books, and has also contributed works in other media. Her works have appeared in translation in Spanish, French, German, Danish, Dutch, Italian, Portuguese, Polish, Czech, Greek, Japanese, and Burmese.

== Written works ==
=== Non-fiction ===
- The Spiral Dance: A Rebirth of the Ancient Religion of the Great Goddess (1979, 1989, 1999)
- Dreaming the Dark: Magic, Sex, and Politics (1982, 1988, 1997)
- Truth or Dare: Encounters with Power, Authority, and Mystery (1988)
- Webs of Power: Notes from the Global Uprising (2003)
- The Earth Path: Grounding Your Spirit in the Rhythms of Nature (2004)
- The Empowerment Manual: A Guide for Collaborative Groups (2011)

==== As coauthor ====
- With M. Macha Nightmare and the Reclaiming Collective: The Pagan Book of Living and Dying: Practical Rituals, Prayers, Blessings, and Meditations on Crossing Over (1997)
- With Anne Hill and Diane Baker: Circle Round: Raising Children in the Goddess Tradition (1998)
- With Hilary Valentine: The Twelve Wild Swans: A Journey Into Magic, Healing, and Action (2000)

=== Fiction ===
- The Fifth Sacred Thing (1993)
- Walking to Mercury (1997) (prequel to The Fifth Sacred Thing)
- The Last Wild Witch (2009) (children's book)
- City of Refuge (2015) (sequel to The Fifth Sacred Thing)

== Filmography ==
Starhawk has contributed to films:

- Signs Out of Time: The Story of Archaeologist Marija Gimbutas
- Goddess Remembered
- The Burning Times
- Full Circle
- Permaculture: The Growing Edge (2010)
- United Natures (2013) directed by Peter Charles Downey

== Discography ==
She participated in the Reclaiming CDs Chants: Ritual Music, and recorded the guided meditation Way to the Well.

== Other media ==
On YouTube, Starhawk speaks on spirituality and activism at the Unitarian Universalist Association (UUA). She also wrote the call-to-action for the women's peace organization Code Pink.

== Personal life ==
Starhawk married Edwin Rahsman in 1977. They subsequently divorced. She is currently married to David Miller, and they live in San Francisco. Starhawk also resides partly in Sonoma, California.

Starhawk is bisexual, and has also commented that her sexuality is fluid and "has something to do with a deep reluctance to be pinned down." Her writing and activism promote equality for people of all sexual orientations and gender identities.

== See also ==
- Modern paganism and New Age
