= Croft No. 5 =

Croft No. 5 are a Scottish world music–Celtic fusion band, composed of accordionist John Somerville, guitarist Spad Reid, drummer Paul Jennings, bassist Duncan Lyall, fiddler Innes Watson, and Misha Somerville on whistles. The band was started in 1998 with original bassist Somhairle MacDonald and the band was soon joined by Adam Sutherland. Both Sutherland and MacDonald left to pursue other projects in 2003. Croft No. 5 toured all over the world from New York to the Czech Republic. Croft No. 5 split at the end of the summer of 2006 following disagreements over the musical direction of the band, but reformed in 2017 for concerts at Glenelg Village Hall and Celtic Connections 2018.

Croft No. 5 released two studio albums, Attention All Personnel (2001) and Talk of the Future (2004). They also produced an EP in conjunction with Scottish rapper Damaged Goodz in 2004. Before splitting they had recorded two new tracks, "Out of Line" and "Crash", which were received well.
