= Roving Crows =

Irish band

Roving crows
- Origin: Kildare/Donegal, Ireland
- Genres: Celtic fusion, folk rock
- Years active: 2009–present
- Members: Caitlin Barret; Paul O'Neill; Jim Smith; Laurence Aldridge
- Past members: Loz Shaw; Tim Downes-Hall; Joe Ball; Josh Balen; Mark Miletich; Greg Wilson-Copp; Tim Tolhurst
- Website: http://www.rovingcrows.com

Roving Crows are a four-piece Irish folk rock band, currently based between Donegal, Ireland and Worcestershire, England. Since forming in 2009, they have released three albums and received a number of awards.

== History ==
=== Formation and self-titled demo ===
Singer-Songwriter Paul O'Neill and fiddle player Caitlin Barrett first performed as a duo in 2007, under the name Elysian. In 2009 they decided to expand the line up and change the name to The Roving Crows (the word 'The' was later dropped from the name). The band went through several line-up changes early in its life. A self-titled demo album was recorded and released in 2010 with John David at Berryhill Studios with the addition of Mark Miletich on double bass and Phil Hall on drums.

Greg Wilson-Copp joined Roving Crows in 2010 on trumpet, bringing Ska and Soul influences to the sound. By this point the rhythm section had changed to Joe Ball on bass guitar and Josh Balen on drums, and in 2011 this line-up self-recorded and released an EP previewing the new musical style since the debut album.

Tim Tolhurst was recruited on drums after Josh Balen stepped down in 2011, bringing his jazz influenced percussion to the group. In the same year they won two Irish Music Awards: Top Celtic Rock Band and Top Fiddle Player, accredited to them by the Irish Music Association.

=== Bacchanalia (2011) ===
In late 2011 Roving Crows went into Rockfield Studios to record their debut album with producer Nick Brine (who also worked with acts such as Ash, Oasis, Bruce Springsteen, Seasick Steve and The Darkness). Bacchanalia was released on 17 March 2012 with a release party at Gloucester Guildhall and an ensuing tour of the United Kingdom and Ireland including performances at Cambridge Folk Festival, Trowbridge Village Pump Festival, Lakefest, Ireby Folk Festival, Wychwood Festival and Cheltenham Jazz Festival.

In 2012 they won Best Folk Act at the Exposure Music Awards as well as being noticed by both national and regional BBC radio stations, including airplay on Mike Harding's Folk Show and The Paul O'Grady Show

=== Deliberate Distractions (2013) ===
After spending much of 2012 without a bass player, Loz Shaw joined Roving Crows in October 2012 whilst the band were half way through the writing process for their second album. A self-recorded EP simply entitled EP 2013 was released in February 2013 with four new tracks including a live recording of Roving Crows' arrangement of "Music for a Found Harmonium". Roving Crows returned to Rockfield Studios in March 2013 to record Deliberate Distractions, again with producer Nick Brine. The album was released on 4 November 2013, attracting 4- and 5- star reviews from publications such as The Financial Times, R2 Magazine and Maverick Magazine. The band was awarded 'Band of the Year 2013' in the 2014 Fatea Music Awards, as well as 'Best Live Band' in the 2014 Spiral Earth awards

=== Live Distractions (2014) ===
As a follow-up to Deliberate Distractions, a 15-track live album was recorded at the Watson Hall, Tewkesbury on 21 December 2013. It was released in a limited press at the St. Paddy's Day Extravaganza on 15 March 2014 at the Gloucester Guildhall, and digitally through Bandcamp on the same date.

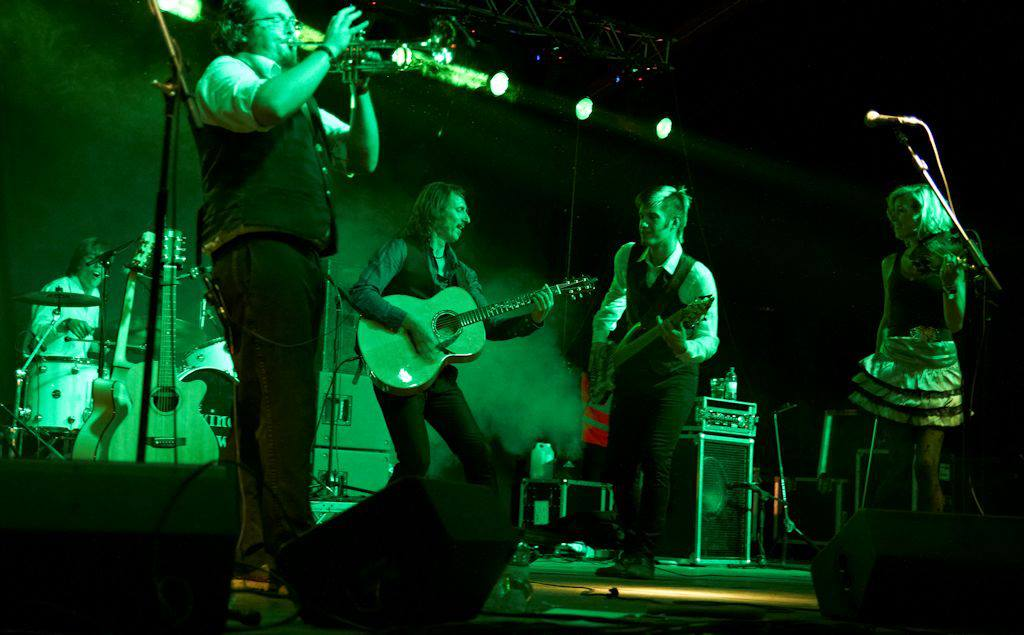
Roving Crows, 10 August 2013

=== Up Heaval (2015) ===
Up Heaval is the five-track EP released on 14 March 2015 to coincide with their final concert with Greg Wilson-Copp and Tim Tolhurst. Tolhurst provided session drums on several tracks on the EP, although the use of electronic percussion and synthesizers was prevalent for the first time. The band continued as a trio for several months until recruiting Tim Downes-Hall to play a variety of percussion outside of the constrictions of a traditional drum kit.

=== Bury Me Naked (2017) ===
After two years of constant touring including breakthrough tours in France, there was increasing demand for new music. Recording of the group's third album began in late 2016. This was the first recording to feature Tim Downes-Hall on percussion as well as being the first self-recorded album from the group, with Loz Shaw bass and vocals also handling the recording and production. Many different locations were used for the recording of the large number of layered sounds that feature on the album. Bury Me Naked was released on 8 April 2017 with a launch party at Gloucester Guildhall.

=== Lockdown (2020) ===
During the COVID-19 pandemic of 2020, the band, like all musicians worldwide had all their gigs and tours cancelled. They decided in this time to be productive and remotely record a 5-track EP. Each member recorded their own parts and sent them to Jim Smith who then produced and mixed the EP. Lockdown consisted of two new tracks and three revamped tracks featuring the foundation line-up of Paul O'Neill and Caitlin Barrett and new additions Jim Smith on bass guitar and Laurence Aldridge on drums. Lockdown was released on 17 July 2020 on CD and online streaming platforms.

=== Awaken (2022) ===
Awaken was created from both sides of the Irish Sea – recorded by Simon O’Reilly in Doolin, County Clare, Ireland and mixed by their own Jim Smith in Great Malvern, England. The writing and arrangements were completed by Caitlin and Paul on the west coast of Ireland, in order to further encapsulate the essence of the wild Atlantic represented in the new tracks. It continues the themes and raw feel of Roving Crows' last album, Bury Me Naked, focusing on the band's personal outlook on life. All songs are self-penned with the exception of two sets of traditional tunes, "Phoenix" and "Rise". Awaken was released on 4 March 2022 with a launch party at Malvern Cube and followed by a tour across the UK.

== Sound ==
Due to differing musical backgrounds between band members, the band's musical influences have varied widely throughout the band's history and have included traditional Celtic music, Klezmer, tribal house, ska, Latino, jazz, reggae, country, Americana and traditional folk music.

== Current members ==
- Paul O'Neill (lead vocals, acoustic guitar, electric guitar)
- Caitlin Barret (fiddle, vocals)
- Jim Smith (bass guitar, electric guitar, vocals)
- Laurence Aldridge (drums, vocals)

== Previous members ==
- Loz Shaw (fretless bass, vocals)
- Tim Downes-Hall (percussion)
- Greg Wilson-Copp (trumpet, vocals)
- Tim Tolhurst (drums, vocals)
- Joe Ball (bass)
- Josh Balen (drums)
- Mark Miletich (double bass)
- Phil Hall (drums)
