= Alessandro Avellis =

Italian film director

Alessandro Avellis (born 30 September 1975) is an Italian film director.

Alessandro Avellis studied film direction in Rome. Since 2000 he lives in Paris. He directed some short films selected and awarded in several international film festivals, of which Lovstori, selected in 1996 at the Sacher festival of Nanni Moretti, and More of Paul, released on DVD by Antiprod. He wrote and directed in 2005 his first feature film, My Super 8 Season, freely inspired by historical events (DVD Antiprod). Then, he made two documentaries: The Revolution of Desire (DVD Hystérie Prod), about the FHAR, the French feminist and gay liberation movement in the 70s, and The Vatican Rules, about the reactionary influence of the Roman Church. In 2008 he directed "Transseizième", a documentary about Pascale Ourbih, a transsexual actress, first-time candidate for the French Green Party in the wealthiest and conservative Parisian district.

== Filmography ==
- Paname (France, 2010, 73').
- Transseizième (documentary, France, 2008 – 16’)
- The Vatican Rules (Les règles du Vatican, documentary, France/Italy, 2007 – 80’)
- The Revolution of Desire (La révolution du désir, documentary, France, 2006 – 80’ / 52’)
- My Super 8 Season (Ma saison Super 8, France, 2005 – 74’)

=== Short films ===
- The boy and the eagle (Le garçon et l’aigle - France, 2003 - 12’) Audience Award, «Question de genre» Lille.
- More of Paul (Plus de Paul - France, 2002 - 8’)
- Parole nella città (Italy, 2000 - 12’) Best Image Award, «La cittadella del corto» Rome 2000.
- Armida (Italy, 1999 - 18’) Best actress Award, «Vedo corto» Bari 1999.
- ABC (Italy, 1998 - 12’)
- Lovstori (Italy, 1996 - 9’) Jury Prize, «Opere nuove» Bolzano 1996.

== Festival screenings ==
«Festival de films g&l» Paris 2005 (France), «Festival du film g&l» Brussels 2006 (Belgium), «Turin G&L film festival Da Sodoma a Hollywood» Torino 2006 (Italy), «Vues d’en Face» Grenoble 2006 (France), «Journées du cinéma g&l» Rouen 2006 (France), «Image+Nation» Montreal 2006 (Canada), «NewFest» New York 2007 (USA), «Austin g&l Int’l Film Festival» Austin 2007 (USA) «Reel Affirmations» Washington 2007 (USA), Corona Cork Film Festival (Ireland), «Reeling In’l G&L Film Festival» Chicago (USA), «Mix Brasil» São Paulo, Brasília, Rio de Janeiro (Brazil), «Festival de films g&l» Paris 2006 (France), «Festival Reflets» Marseille 2007 (France), «Université d’été homosexuelle» Marseille 2007, «Get Bent» Manchester 2007 (England), «Festival du film militant» Aubagne 2007 (France), «Pink Screens» Brussels 2007 (Belgium), «Turin G&L film festival Da Sodoma a Hollywood» Turin 2008 (Italy), «Festival Reflets» Marseille 2008 (France), «Image+Nation» Montreal 2007 (Canada), «Festival Désirs Désirs» Tours 2008 (France), «Festival Confrontation – The 70s cinema» Perpignan 2008 (France), «D’un genre à l’autre» Nice 2008 (France), «Mardi Gras Film Festival» Sydney 2008 (Australia), «London L&G Film Festival» London 2008 (UK), «Melbourne Queer Film Festival» Melbourne 2008 (Australia), «Outfest» Los Angeles 2008 (Etats-Unis), «Q! Film Festival» Jakarta, Bali, Surabaya 2008 (Indonesia).

== DVD ==
- Paname, Water Bearer Films - USA 2010.
- Ma saison Super 8, Water Bearer Films - USA 2009.
- La révolution du désir, Hystérie Prod - France 2007.
- Ma saison Super 8, Antiprod - France 2006.
- Plus de Paul, Antiprod - France 2003.
