= Christian Marazzi =

Swiss author

- Born: 1951 (age 74–75); Lugano, Switzerland
- Occupations: Economist, Author

Christian Marazzi (born 1951) is a Swiss economist and author.

== Biography ==
He was born in Lugano, Switzerland in 1951.

== Education ==
He graduated in political science from the University of Padua.

He completed his master's degree in economics at the London School of Economics.

He completed his Ph.D. in economics at the City University of London.

== Career ==
He has held positions at the University of Lausanne, Padua, New York and Geneva, and is currently Professor and Research Director of Socio-Economics at the Scuola Universitaria della Svizzera Italiana.

== Bibliography ==
His notable books include:

- The Violence of Financial Capitalism
- Capital and Language: From the New Economy to the War Economy
- Capital and Affects: The Politics of the Language Economy
- Autonomia: Post Political Politics
