= The Crossing (band) =

- Origin: Chicago, Illinois
- Genres: Celtic, folk, Christian,
- Years active: 1984–present
- Label: Grrr
- Members: Tony Krogh; Mark Hall; Jennifer Ingerson; Hilde Bialach; Eric Clayton
- Past members: Mike Baznik; Patrick Peterson
- Website: grrrrecords.com/crossing

The Crossing are an American traditional Celtic music band from Chicago, Illinois. Formed in 1984, they have released seven studio albums, Look Both Ways (1988), Rise and Go (1990), Dancing at the Crossroads (1993), Dochas: Hope (1996), The Court of a King: A Celtic Christmas Celebration (1998), Standing Stones (2002), and Baile (Home) (2010). They released these albums with Grrr Records.

== Background ==
The Crossing formed in Chicago, Illinois, in 1984 by front man Tony Krogh. Originally a bluegrass band, after some member changes in 1985 they switched to traditional Celtic. Tony teamed up with Pat Peterson and together wrote most of the music and lyrics. Fiddle player Jennifer Ingerson, flute player Mark Hall, and guitarist Mike Baznik rounded out the ensemble, with each member adding creative input and vocal harmonies. They put out their first album Look Both Ways in 1988. In 1989 they asked cellist Hilde Bialach to join, and the group would remain unchanged for 10 years.

Albums with this lineup include

1990 - Rise and Go, which would be paired as a double album with Look Both Ways in 1998.

1993 - Dancing at the Crossroads.

1996 - Dochas (Hope)

1998 - In The Court of a King.A Celtic Christmas Celebration

In 1999, Pat Peterson left the band amicably to pursue other interests. Since Pat was the main player of bodhran and bones, the band had to decide whether or not to find a replacement, and opted to have Baznik and Hall learn how to play bodhran. Hall also learned bones. They played their last show with Peterson at Cornerstone Festival 1999. They continued as a five-member band for another three years and released Standing Stones in 2002.

In February 2002 Baznik announced he was leaving the band but committed to finishing the album, which was released in July. They played their final show with Baznik at Cornerstone Festival 2002.

They asked Eric Clayton to join in Fall 2002. Clayton played guitar and was familiar with percussion, but was unfamiliar with the Celtic style, and had to learn bouzouki and bodhran, while also learning the lyricsk of the Standing Stones album so they could tour. They eventually released Baile (Home) in 2010, and are working on their eighth album as of fall 2019.

Current members:

Tony Krogh - founder, front man, lead and background vocals, Highland Pipes, Uilleann pipes, small pipes, guitar, bouzouki, bodhran, whistles, banjo, mandolin, didgeridoo

Jennifer Ingerson - Fiddle, vocals

Mark Hall - Flute, whistles, harp, bodhran, bones, lap dulcimer, vocals.

Hilde Bialach - Cello, lead and background vocals, keyboards, guitar

Eric Clayton - Guitar, bouzouki, bodhran, djembe, vocals

Past Members

Pat Peterson - Whistles, bodhran, bones, vocals

Mike Baznik - Guitar, bouzouki, banjo, vocals

== Music history ==
The band's first recording, Look Both Ways, was released in 1988, while their second studio album, Rise and Go, was released in 1990, both would later be re-released by Grrr Records in a combined package in 1998. Their third album, Dancing at the Crossroads, was released in 1993, from Grrr Records. The group's fourth studio album, Dochas: Hope, was released in 1996, with Grrr Records. Their fifth studio album, The Court of a King: A Celtic Christmas Celebration, was released in 1998, by Grrr Records. The sixth album, Standing Stones, was released by Grrr Records in 2002. Their seventh studio album, Baile (Home), was released in 2010, from Grrr Records.

== Discography ==
Studio Albums

- Look Both Ways (1988, independent, 1998, Grrr)
- Rise and Go (1990, independent, 1998, Grrr)
- Dancing at the Crossroads (1993, Grrr)
- Dochas: Hope (1996, Grrr)
- The Court Of A King: A Celtic Christmas Celebration (1998, Grrr)
- Standing Stones (2002, Grrr)
- Baile (Home)' (2010, Grrr)
