= Feri Tradition =

Modern pagan tradition

The Feri Tradition is an American neo-pagan tradition related to Neopagan witchcraft. It was founded in the West Coast of the United States between the 1950s and 1960s by Victor Henry Anderson and his wife, Cora Anderson. Practitioners have described it as an ecstatic tradition. Strong emphasis is placed on sensual experience and awareness, including sexual mysticism, which is not limited to heterosexual expression.

== History ==
Anderson met Cora Ann Cremeans in Bend, Oregon, in 1944; they married three days later, on 3 May, claiming that they had encountered each other many times before in the astral realm. Born in Nyota, Alabama, in January 1915, Cora had been exposed to folk magic practices from childhood; reputedly, her Irish grandfather was a "root doctor" who was known among locals as the "druid". The Andersons claimed that one of their first acts after their marriage was the erection of an altar. The following year, a son was born, and they named him Victor Elon, with the latter being the Hebrew word for oak; Cora stated that she had received the name in a dream. After the birth, a ritual was held to dedicate the infant to the Goddess. In 1948, the family moved to Niles, California, later that year purchasing a home in San Leandro. There, Anderson became a member of the Alameda Lodge of the Fraternal Order of Eagles, and he subsequently remained so for forty years. Victor earned his living as a musician, playing the accordion at events, while Cora worked as a hospital cook. It has been claimed that Anderson could speak Hawaiian, Spanish, Creole, Greek, Italian, and Gothic.

In the mid-1950s Victor and Cora read Witchcraft Today, a 1954 book by English Wiccan Gerald Gardner, with Cora claiming that Victor corresponded with Gardner for a time. The Pagan studies scholar Chas S. Clifton has suggested that the Andersons used Gardner's work as a "style guide" for the development of their own tradition of modern Pagan Witchcraft. Similarly, Kelly stated that the Andersons' tradition "began to more and more resemble that of the Gardnerians" as the couple learned more about the latter, adopting elements from it. Anderson was in correspondence with the Italian-American Wiccan Leo Martello, who encouraged Anderson to found his own coven. Circa 1960, the Andersons founded a coven, naming it Mahealani, after the Hawaiian word for the full moon. Throughout the late 1950s and early 1960s, the Andersons initiated a number of individuals into the coven. One of these was Gwydion Pendderwen, a friend of their son who shared their interest in the esoteric. Pendderwen contributed to the development of what came to be known as the Feri tradition, with some members of the lineage viewing him as one of its co-founders, along with Victor and Cora. Pendderwen noted that he had first met the family when, aged thirteen, he got into a fistfight with Victor Elon, although the two later became friends. Pendderwen was particularly influenced by Welsh mythology, and on a visit to Britain he spent time with the Alexandrian Wiccans Alex Sanders and Stewart Farrar, subsequently introducing various Alexandrian elements into Feri. In the early 1970s, the Andersons established a new coven with Pendderwen and his initiate, Alison Harlow. After Pendderwen married, his wife also joined this coven, although it disbanded in 1974.

=== Andersons' teaching ===
Over the next four decades, the Andersons would initiate between twenty-five and thirty people into their tradition. Anderson has been described as the "founding teacher" and the "seminal voice" of the Feri tradition. The original word that the Andersons used for their tradition was Vicia, which Cora was known to say was Italian. She added that "the name Fairy became accidentally attached to our tradition because Victor so often mentioned that word in speaking of nature spirits and Celtic magic.” Early initiates alternately spelled the name of the tradition as Fairy, Faery, or Faerie, although Anderson began using the spelling Feri during the 1990s to more easily differentiate it from other Wiccan traditions of the same or similar names; not all practitioners followed his example. Cora claimed that Feri was the word's original spelling, adding that it meant "the things of magic". Anderson also referred to it as the Pictish tradition. In their writing, the Andersons mixed terminology adopted from Huna, Gardnerian Wicca, and Vodou, believing that all reflected the same underlying magico-religious tapestry. It drew heavily upon the huna system developed by Max Freedom Long. According to one Feri initiate, Corvia Blackthorn:

The Andersons' teaching method was very informal. There were no classes in an academic sense, only conversations and the occasional ritual, usually followed by a home-cooked meal. Discussions with Victor were non-linear and overflowing with information. Someone once aptly remarked that talking to Victor was like to trying to drink from a fire hose. Often the connecting threads and underlying patterns in the information didn't become apparent until later on. There was also a non-verbal component to Victor's teaching. He was a true shaman, and had the ability to shift the consciousness of his students on a level well below the surface of conversation.

According to Kelly:

Studying with Victor presented some unusual problems. He demanded as much respect as any working-class grandfather might. One could ask for clarification, but to even hint that one disagreed with him, or worse yet, to contradict him, would result in an immediate and permanent order to leave. One was tempted to ask such forbidden questions because Victor lived in mythic time and was totally uninterested in other people's concepts of logic or consistency;... Another student told me that when Victor read a new book and believed it was true, then he considered it to have always been true and would rethink his history accordingly.

According to one initiate, Jim Schuette, Anderson was "a taskmaster. He took pride in testing his students." One of those initiated into the Andersons' Feri tradition was Starhawk, who incorporated ideas from the Feri tradition when creating Reclaiming. She also included aspects from it in her 1979 book, The Spiral Dance, including mention of the Iron and Pearl Pentagram and the three souls, all of which originated within Feri. Another prominent initiate was Gabriel Carillo (Caradoc ap Cador), who in the late 1970s developed a written body of Feri teachings, and began offering paid classes in the tradition in the 1980s, generating the Bloodrose lineage; doing so generated controversy among Feri initiates, with critics believing that it was morally wrong to charge for teaching.
