= Front homosexuel d'action révolutionnaire =

Radical 1970s union between lesbian feminists and gay male activists

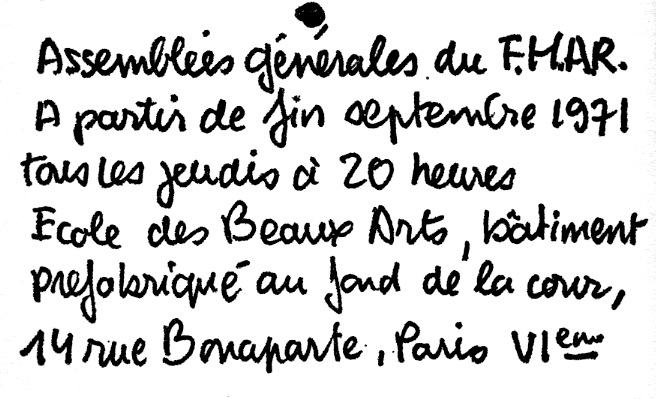
FHAR handbill

The Front homosexuel d'action révolutionnaire (transl. Homosexual Front for Revolutionary Action; FHAR) was a loose Parisian movement founded in 1971, resulting from an alliance between lesbian feminists and gay male activists. The movement had no official leaders, but Guy Hocquenghem and Françoise d'Eaubonne were among its most prominent representatives, while other members included Christine Delphy, Daniel Guérin, and Laurent Dispot. It had disappeared by 1976. Surviving early activists also include painter and surrealist photographer Yves Hernot, now living in Sydney, Australia.

The FHAR was known for giving radical visibility to homosexuals during the 1970s in the wake of student and proletarian uprisings of 1968, which had given little consideration to the liberation of women and homosexuals. Breaking with older homosexual groups, which kept a lower profile and were sometimes conservative, they asserted the subversion of the bourgeois and hetero–patriarchal state, as well as the inversion of chauvinistic and homophobic values common on the left and far left.

The outrageous behavior (from the authorities' point of view) at the male sexual encounters held by the group and the increasing prevalence of men (which inevitably distracted from feminist and lesbian issues), eventually brought about the group's disintegration. In its wake appeared the Groupe de libération homosexuelle (GLH) and the Gouines rouges within the Mouvement de libération des femmes (MLF).

== Birth and beginning ==
The group was originally formed by an alliance of feminists from the MLF and lesbians from the Arcadie organization, who were joined by gay men in February 1971. The foundations for an organization had been laid when posters for the "Comité d'action pédérastique révolutionnaire" (English: Committee of Revolutionary Pederastic Action) were put up at the Sorbonne during May 1968. The group organized weekly meetings on Thursday evenings at the École Nationale Supérieure des Beaux-Arts in Paris.

On 5 March 1971, the FHAR interrupted a meeting against the right to abortion, and on 10 March it attracted public attention by disrupting and stopping a Radio Luxembourg broadcast by Ménie Gregoire on the topic of homosexuality.

The name they gave themselves, "Front homosexuel d'action révolutionnaire", with the initialism FHAR, was registered officially as "Fédération Humaniste Anti-Raciste". They asserted the sexual freedom of all individuals. The group also communicated through the leftist newspaper Tout !. A statement by the group published in the paper's twelfth issue referred to the Manifesto of the 343, a 1971 petition signed by 343 women publicly declaring that they had had an abortion, then illegal in France:

Nous sommes plus de 343 salopes

Nous nous sommes faits enculer par des Arabes

Nous en sommes fiers et nous recommencerons

We are more than 343 sluts

We have been buggered by Arabs

We are proud of it and we will do it again

10,000 copies of Tout ! were seized by the police due to the contributions from the FHAR it contained, and the publication's editor, Jean-Paul Sartre, was prosecuted. However, the FHAR dropped in on the Constitutional Council to declare the attacks on freedom of expression unconstitutional, and in July 1971 the investigation was closed.

The FHAR denounced heterosexism and the medicalization of homosexuality. In 1971, they disrupted the international Congress of sexology in Sanremo. They also intervened in communist political meetings, in particular with Mutualité where Jacques Duclos said to them: "Allez vous faire soigner, bande de pédérastes, le PCF est sain!" (English: Go get yourself cured, you band of pederasts; the PCF is healthy!)

== Dissension ==
The growing power of men in the group led many women of the FHAR to break off, forming the Gouines rouges ("Red Dykes") splinter group in June 1971, with the aim of combatting sexism, male chauvinism, and androcracy.

Other groups became prominent, including Gazolines and the newspapers Fléau social and Antinorm. They published a Rapport contre la normalité in 1971 and a thick special edition of the review Research, edited by Félix Guattari, in 1973.

All these were, however, recognized by the slogans of the FHAR ("Prolétaires de tous les pays, caressez-vous!" / Workers of the world, caress yourselves! ("caressez-vous" being a French slang expression meaning "masturbate"), "Lesbiennes et pédés, arrêtons de raser les murs!" / Lesbians and fags, let us stop keeping a low profile) and the fight against the "hétéro-flics" (hetero–cops).

== Decline and legacy ==
The group began to lose members. Daniel Guérin left because of excesses by Gazolines during the funeral of a Maoist killed by a vigilante in 1972, while Françoise d'Eaubonne, who believed it had become nothing more than a place for flirting, also quit.

The police banned the meetings at the École des Beaux-Arts in February 1974, and the FHAR gave up its publicity stunts. It was disbanded in the same month.

Nevertheless, the FHAR left a substantial legacy. Its positions, quite different from the calls for social tolerance by the Acardie association, were taken up by homosexual associations and groups in the 1980s, such as Universités d’été euroméditerranéennes des homosexualités and Comité d'Urgence Anti-Répression Homosexuelle (CUARH) in 1979, and the magazine Gai pied.

The movement's radicalism and politicisation also influenced LGBT movements in the 1990s, partly inspiring the current queer movement in the United States of America and France.

== See also ==
=== Filmography ===
- FHAR (1971), a 26-minute black and white documentary of the first meetings and demonstrations of the FHAR, by Carole Roussopoulos
- Race d'Ep, Un siècle d'image de l'homosexualité (1979), docudrama by Lionel Soukaz and Guy Hocquenghem
- Bleu, blanc, rose (2000), documentary by Yves Jeuland on the French gay movement
- Ma saison super 8 (My Super 8 Season) (2005), directed by Alessandro Avellis (2005), a drama inspired by the FHAR
- La révolution du désir (The revolution of Desire) (2006), documentary directed by Alessandro Avellis

=== Bibliography ===
==== Stemming from the FHAR ====
- « Libre disposition de notre corps », Tout, n° 12, 23 April 1971.
- FHAR, Rapport contre la normalité, Paris, Champ libre, 1971. Reed. QuestionDeGenre/GKC, 2013.
- Dossier « Trois milliards de pervers. Grande encyclopédie des homosexualités », Recherches, March 1973.

==== On the FHAR ====
- Jacques Girard, Le Mouvement homosexuel en France, 1945-1981, Paris, Syros, 1981.
- Gunther, Scott Eric (2009). The Elastic Closet, A History of Homosexuality in France, 1942-present. New York: Palgrave Macmillan. ISBN 978-0-230-59510-1.
- Masques, revue des Homosexualités, n°9/10, Paris, 1981.
- Françoise d'Eaubonne, « Le FHAR, origines et illustration », la Revue h, n° 2, 1996.
- Didier Eribon, « FHAR », Dictionnaire des cultures gays et lesbiennes, Larousse, 2003.
- Michael Sibalis, « Gay Liberation Comes to France: The Front Homosexuel d’Action Révolutionnaire (FHAR) », French History and Civilization, 2005.

=== See also ===
- New social movements
- LGBT social movements
