= Victor Henry Anderson =

American poet, co-founder of Feri Tradition

- Born: May 21, 1917; Clayton, New Mexico, US
- Died: September 20, 2001 (aged 84); San Leandro, California, U.S.
- Occupations: Accordion player; poet
- Spouse: Cora Anderson (m. 1944)
- Children: 1

Victor Henry Anderson (May 21, 1917 – September 20, 2001) was an American priest and poet. He was co-founder of the Feri Tradition, a modern Pagan new religious movement established in California during the 1960s. Much of his poetry was religious in nature, being devoted to Feri deities.

Born in Clayton, New Mexico, to a working-class family, Anderson was left visually impaired during childhood. His family regularly moved around within the United States during his early years, with Anderson claiming that encounters with Mexican, Hawaiian, and Haitian migrants led to him gaining an early understanding of these various cultures' magical practices. The family eventually settled in Oregon, and Anderson later claimed that it was here that he was initiated into a tradition of witchcraft by an African woman. He later claimed that, in 1932, he joined a magico-religious group known as the Harpy Coven which was based in Ashland and which dissolved in the 1940s. According to his description, the group was devoted to a god and goddess, Setan and Lilith, and were influenced by both American folk magic and Huna.

In 1944, he married Cora Cremeans in Bend, Oregon, and, inspired by the writings of English Wiccan Gerald Gardner, they founded the Mahaelani Coven, gaining followers of what became known as the Feri tradition. One of their first initiates was Gwydion Pendderwen, who was a significant influence on the development of the tradition, and who introduced elements from Alexandrian Wicca in to it. Anderson was a professional accordion player and wrote poetry for various American Pagan magazines. In 1970, he published his first book of poetry, Thorns of the Blood Rose, which contained devotional religious poetry dedicated to the Goddess; it won the Clover International Poetry Competition Award in 1975. Anderson continued to promote the Feri tradition until his death, at which point April Niino was appointed as the new Grandmaster of the tradition.

== Early life ==
=== Childhood: 1917–1931 ===
Anderson was born on May 21, 1917, at the Buffalo Horn Ranch in Clayton, New Mexico. His parents were Hilbart Alexander Anderson (1883–1952) and Mary Frances Anderson (née Smith, 1886–1973). Regarding his ethnic ancestry, he later stated that "I am mostly Irish and Spanish with some Native American, including Polynesian". He also claimed that his maternal great-grandmother had been one of the Blue Fugates, a community living in Appalachia whose skin had a blueish coloration due to methemoglobinemia. Anderson became almost completely blind when he was two years old, either because of an accident or untreated diabetes. By 1920, the family were living in Burkburnett, Wichita County, Texas, where a sister, Elsie Glenan Anderson, was born in February. Here, Hilbart worked as a floor worker on some of the many oil rigs in the town. From there they moved to Albuquerque, New Mexico, where they were recorded as living in the 1923–24 directory, and where Anderson later claimed that he had made many friends among Mexican migrant children. Anderson's later wife claimed that he was also instructed in how to use his etheric vision by "Mexican Witches" during childhood. The family next moved to Olustee, Oklahoma, where Hilbart's brother resided.

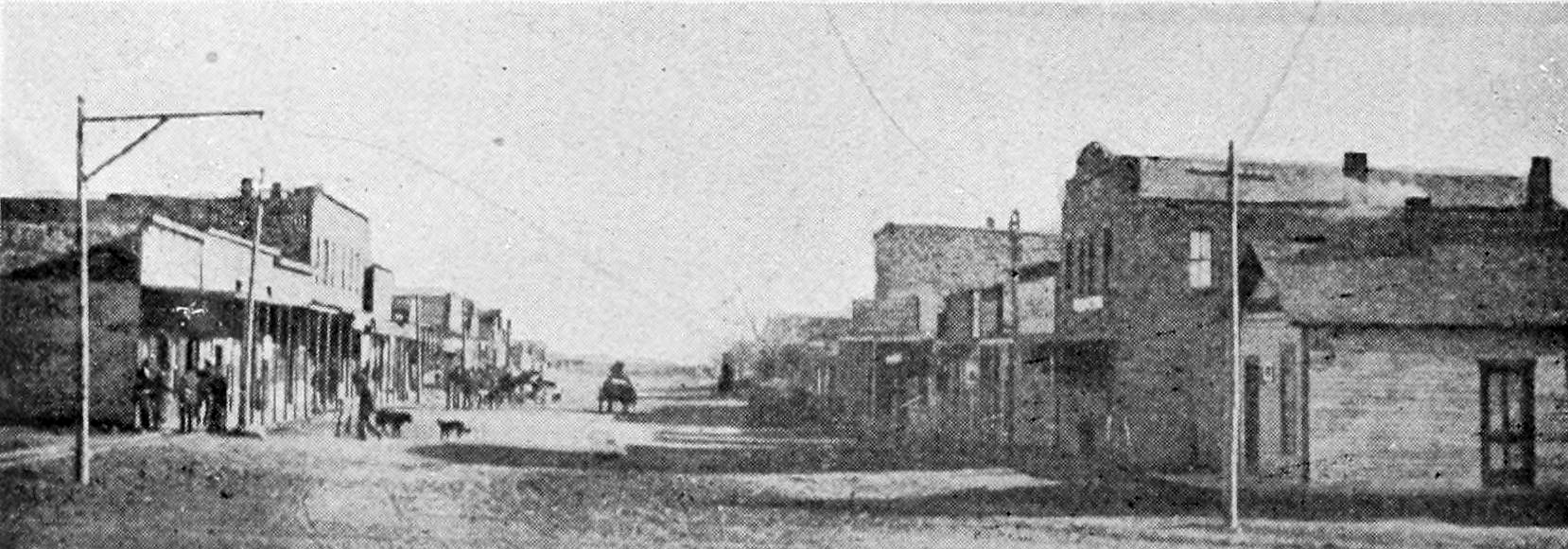
Anderson was born in Clayton, New Mexico, in the early 20th century (pictured)

After several months in Oklahoma they proceeded to the area around Ashland, Oregon, where Anderson claimed to have befriended Hawaiian and Haitian migrant families who were working as fruit pickers. Anderson often claimed that he had been instructed in the magical practices of Hawaiian Kahuna and Haitian Vodou, with his later wife referring to him as both "one of the last Kahuna" and "a priest of Voudou". He claimed to have been instructed in Vodou by Haitians who were working in southern Oregon. While living in that state he attended a school for the blind, although despite this was largely self-educated. The family moved around the state in the coming years; in August 1928 they were living in Pinehurst, where Hilbert was recorded as working as an engineer at a lumber mill in the 1930 census. By the 1940 census, the family were recorded as living in East Phoenix, Jackson county, Oregon, with Higbert adding that he had also been living there in 1935. At this point, Hilbert was working as a millwright and Mary as a trained nurse. In 1942 they were recorded as living in Ashland, and it was here that they attended the First Baptist Church, before relocating to Bend prior to 1944.

Anderson claimed to be initiated into a tradition of witchcraft in 1926 by a woman "of the Fairy race", whom he elsewhere referred to as "a priestess from Africa". Anderson informed the journalist Margot Adler that when he was nine years old he encountered a small old woman sitting in the centre of a circle containing brass bowls of herbs. He alleged that he instinctively stripped naked and that she then sexually initiated him into a witchcraft tradition, during which he had a vision of a goddess and a horned god. After the vision, he claimed that they sat in the circle and she instructed him in the magical use of the various herbs, after which he was washed in butter, oil, and salt, before putting his clothes on and returning home. The Pagan studies scholar Ethan Doyle White described this as being "difficult to accept as a literal account", but suggested that Anderson may have undergone a significant spiritual experience with an older woman in 1926, which was subsequently "embellished into the later tale" that he told Adler. A woman who knew Anderson, Cornelia Benavidez, later stated that "He says that he became friends with a woman in the circus who was a fire dancer and when she got older worked the stands. She somehow joined the circus in South Africa and made her way to the US. When he first met her she was 60 years old and he was a nine-year-old boy. He knew her for 15 years". Researcher William Wallworth provided potential supporting evidence for this claim when he noted that a number of the circuses that performed in Oregon during the 1920s and 1930s had Africans in their travelling retinues.

=== The Harpy Coven: 1932–1943 ===
"According to the picture ascertained by Voigt and supplemented by an open letter issued by Victor in 1991, the [Harpy] coven eclectically mixed American folk magic with Huna – a New Thought philosophy partly based in traditional Hawaiian religion – and venerated a god known as Setan as well as a goddess known as Lilith in both indoor and outdoor rituals organized according to the phases of the moon."

— Religious studies scholar Ethan Doyle White

Anderson claimed that in 1932 he was initiated into a witchcraft group in Ashland that he called the Harpy Coven, although remains the only source testifying to the group's existence. Research into the coven was later conducted by Valerie Voigt, the coordinator of the Pagan, Occult, and Witchcraft Special Interest Group of the United States branch of Mensa, who was also one of Anderson's students and who asked him about the group. According to her claims, the group were led by two figures, known as Maybelle "Cardea" Warren and Jerome Warren, with other members being Jim Murdoch, Patricia Fern, Tom C. ("Arven"), and Ruth D., the latter of whom was a preacher's wife. As related by Voigt, most of them had been immigrants from the Southern states, mainly from Alabama.

According to Voigt, the coven placed an emphasis on practical magic rather than worship, theology, ethics, or ritual, and were eclectic in their practices, mixing Huna with forms of American folk magic. She noted that they did not worship a goddess but held to a belief in a god who was opposed to the God of Christianity. Moreover, she claimed that they met together for both outdoor and indoor meetings, according to the phases of the moon. According to Voigt's account, Anderson also claimed that on occasion, the coven used a naked woman as their altar, and that the group disbanded after World War II broke out.

After the Pagan studies scholar Aidan A. Kelly published a summary of Voigt's research, Anderson released an open letter dated to August 21, 1991, refuting many of Kelly's claims and referring to it as "the stupid drivel of those who have only a shallow grasp of their alleged research." He stated that contrary to Kelly's assertions, the Harpy Coven had worshiped a goddess, who was known as Lilith, and that "we did not think of her as merely the Goddess, but as God Herself". He added that the coven also venerated a consort of the Goddess, who was known as Setan, but "although the Goddess tells us that away from the sweet influence of her love, he is the most terrible of all spirits, he is not the fallen angel or 'Satan' of Christianity or Islam". Kelly later stated that the Harpy Coven might "have been self-trained or may have descended from an earlier person or group".

== Later life: 1944–2001 ==
Anderson met Cora Ann Cremeans in Bend, Oregon, in 1944; they married three days later, on May 3, claiming that they had encountered each other before in the astral realm. Born in Nyota, Alabama, in January 1915, Cora had been exposed to folk magical practices from childhood; reputedly, her Irish grandfather was a "root doctor" who was known among locals as the "druid". The Andersons claimed that one of their first acts after their marriage was the erection of an altar. The following year, a son was born, and they named him Victor Elon, with the latter being the Hebrew word for oak; Cora claimed that she had received the name in a dream. After the birth, a ritual was held to dedicate the infant to the Goddess. In 1948, the family moved to Niles, California, later that year purchasing a home in San Leandro. There, Anderson became a member of the Alameda Lodge of the Fraternal Order of Eagles, and he subsequently remained so for forty years. Victor earned his living as a musician, playing the accordion at events, while Cora worked as a hospital cook. It has been claimed that Anderson could speak Hawaiian, Spanish, Creole, Greek, Italian, and Gothic.

In the mid-1950s Victor and Cora read Witchcraft Today, a 1954 book by English Wiccan Gerald Gardner, with Cora claiming that Victor corresponded with Gardner for a time. The Pagan studies scholar Chas S. Clifton has suggested that the Andersons used Gardner's work as a "style guide" for the development of their own tradition of modern Pagan witchcraft. Similarly, Kelly stated that the Andersons' tradition "began to more and more resemble that of the Gardnerians" as the couple learned more about the latter, adopting elements from it. Anderson was in correspondence with the Italian-American Wiccan Leo Martello, who encouraged Anderson to found his own coven. Circa 1960, the Andersons founded a coven, naming it Mahaelani, after the Hawaiian word for the full moon. Throughout the late 1950s and early 1960s, the Andersons initiated a number of individuals into the coven. One of these was Gwydion Pendderwen, a friend of their son who shared their interest in the esoteric. Pendderwen contributed to the development of what came to be known as the Feri tradition, with some members of the lineage viewing him as its co-founder. Pendderwen noted that he had first met the family when, aged thirteen, he got into a fight with Victor Elon, although the two later became friends. Pendderwen was particularly influenced by Welsh mythology, and on a visit to Britain he spent time with the Alexandrian Wiccans Alex Sanders and Stewart Farrar, subsequently introducing various Alexandrian elements into Feri Wicca. In the early 1970s, the Andersons established a new coven with Pendderwen and his initiate, Alison Harlow. After Pendderwen married, his wife also joined this coven, although it disbanded in 1974.

=== Anderson's teaching ===
Over the next four decades, the Andersons would initiate between twenty-five and thirty people into their tradition. Anderson has been described as one of the "founding teachers" and the "seminal voice" of the Feri tradition, although – according to Feri initiate Storm Faerywolf – he preferred to refer to himself as "Grand Master and a fairy chief". The original word that the Andersons used for their tradition was Vicia, "pronounced as in Italian." She added that "the name Fairy became accidentally attached to our tradition because Victor so often mentioned that word in speaking of nature spirits and Celtic magic". Early initiates alternately spelled the name of the tradition as Fairy, Faery, or Faerie, although Anderson began using the spelling Feri during the 1990s to differentiate it from other witchcraft traditions of the same name; not all practitioners followed his example. Cora claimed that Feri was the word's original spelling, adding that it meant "the things of magic". Anderson also referred to his form of Wicca as the Pictish tradition. In their writing, the Andersons mixed terminology adopted from Huna, Gardnerian Wicca, and Voodoo, believing that all reflected the same underlying magico-religious tradition. It drew heavily upon the huna system developed by Max Freedom Long. According to one Feri initiate, Corvia Blackthorn:

"The Andersons' teaching method was very informal. There were no classes in an academic sense, only conversations and the occasional ritual, usually followed by a home-cooked meal. Discussions with Victor were non-linear and overflowing with information. Someone once aptly remarked that talking to Victor was like to trying to drink from a fire hose. Often the connecting threads and underlying patterns in the information didn't become apparent until later on. There was also a non-verbal component to Victor's teaching. He was a true shaman, and had the ability to shift the consciousness of his students on a level well below the surface of conversation."

According to Kelly:

"Studying with Victor presented some unusual problems. He demanded as much respect as any working-class grandfather might. One could ask for clarification, but to even hint that one disagreed with him, or worse yet, to contradict him, would result in an immediate and permanent order to leave. One was tempted to ask such forbidden questions because Victor lived in mythic time and was totally uninterested in other people's concepts of logic or consistency ... Another student told me that when Victor read a new book and believed it was true, then he considered it to have always been true and would rethink his history accordingly."

According to one initiate, Jim Schuette, Anderson was "a taskmaster. He took pride in testing his students." One of those initiated into the Anderson's Feri tradition was Starhawk, who incorporated ideas from the Feri tradition when creating Reclaiming. She also included aspects from it in her 1979 book, The Spiral Dance, including mention of the Iron and Pearl Pentagram and the three souls, all of which originated within Feri Wicca. Another prominent initiate was Gabriel Carillo (Caradoc ap Cador), who in the late 1970s developed a written body of Feri teachings, and began offering paid classes in the tradition in the 1980s, generating the Bloodrose lineage; doing so generated controversy among Feri initiates, with critics believing that it was morally wrong to charge for teaching.

=== Poetry and final years ===
"To Triple Mari of the moon we pray
And offer our devotions in the night,
For broken hearts who dare not dream by day
Shall find a refuge when Her healing light
Illuminates the city of our sins."

— "Mari of the Moon", poem by Anderson.

In 1970 Anderson privately published Thorns of the Blood Rose, which contained poems that he had authored over the previous 25 years. He stated that "every poem is a love letter to the Goddess". Money to publish the book had come from Cora's savings, with sales barely covering the costs of publication, so a second printing was not possible at that time. In 1975, this book received the Clover International Poetry Competition Award, and in 1980 it was republished by Pendderwen, who also put some of Anderson's poems to music for his own 1975 album, Songs for the Old Religion. Anderson also contributed work to Pagan magazines like Witch Eye, Green Egg, and Nemeton. Anderson had assembled a group of poems to be published as a second book, released posthumously as Lilith's Garden in 2005.

To honor her fiftieth wedding anniversary, in 1994 Cora authored a book titled Fifty Years in the Feri Tradition, deeming it a tribute to her husband. It has been termed "the definitive written work on Feri thealogy and thought". In 1998, Cora had a stroke and was left largely bedridden by its effects.

At the time of his death, he was still running a coven, which was known as Nostos or Blue Circle. He died at his home on September 20, 2001. He was survived by his wife, son, and various grandchildren and great-grandchildren. Cora then appointed a woman named Anaar, or April Niino, to be the new Grandmaster of the Feri tradition in summer 2003. The tradition itself survived, with various publications appearing that discussed the practice of magic from a Feri perspective.

== Teachings ==
"Victor has been accused of making up the pantheon of Feri Gods, Guardians and spirits. He has told everyone again and again that he did not learn all he knows from others verbatim. He certainly did learn much from the people of his tradition, but he is a shaman and priest in his own right. I have personally witnessed his communication with our Gods".

— Cora Anderson, 1994.

Anderson's Feri Wicca tradition theistically revolved around a Goddess, who was named Mari after the Basque folkloric character. In Feri theology, Mari was accompanied by a male consort, a Horned God named Krom. Krom was also viewed as a union of two separate entities, the Divine Twins. Cora claimed that the Goddess had created these Twins, "not because she had to have male help, but because in her divine lust she desired them". According to Anderson, the name Mari meant "mother of water", and he described both Mari and Krom as having been the deity names of "the tiny dark aborigines of Scotland, Ireland, and the ancient British Isles". The God was also referred to as Melek Taus. He stressed the view that these deities were real entities, rather than Jungian archetypes, the latter being a view that had been espoused by other Pagans.

Systems of morality in Feri revolved largely around the idea of kala; Cora stated that this term was borrowed from the Hawaiian language and that it meant "keep[ing] oneself clean and bright and free from complexes within and without". Cora stated that the Feri tradition had "a code of honor and sexual morality which is as tough and demanding as the Bushido of Japan and of Shinto". She added that while Christian missionaries would understand Feri as a "sex cult", "we do not behave like a bunch of slavering mad dogs in heat". Initiation into Feri was a sexual act, and according to Cora "in initiation you literally marry the Goddess, her dual consort and the Gods, whether you are male or female". It involved a male priest giving the female initiate the names of the God and Goddess upon orgasm. If the female initiate was already betrothed to another, or did otherwise not wish to have intercourse with the priest, then a ritual known as the Intentions of the Heart took place. In this, her next sexual act with another person would be considered her initiation. When a female initiated a male, there was a similarly sexual component although according to Cora, "there are some important differences".

The Andersons taught that there were three parts of the soul, with Doyle White believing that they had adopted this belief from those of Hawaii. Cora stated that the first part of the soul inhabited "the etheric body or double", surrounding and penetrating the physical body, extending about 2 cm from human flesh and colored either "a misty blue-gray" or "a lovely electric pink". According to her, the second part of the soul inhabited the aura and extended 8 to 9 inches from the physical body. She believed that the third part of the soul was "the Godself" and lived in the top of the aura, appearing as a blue, white or gold ball of light. The Andersons also expressed a belief in reincarnation, believing that the allocation of one's future births were organized by karma. They taught that between incarnations, a soul could travel to one of nine etheric globes surrounding the Earth, in which existed "well-defined classes of nature spirits" which included gnomes, sylphs, undines, and salamanders.

Cora described Feri as the "direct survival of old Stone Age religion", reflecting a trend within the Wiccan community for retaining faith in the witch-cult hypothesis long after it was academically discredited by historians. The Andersons believed that the Witchcraft religion had emerged in Africa and been spread throughout the world, believing that Feri Wicca was essentially the same as Sami indigenous religion, Voudou, and Santeria. She believed that the ritual tools of "the Craft" were "very much alike throughout the world in both time and place". She listed the ritual tools as an athame "to raise or focus power", a binding cord for use in "ritual liberation and unbinding", as well as a scourge "to raise power", although the latter was never used to whip human beings. A chalice is used in rituals, symbolizing "the yoni female receptacle of the life force", with an accompanying stone or wax phallus which is sometimes dipped into the chalice during rituals. A stone or wooden egg "honors the cosmic egg which God held in her womb". Cora stated that in their rituals "power is raised and used in magic operations for the good of our human race, our ecology, or for necessary martial purposes".

According to Adler, Anderson had "a very poetic way of looking at the world". Alison Harlow had informed her that Anderson's claims about his origins often changed, with Doyle White commenting that "Anderson believed that the telling of spiritual 'truths' through stories was more important than factual accounts of the past". Anderson described Feri witchcraft as "a devotional science", and his wife called him "an Einstein of the occult". Cora claimed that the couple were "scientists in the truest sense". Adler noted that some of the "hallmarks" of the Feri tradition were its "shamanic practices and sexual mysticism". It only involved one initiation. There is no set book of liturgy in the tradition, with teachings being passed down orally. Practitioner Storm Faerywolf noted that "the Feri tradition is less about specific practices and more about energetic experience".

== Bibliography ==
Year of publication	Title	Co-author	Publisher
1970	Thorns of the Blood Rose	–	Self-published
2004	Etheric Anatomy: The Three Selves and Astral Travel	Cora Anderson	Acorn Guild Press
2005	Lilith's Garden	–	Acorn Guild Press
2012	The Heart of the Initiate: Feri Lessons	Cora Anderson	Harpy Books
