= Reclaiming (Neopaganism) =

Feminist modern witchcraft organization founded in 1979 by Starhawk and Diane Baker

- Type: Neopagan witchcraft
- Classification: Feminist-orientated neopagan witchcraft
- Orientation: Feri Tradition · Dianic Wicca
- Theology: Goddess movement
- Structure: Co-creating groups
- Region: United States
- Founder: Starhawk and Diane Baker
- Origin: 1979; San Francisco Bay Area, California
- Members: Unknown

Reclaiming is a tradition in neopagan witchcraft, aiming to combine the Goddess movement with feminism and political activism (in the peace and anti-nuclear movements). Reclaiming was founded in 1979, in the context of the Reclaiming Collective (1978–1997), by two Neopagan women of Jewish descent, Starhawk and Diane Baker, in order to explore and develop feminist Neopagan emancipatory rituals.

Today, the organization focuses on progressive social, political, environmental and economic activism. Guided by a shared, "Principles of Unity, a document that lists the core values of the tradition: personal authority, inclusivity, social and environmental justice and a recognition of intersectionality".

== History ==
Reclaiming originated in 1979 in the San Francisco Bay Area, blending the influences of Victor and Cora Anderson's Feri Tradition, Dianic Wicca as taught by Z. Budapest, and the feminist, anarchist, peace, and environmental movements.

Researcher Rachel Morgain writes:

Founding members of Reclaiming drew from earth-based pagan and magical traditions and from a growing feminist spirituality literature signalled by the publication of works such as Mary Daly's (1978) Gyn/Ecology and Christ and Plaskow's (1979) Woman-Spirit Rising, melding this with the anarchist politics and methods of participatory democracy of the direct-action movement to form a unique tradition of Paganism bent on radical social transformation, despite a broadening membership base that has diluted some of its more revolutionary foundations. The focus on social change remains central among many core practitioners, while the activism, books and writings of Reclaiming's most famous priestess, Starhawk, continue to draw in layers of new members from earth-activist and other radical political communities. Central to this Reclaiming focus on social transformation is their theology of 'immanence' which teachers see as very different from the emphasis on 'transcendence' in major world religions, particularly the Judaeo-Christian tradition. For reclaiming teachers, immanent theology places sacrality primarily in the material world, particularly in the natural world and in human beings.

== Influences and teachings ==
Reclaiming rituals are designed to encourage a spiritual way of life that blends respect for the earth and other living beings with a fuller sense of personal well-being and alignment with spiritual values. Starhawk and Valentine's handbook Twelve Wild Swans involves instructions for interpreting the tale of the book's title through both the 'inner' and 'outer' paths of personal and social transformation, the two paths being seen alike as necessary facets of the same overall project. Without a focus on healing the self, Reclaiming members believe people are certain to perpetuate the social ills they have internalised through the damage done by modernity. Their ritual work is thus focused as much on personal healing and transformation as on social justice.

== See also ==
- Feminism
- Modern paganism and New Age
