= A Community of Witches =

Book by Helen A. Berger

A Community of Witches: Contemporary Neo-Paganism and Witchcraft in the United States
- First edition cover
- Author: Helen A. Berger
- Language: English
- Subject: Sociology of religion; Pagan studies
- Publisher: University of South Carolina Press
- Publication date: 1999
- Publication place: United States
- Media type: Print (hardcover · paperback)
- Pages: 148
- ISBN: 978-1-57003-246-2

A Community of Witches: Contemporary Neo-Paganism and Witchcraft in the United States is a sociological study of the Wiccan and wider Pagan community in the Northeastern United States. It was written by American sociologist Helen A. Berger of the West Chester University and first published in 1999 by the University of South Carolina Press. It was released as a part of a series of academic books entitled Studies in Comparative Religion, edited by Frederick M. Denny, a religious studies scholar at the University of Chicago.

Berger became interested in studying the Wiccan and Pagan movement in 1986, when she presented a lecture on the subject at the Boston Public Library. Subsequently, becoming acquainted with members of the New England Pagan community, she undertook fieldwork in both a local Wiccan coven, the Circle of Light, and a wider Pagan organisation, the EarthSpirit Community (ESC). In total, Berger underwent 11 years of fieldwork among the Pagan community. Along with ESC founder Andras Corban Arthen, Berger also undertook a "Pagan Census" survey of the U.S. in the mid-1990s to obtain more data on the country's Pagan community.

A Community of Witches is based on interviews with more than a hundred practicing Wiccans and Pagans, study of the pre-existing literature on the subject and a national survey of the Pagan community in the U.S. In her work, Berger interprets Wicca as a religion of late modernity, as opposed to postmodernity, and subsequently examines it using the theories of sociologists Anthony Giddens and James A. Beckford. Themes covered include Pagan conceptions of the self, the role of covens and the wider Pagan community, the place of children in the movement and the increasing routinization of Wicca through the foundation of organised churches and clergy.

Academic reviewers were mostly positive, but several raised concerns over Berger's incorrect use of terminology. Reviewers noted the study's importance in developing Pagan studies as an academic discipline and helping further the wider sociological investigation into new religious movements in the United States. In the years following the study's publication, Berger continued to investigate the Pagan community, focusing her interest on the popularity of Wicca among teenagers.

== Background ==
=== Paganism and Wicca in the United States ===
Contemporary Paganism, also referred to as Neo-Paganism, is an umbrella term used to identify a wide variety of modern religious movements, particularly those influenced by or claiming to be derived from the various pagan beliefs of pre-modern Europe. The religion of Pagan Witchcraft, or Wicca, was developed in England during the first half of the 20th century and is one of several Pagan religions. The figure at the forefront of Wicca's early development was the English occultist Gerald Gardner, the author of Witchcraft Today (1954) and The Meaning of Witchcraft (1959) and the founder of a tradition known as Gardnerian Wicca. Gardnerian Wicca revolved around the veneration of both a Horned God and a Mother Goddess, the celebration of eight seasonally-based festivals in a Wheel of the Year and the practice of magical rituals in groups known as covens. Gardnerianism was subsequently brought to the U.S. in the early 1960s by an English initiate, Raymond Buckland, and his then-wife Rosemary, who together founded a coven in Long Island. In the U.S., new variants of Wicca developed, including Dianic Wicca, a tradition founded in the 1970s which was influenced by second-wave feminism, emphasized female-only covens, and rejected the veneration of the Horned God. One initiate of both the Dianic and Gardnerian traditions was a woman known as Starhawk who went on to found her own tradition, Reclaiming Wicca. She furthermore published The Spiral Dance: a Rebirth of the Ancient Religion of the Great Goddess (1979), a book which helped spread Wicca throughout the U.S.

=== Academic fieldwork into Wicca ===
Prior to Berger's work, several American researchers working in the field of Pagan studies had separately published investigations of the Pagan community in the United States and the United Kingdom. The first of these was the practicing Wiccan, journalist and political activist Margot Adler in her Drawing Down the Moon: Witches, Druids, Goddess-Worshippers, and Other Pagans in America Today, which was first published by Viking Press in 1979. A second study was produced by the anthropologist Tanya M. Luhrmann in her Persuasions of the Witch's Craft: Ritual Magic in Contemporary England (1989), in which she focused on both a Wiccan coven and several ceremonial magic orders that were then operating in London.

The next academic book to be published based upon fieldwork undertaken in the U.S. Pagan community was Living Witchcraft: A Contemporary American Coven, published by Praeger in 1994. Living Witchcraft had been co-written by three academics, the sociologist Allen Scarboro, psychologist Nancy Campbell and literary critic Shirley Stave, herself a Wiccan practitioner. It was based upon their fieldwork undertaken in the Ravenwood coven of Atlanta, Georgia, over several months across 1990 and 1991. At the same time as Scarboro, Campbell and Stave were undertaking their research, the American anthropologist and practicing Wiccan Loretta Orion was also undertaking an investigation into the Pagan movement in the East Coast and Midwest of the United States. Orion's work was published as Never Again the Burning Times: Paganism Revisited by Waveland Press in 1995, although would be heavily criticized in published reviews written by both Luhrmann and T. O. Beidelman, both of whom were of the opinion that Orion's Pagan beliefs had clouded her critical interpretation. 1997 then saw the publication of Witchcraft and Paganism in Australia, authored by the anthropologist Lynne Hume.

=== Berger and her research ===
Helen Berger, then a lecturer in sociology at the West Chester University, had initially become involved in the study of the Pagan movement in preparation for a series of public lectures that she gave at the Boston Public Library in October 1986. Based on the subject of the historical witch trials that took place in New England during the early modern period, she devoted the final lecture in the series to an examination of the contemporary Pagan Witches, or Wiccans, then living in the area. Having yet to perform the sociological investigation that would culminate in A Community of Witches, Berger gained her information for this lecture from the information published in the works of Margot Adler, Starhawk and Marcello Truzzi, and also from a singular interview that she had carried out with a woman who was "peripherally associated" with Paganism. After the lecture, several audience members approached Berger to identify themselves as practicing Wiccans, and it was through them that she came into contact with the New England Pagan community. Three of the Wiccans at the lecture invited Berger to "participate as a researcher" as they founded their own coven, the Circle of Light, and she attended their weekly meetings and festival celebrations for the next two years.

"What is the Pagan Census Project?
The Pagan Census Project is an attempt to document the size and diversity of the contemporary Pagan movement as accurately as possible. Over the past thirty years, Paganism has exhibited a considerable growth in membership, but, given such factors as the lack of centralized organization within the Pagan movement and the relative anonymity sought by many of its adherents, it is very difficult to estimate how many of us there are ...
Why is it needed?
There are several reasons why such a project is important. If we can document our numbers in some tangible way, we will be in a stronger position to attain more credibility as a religion and as a community. Greater credibility would enable us to better address issues of religious discrimination and social prejudice (the Helms Bill, or movies such as The Craft, for instance); would give us more weight in addressing anti-Pagan stereotypes ... and it would give us greater access to influential forums (such as academia, interfaith councils, etc.) from which Pagans have mostly been excluded."

— An introduction to the Pagan Census form, Arthen and Berger

At the first open Pagan ritual that she attended, Berger met Andras Corban Arthen, the founder of the EarthSpirit Community (ESC), a Pagan organization open to non-Wiccans which she joined after paying the annual membership fee of $30. Attending many of the ESC's open rituals and festivals, she was introduced to a "diverse group" of Wiccans and other Pagans, and developed a contact base in the community. Berger and Arthen subsequently embarked on a project entitled "The Pagan Census" in an attempt to gain sociological data from the Pagan community across the U.S. Receiving funding from the Faculty Development Fund at West Chester University, Berger was aided in this project by over 15 students who helped her to code and enter data for the survey. Together, Berger and Arthen wrote and distributed their survey through Wiccan and Pagan organizations across the country, as well as in journals, on the internet and at festivals. The duo received over 2000 responses, providing Berger with one of her main sources of information.

Throughout her 11-year period of fieldwork, Berger had to use snowball sampling to retrieve her data on the Pagan community, something that she attributed to the "secrecy of groups and practitioners". She conducted formal interviews with over 40 practicing Pagans, and over 60 others instead were informally interviewed during conversations at Pagan events, following which Berger recorded their responses in her fieldnotes. She participated in rituals with ten different Wiccan covens, two of which were all-female covens, and the other eight of which were mixed-gender in structure, but all of whom assembled in the Northeastern United States. Accepting that this regional focus might affect her results, she supplemented her fieldwork by reading literature on Paganism from across the country, concluding that "the differences among groups and practitioners within the United States are less important than the similarities." Unlike the sociologists Margot Adler and Loretta Orion, both of whom had been or became Pagans whilst studying the movement, Berger stated that she had not joined the religion, thereby remaining an "outsider" throughout her research, but had made many friends within the Pagan community.

A Community of Witches was a part of a series of books entitled 'Studies in Comparative Religion' that were published by the University of South Carolina Press, and edited by Frederick M. Denny. In Denny's preface to the book, he remarked that it "adds significantly to the steadily growing scholarly literature" on the subject of Wicca and contemporary Paganism, being of "considerable use for our understanding of how other new religious communities are sustaining and developing themselves in the unprecedented rich tapestry of American religious pluralism."

== Synopsis ==
"This book is an exploration of the new religious movement of Neo-Paganism and Witchcraft as practiced in the United States among groups that include both women and men. My purpose is twofold: to examine Witchcraft as a religion of late modernity and to analyze the aging process of this new religion. In placing the Witchcraft movement within the context of late modernity, I have been influenced by Giddens's structuration theory and Beckford's work on religions of late modernity."

— Helen A. Berger, in the opening preface

Starting with a preface in which Berger explains how she first began studying the Wiccan and Pagan community of New England, Berger opens the main part of her book with a description of a Wiccaning which she attended. Proceeding to introduce both the Wiccan religion and her theoretical approach, Berger explains the British sociologist James A. Beckford's approach to the religions of late modernity as well as Anthony Giddens' theoretical approaches to modernism.

In the second chapter, "The Magical Self", Berger examines the ways in which Wiccans in the U.S. understand themselves, looking at sociological ideas about self-identity and utilising them in her analysis of Wiccan rituals that deal with the transformation of the self. She moves on to look at concepts of gender in the Wiccan community, both for men and women and among homosexuals. The third chapter, entitled "The Coven: Perfect Love, Perfect Trust", provides an explanation of the coven system within Wicca, and the ways in which friendships are built and collapse amongst coven members, and the extent to which covens imitate family structures.

Chapter four, "A Circle within a Circle: The Neo-Pagan Community", looks at the wider community beyond the coven structure, interpreting it through theoretical ideas about community in late modernity. Moving on, Berger looks at ideas of community memory and community building amongst U.S. Pagans, before examining the manner in which some Pagans engage in both emancipatory politics and life politics. The fifth chapter, entitled "The Next Generation", is devoted to the place of children within the Pagan community, and deals with ideas of rites of passage, attitudes towards children's sexuality and the extent to which children are involved in rituals.

The sixth chapter, "The Routinization of Creativity", looks at the relationship between Wicca and routinization, and examines how the anti-authoritarian ethos of the religion has been in part eroded through the creation of Pagan organisations like the EarthSpirit Community and the Circle Sanctuary, which have purchased land and led to the development of a paid clergy. Finally, Berger concludes her work with a round-up of her study, and muses on the possible future for Wicca in the United States.

== Arguments ==
=== Wicca as a religion of late modernity ===
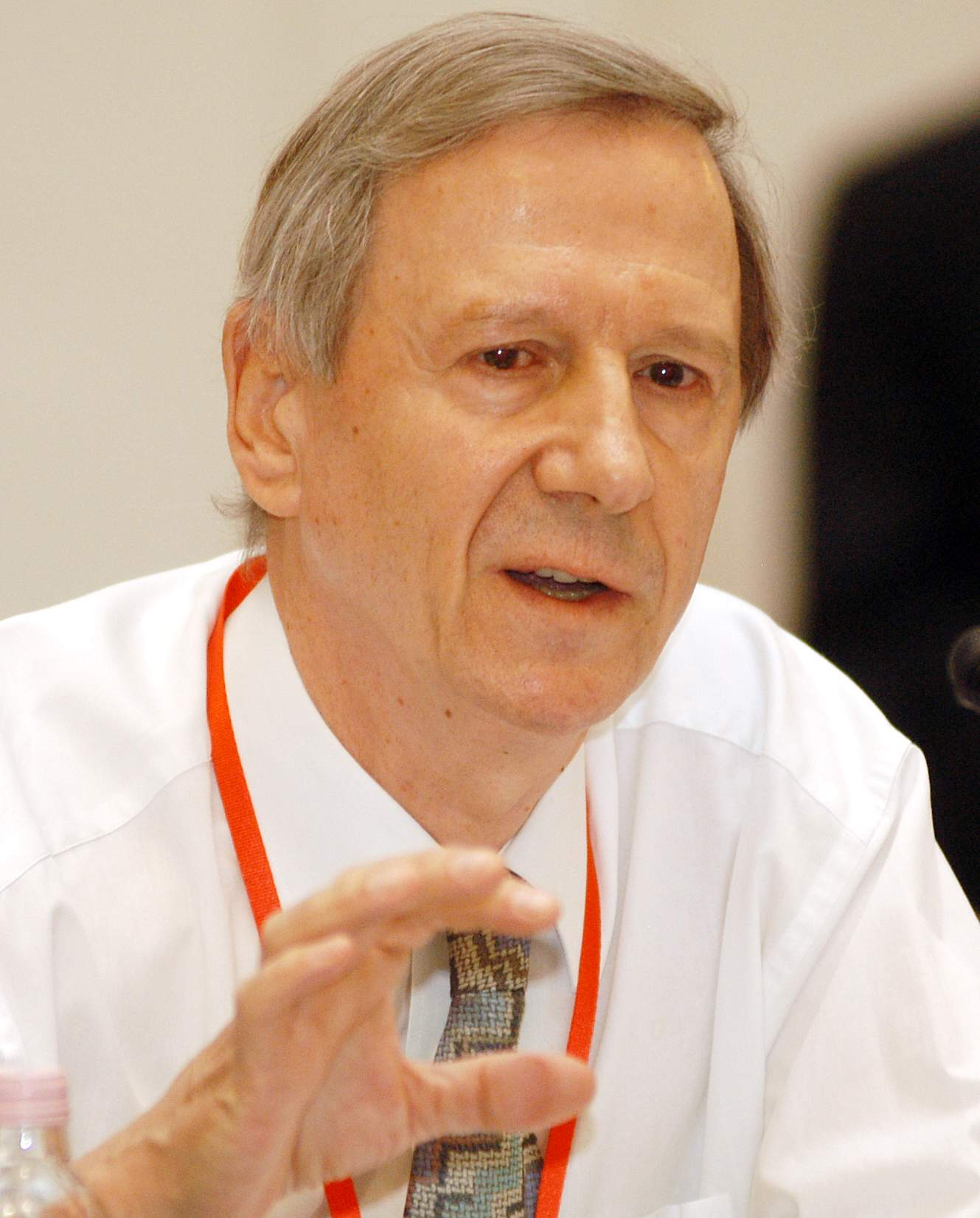
The structuration theory of British sociologist Anthony Giddens played a significant influence on Berger's study.

Whereas the sociologist Loretta Orion had believed that contemporary Paganism was a postmodern movement, in A Community of Witches, Berger argued against this, instead considering Wicca to be a religion of late modernity. In supporting this position, Berger turned to the work of the British sociologist of religion, James A. Beckford, who in his book Religion and Advanced Industrial Society (1989) had argued that many new religious movements reflect the characteristics of late modernity by challenging traditional definitions of religion, sharing a holistic worldview and emphasizing the development and transformation of the self. Berger stated that while "Wicca is not specifically mentioned by Beckford, it does fit the model of New Age religions that he is analyzing." Whilst accepting that elements of postmodernism can be found within Wicca, Berger argued that the religion does not "signify an epistemological break with Enlightenment thought", and that as such it was intrinsically late modernist in structure; as she related, the "emphasis on globalism, the belief in personal and social transformation, and the use of noninstrumental rationality place Wicca firmly within the Enlightenment tradition."

Berger's choice of "framework for understanding Wicca within the context of late modernity" was that of structuration, a theory put forward by the English sociologist and political theorist Anthony Giddens in his book The Constitution of Society (1984). Structuration theory maintains that both structure and agency influence human beings in their choices; the former refers to the recurrent patterned arrangements which influence or limit the choices and opportunities available for an individual, whilst the latter refers to the capacity of individuals to act independently and to make their own free choices. Berger argued that whilst the beliefs and practices of Wiccans were "in part determined by social factors, such as class, race and gender", at the same time these Wiccans exerted a level of control and self-determination over their lives "both by the very act of becoming a Witch and through the self-conscious use of rituals to create a persona."

=== Wicca as a result of globalism ===
Berger was of the opinion that Wicca's "development and spread" could be seen as "an outgrowth of globalism". As evidence, she noted that the religion had been created by modern westerners adopting elements from a variety of "older and geographically disparate religious practices" in order to fashion their new faith, something which she believed was only possible in a globalised world.

=== The future of Wicca ===
Whereas Mary Jo Neitz (1991) and Nancy J. Finley (1991) had both argued that ultimately, it would be the feminist-orientated, female-only form of Wicca found in the Dianic tradition that would grow to become dominant in the United States, Berger disagreed, arguing that "inclusive groups", meaning those traditions who welcome both men and women into their covens, "will ultimately prove to be more significant." She believed that this was in part because they "are more likely to include and fully involve children in their practices", something which she saw as having the likely "greatest impact" on the future of Wicca in the United States. In Berger's view, these children born into the faith would act as "maintainers of their families' practice", replacing the role that had formerly been played by neophytes in the community.

== Reception and recognition ==
=== Academic reviews ===
In a review published in the Review of Religious Research journal, Stephen D. Glazier of the University of Nebraska–Lincoln described A Community of Witches as an "important study" which had "many virtues and few faults." Glazier commended it as an improvement on earlier sociological studies of contemporary Paganism, which in his opinion had dwelt on "personal experiences" and acted as something of "proselytizers for Neo-Pagan beliefs and practices." He furthermore praised Berger for "maintaining a high degree of theoretical sophistication" while still "remaining accessible for the average reader". He also expressed several criticisms, for instance noting that Berger had used the terms "Wiccan" and "Neo-Pagan" interchangeably, even though they have different meanings, something that he felt might confuse some of the book's readers.

In her review of A Community of Witches published in the Sociology of Religion journal, Frances Kostarelos of the Governors State University commented positively on Berger's work, describing it as "an invaluable theoretical and descriptive account of Wicca" that is also "a fine example of ethnographic research and writing." Stefanie von Schnurbein of the University of Chicago described A Community of Witches as "an exciting and important approach to the study of contemporary neopaganism" in her review published in The Journal of Religion. Schnurbein believed that Berger "has an intimate knowledge of her field and makes creative and interesting use of contemporary sociological theory" but that a "discussion of the vivid cultural and theoretical controversies around gender and sexuality would have added to the theoretical value of Berger's book."

Writing in the Contemporary Sociology journal, Tanice G. Foltz of Indiana University Northwest described A Community of Witches as "Well organized, clearly written, and aimed at an academic audience". Believing it to be a "valuable addition to the existing scholarship on witchcraft", Foltz did highlight some problems with the work, wishing that it had included an "in-depth analysis" of her Pagan Census survey and noting that it erroneously used the terms "Neo-Paganism", "Witchcraft" and "Wicca" interchangeably. In her review for the Journal for the Scientific Study of Religion, Mary Jo Neitz of the University of Missouri was more critical, arguing that Berger had generalised information from the north-eastern U.S. and claimed that it was applicable for the Pagan community across the entire country, something which Neitz felt was counter to her "own observations of Wicca."

=== Wider recognition ===
A Community of Witches was awarded the A List Exceptional Books of 1999 Award. It was also mentioned by Canadian religious studies scholar Barbara Jane Davy in her 2007 work, Introduction to Pagan Studies, during which she listed the books on Pagan studies that had then seen publication.

== Berger's later work ==
The publication of A Community of Witches did not signal the end of Berger's studies on the subject of American Paganism, and over the following several years she would publish several more volumes detailing her work in this area. In 2003, she co-authored a book delving deeper into the results of the Pagan Census that she had undertaken with Andras Corban Arthen. Entitled Voices from the Pagan Census: A National Survey of Witches and Neo-Pagans in the United States, it was co-written with Leigh S. Shaffer, a fellow professor of sociology at West Chester University, and also with Evan A. Leach, then an associate professor of management at West Chester. Like A Community of Witches, Voices from the Pagan Census was published by the University of South Carolina Press in their series on 'Studies in Comparative Religion', and in his preface to the book, the series editor Frederick M. Denny referred to it as the "sequel" to Berger's earlier work.

In their preface, Berger, Leach and Shaffer discussed the Pagan Census and how it had been used in producing A Community of Witches; they noted that at the time Berger had originally written the book, "the rest of the data had not been completely processed, cleaned, and analyzed. Unlike that book, which relied primarily on her ethnographic research in the northeastern United States and an analysis of journals, books, and newsletters written by Neo-Pagans, this one is based primarily on the survey data."

In 2005, the University of Pennsylvania published an edited anthology entitled Witchcraft and Magic in the New World: North America in the Twentieth Century, which had been edited by Berger. In 2007, Berger's third book was published, Teenage Witches: Magical Youth and the Search for the Soul, which had been co-written with Douglas Ezzy, a senior lecturer in sociology at the University of Tasmania in Australia.
