= Living Witchcraft =

1994 book by Allen Scarboro, Nancy Campbell and Shirley Stave

Living Witchcraft: A Contemporary American Coven
- The first edition cover of the book
- Author: Allen Scarboro, Nancy Campbell and Shirley Stave
- Language: English
- Subject: Sociology of religion Pagan studies
- Publisher: Praeger
- Publication date: 1994
- Publication place: United States and United Kingdom
- Media type: Print (Hardcover)
- ISBN: 978-0-275-94688-3

Living Witchcraft: A Contemporary American Coven is a sociological study of an American coven of Wiccans who operated in Atlanta, Georgia, US, during the early 1990s. It was co-written by the sociologist Allen Scarboro, psychologist Nancy Campbell and literary critic Shirley Stave and first published by Praeger in 1994. Although largely sociological, the study was interdisciplinary, and included both insider and outsider perspectives into the coven; Stave was an initiate and a practicing Wiccan while Scarboro and Campbell remained non-initiates throughout the course of their research.

The trio became friends after meeting at an academic seminar devoted to the study of religion held at Emory University, Atlanta in 1990. Stave subsequently revealed herself to the group as a Wiccan, a member of a new religious movement that interested Scarboro and Campbell, and together the three decided to undertake a study of the Wiccan coven to which Stave belonged. This, the Ravenwood coven, met in the local area, where it was led by a High Priestess named Lady Sintana. Learning of their proposals, Lady Sintana gave them her permission to attend the coven's rituals, classes and open houses and also to interview its members.

Divided into three parts, Living Witchcraft offers a sociological investigation of a coven of Wiccans located in Atlanta known as Ravenwood.

== Background ==
=== Wicca in the United States ===
Contemporary Paganism, which is also referred to as Neo-Paganism, is an umbrella term used to identify a wide variety of modern religious movements, particularly those influenced by or claiming to be derived from the various pagan beliefs of pre-modern Europe. The religion of Pagan Witchcraft, or Wicca, was developed in England during the first half of the 20th century and is one of several pagan religions. The figure at the forefront of Wicca's early development was the English occultist Gerald Gardner (1884–1964), the author of Witchcraft Today (1954) and The Meaning of Witchcraft (1959) and the founder of a tradition known as Gardnerian Wicca. Gardnerian Wicca revolved around the veneration of both a Horned God and a Mother Goddess, the celebration of eight seasonally-based festivals in a Wheel of the Year and the practice of magical rituals in groups known as covens. Gardnerianism was subsequently brought to the U.S. in the early 1960s by an English initiate, Raymond Buckland (born 1934), and his then-wife Rosemary, who together founded a coven on Long Island.

In the U.S., new variants of Wicca developed, including Dianic Wicca, a tradition founded in the 1970s which was influenced by second wave feminism, emphasized female-only covens, and rejected the veneration of the Horned God. One initiate of both the Dianic and Gardnerian traditions was a woman known as Starhawk (born 1951) who went on to found her own tradition, Reclaiming Wicca, as well as publishing The Spiral Dance: a Rebirth of the Ancient Religion of the Great Goddess (1979), a book which helped spread Wicca throughout the U.S.

=== Academic fieldwork into Wicca ===
Prior to the authors' work, several American researchers working in the field of Pagan studies had separately published investigations of the Pagan community in both the United States and the United Kingdom. The first of these had been the practicing Wiccan, journalist and political activist Margot Adler in her Drawing Down the Moon: Witches, Druids, Goddess-Worshippers, and Other Pagans in America Today, which was first published by Viking Press in 1979. A second study was produced by the anthropologist Tanya M. Luhrmann in her Persuasions of the Witch's Craft: Ritual Magic in Contemporary England (1989), in which she focused on both a Wiccan coven and several ceremonial magic orders that were then operating in London.

At the same time as Scarboro, Campbell and Stave were undertaking their research, the American anthropologist and practicing Wiccan Loretta Orion was also undertaking an investigation into the Pagan movement in the East Coast and Midwest of the United States. Orion's work would come to be published as Never Again the Burning Times: Paganism Revisited by Waveland Press in 1995, although would be heavily criticized in reviews written by both Luhrmann and T.O. Beidelman, both of whom were of the opinion that Orion's Pagan beliefs had clouded her critical interpretation. The sociologist Helen A. Berger of the West Chester University had also been undertaking fieldwork among the Wiccan community of New England during that decade, having developed an interest in researching the subject in 1986. The results of Berger's 11 years of research would come to be published by the University of South Carolina Press in 1999 as A Community of Witches: Contemporary Neo-Paganism and Witchcraft in the United States, to predominantly positive academic reviews.

=== Scarboro, Campbell, Stave and their research ===
"No one expected that an unlikely encounter and subsequent friendship among a sociologist, a psychologist, and a literary critic who came together to discuss the mind-body duality would end up in our writing a book on contemporary Witchcraft."
Scarboro, Campbell and Stave, 1994.

The project that resulted in Living Witchcraft originated at a seminar led by Robert Detweiler, a professor at Emory University's Graduate Institute of the Liberal Arts. Sponsored by the Dana Foundation, the seminar took place in Autumn 1990, and involved six professors from various U.S. colleges meeting together in Atlanta to share their research into various different aspects of religion and discuss conceptions of duality between the mind and the body. One of the academics attending the seminar, Shirley "Holly" Stave, a literary critic and untenured faculty member at Emory, soon admitted to the group that she was a practicing Wiccan, and told them of her belief that her religion could provide "a way of reuniting mind and body." Stave later explained to the group that she felt "moved" by "Spirit" to inform them of her own spiritual beliefs, in spite of the discrimination that this could bring upon her in the largely Christian state of Georgia. She also felt that in helping to educate others about Wiccan beliefs, it would ultimately help to prevent the misinformation and persecution that many Wiccans faced.

Two of the other academics attending the seminar were already familiar with the Wiccan movement. Allen Scarboro, then studying the sociology of religion, had previously undertaken magico-religious practices with two Native American shamans, and had a basic knowledge of various new religious movements including Wicca, while Nancy Campbell, an academic psychologist, had previously attended the rituals of a feminist Wiccan group. Wanting to learn more about the faith, Scarboro and Campbell approached Stave, asking her if they could witness any of the rituals performed by her coven, which was known as Ravenwood. After gaining the permission of the coven's High Priestess, Lady Sintana, they attended the group's Sabbat rite at Hallowmas, later deciding that they wanted to undertake research into the group for an interdisciplinary project, imagining that it would result in an extended academic paper.

Agreeing to their proposals, the only two constraints that Lady Sintana imposed on the researchers was that Scarboro and Campbell, the two non-initiates, could not "observe, know, or report the text for the circle-building procedures that immediately precede and prepare the energy circle for rituals", and that they also could not attend initiation rituals or learn the text for the Ravenwood initiation rites. These things, Lady Sintana maintained, were secrets that only those initiated into the coven could know. In putting together their research design, the trio were aided by Robin Ingalls, a student with a background in psychology and spirituality who was studying at Georgia State University, while another student, Gilbert Bond, who was then studying at Emory University's Graduate Institute of Liberal Arts, also aided them in their research. The group began their project in October 1990, having gathered most of their data by June 1991, by which time they had also written early drafts for several chapters of what would later come to be published as Living Witchcraft in 1994.

== Synopsis ==
=== Part I: Ravenwood: A Living Atlanta Coven ===
The first part of Living Witchcraft was devoted to describing the ritual activities which members of the Ravenwood coven took part in.

== Arguments ==
=== Insider/outsider dichotomy ===
Regarding their approach to fieldwork, the authors noted that they had given "serious consideration" to whether Stave, being a practicing Wiccan, could be objective in her participation in the study. However, as they later noted, "poststructural theoretical perspective[s]" had shown that "pure objectivity is never possible", and that the "context of each researcher – gender, race, socioeconomic level, sexual orientation, one's biography as a whole – shapes that person's understanding." Rather than aiming to achieve a positivist objectivity, they instead focused on achieving what American anthropologist Clifford Geertz (1926–2006) referred to as a "thick description" in his book The Interpretation of Cultures (1973). This "thick description" approach would not only present the Wiccans themselves in a manner that they would recognize, but also related what a "non-Witch, specifically a thinking, reflective, non-Witch, would experience were she or he to participate in rituals and classes at Ravenwood."

== Reception and recognition ==
=== Academic reviews ===
The anthropologist Tanya Luhrmann (born 1959) of the University of California, San Diego, published a review of both Living Witchcraft and Loretta Orion's Never Again the Burning Times (1995) in the Journal of Anthropological Research. Noting that Living Witchcraft was "as sympathetic to the practice" of Wicca as Orion's study, she believed however that it had the advantage of being "written from the more distanced stand of the participant-observer as understood in mainstream anthropology." In focusing in on one particular coven rather than trying to provide a broader study of the Wiccan movement, Luhrmann felt that Living Witchcraft had provided a study which was "unusual and fascinating and remarkably rich in its detail." She proceeded to note that in her opinion, the "eye-opening" feature of the book was its examination of what life was like for public Witches living in the Deep South, a predominantly conservative and Christian part of the United States. In summing up her review, Luhrmann stated that "witchcraft remains an important study for anthropological research, if only because so many people have such peculiar ideas about it."
