= Baird Searles =

American novelist (1934–1993)

William Baird Searles (April 30, 1934 – March 22, 1993) was a science fiction author and critic. He was best known for his long-running review columns for the magazines Asimov's (reviewing books), Amazing, and Fantasy & Science Fiction (reviewing films, television and related media). He also did occasional reviews for other publications, including The New York Times, Publishers Weekly, and The Village Voice. He wrote several non-fiction works on the science fiction genre. Searles managed a science fiction and fantasy bookstore in New York City's Greenwich Village, the Science Fiction Shop, which is no longer in business.

From about 1963 through 1971, Baird Searles was the Drama and Literature director at WBAI, a listener-sponsored Pacifica Foundation radio station in New York City. On one of his programs, "The New Symposium" broadcast in 1968, he discussed issues 'for and by the homosexual community', being very possibly the first person to bring gay issues in a positive light to broadcast media on a regular basis.

At a time when radio drama had waned to a trickle of obscurity, Searles kept the art alive with collaborators from the science fiction/fantasy community working directly with such writers as Joanna Russ, Roger Zelazny, Theodore Sturgeon and Samuel R. Delany. Searles' two-hour adaptation of Delany's "The Star Pit" was narrated by the author and won critical acclaim. He produced and narrated a complete serialized dramatic reading of Olaf Stapledon's epic novel, Last and First Men. He also produced a dramatized reading of the Gormenghast trilogy by the late British author Mervyn Peake, which helped bring these novels to the attention of readers in the U.S. His weekly series, "Of Unicorns and Universes," was the only program of critical commentary on science fiction and fantasy in its day.

After Searles left WBAI to concentrate on writing, editing, and running his bookstore, he returned to WBAI to narrate "The Council of Elrond" from J. R. R. Tolkien's The Lord of the Rings. Searles and producers Jim Freund, Margot Adler and David Marx authenticated the pronunciations of the characters and the languages by speaking on the phone with Professor Tolkien. This 100-minute reading is still broadcast every year in late December on Jim Freund's Hour of the Wolf radio show on WBAI in New York.

Searles and his partner Martin Last moved from New York to Montreal in about 1990, and became involved in the scifi community there. Searles died in 1993 and Last continued to live in Montreal until his death in 2006.

== Bibliography ==
- The Science Fiction Quizbook - cowritten with Martin Last (1976)
- A Reader's Guide to Science Fiction - cowritten with Martin Last, Beth Meacham, and Michael Franklin (1979)
- A Reader's Guide to Fantasy - cowritten with Beth Meacham and Michael Franklin (1982)
- Films of Science Fiction and Fantasy (1988)
