= Rob Kampia =

American activist

Rob Kampia is an American activist who is the co-founder of the Marijuana Policy Project (MPP), co-founder of Decriminalize Sex Work (DSW), and founder of the Marijuana Leadership Campaign.

In 1988 Rob Kampia was arrested for growing marijuana for personal possession while attending Penn State University and served three months in prison. This experience led him to become a marijuana legalization activist. In 1993, Kampia moved to Washington D.C. to work with NORML (National Organization for the Reform of Marijuana Laws). He then formed MPP with Chuck Thomas and Mike Kirshner "when his relationship with NORML director Richard Cowan soured."

He served as MPP's executive director from 1995 until 2017, when he stepped down amid increasing public scrutiny of men accused of sexual misconduct and harassment. After resigning from MPP, in 2018, Kampia founded the Marijuana Leadership Campaign and co-founded DSW. Kampia continues to be a director at both organizations. Kampia "came out" as a client of sex workers to the Washington Examiner in 2019, saying "It's important, like the gay rights movement. ... If everyone knows someone who is gay, maybe being gay shouldn't be a hassle or a crime," Kampia said. "With this, anyone who has been engaged in paid sex, on the provider or the client side, should speak up and out themselves. I just outed myself to a reporter for the first time here."

== Early years and education ==
Kampia grew up in Harleysville, Pennsylvania, a small suburban town 30 miles (48 km) northwest of Philadelphia. Kampia was valedictorian of his 300-person graduating class at Souderton Area High School in 1986, served three months in prison from November 1989 to February 1990, for growing cannabis for personal use at Penn State University, and was elected student body president two years later at that same school. Three days after graduating with honors from Penn State in 1993 with a bachelor's degree in engineering science (a multidisciplinary honors program) and minor in English, he moved to Washington, D.C., for the purpose of ending the government's war on marijuana users.

== Marijuana Policy Project ==
Rob Kampia co-founded MPP in 1995. MPP has a lobbying branch, an educational branch, and a political action committee and is based in Washington, D.C. MPP employs approximately 40 staffers, as well as consultants to pass statewide ballot initiatives and lobbyists to pass legislation through state legislatures.

Kampia has been quoted in almost every major newspaper in the U.S., discussed the cannabis issue dozens of times on local and national radio, appeared on national TV more than a dozen times, and has testified before Congress on two occasions.

=== Sexual misconduct allegations (2009) ===
In August 2009, seven MPP staffers quit over an alleged incident of sexual misconduct by Kampia involving a female subordinate after an office happy hour. According to former employees, department heads at the organization unanimously asked Kampia to move into a different position than executive director over the incident. Following his statement that he was "hypersexualized," Kampia was "encouraged" by the MPP board of directors to take a three-month leave of absence and his return is subject to "convincing the board he has dealt with his issues." This reportedly resulted in a cancellation of the MPP's annual fundraiser at the Playboy Mansion, with MPP's acting director indicating that "the PR ramifications of holding the event right now are probably obvious." Kampia likened the incident to the Monica Lewinsky scandal, saying he could remain in charge just as Bill Clinton did.

In February 2018, "NCIA's Board of Directors voted to remove Rob Kampia in accordance with our bylaws after an ethics committee review surfaced a pattern of behavior unbecoming of a board member." Kampia labeled his ouster as a "coup" in an attempt to save face and spin some sort of public sympathy. This occurred soon after prominent NCIA board member Kayvan Khalatbari had resigned, in part, because the organization hadn't moved to reject Kampia sooner.

=== Arizona controversy ===
In March 2015, Rob Kampia threatened Gina Berman, an emergency room doctor and operator of The Giving Tree Wellness Center, a licensed medical marijuana dispensary in Phoenix. A leaked email stated that he would spend $10,000 to pay people for 1,000 hours of time to distribute literature outside of her front door that would not portray her favorably. This was triggered by philosophical differences regarding the 2016 legalization campaign between Kampia's organization and marijuana dispensary operators in Arizona. Berman issued a public response stating that if Kampia pursues the threat, "it is very likely that both MPP as an organization and you as an individual will be liable for tortuously interfering with business expectancies."

== Decriminalize Sex Work ==
Kampia co-founded DSW in 2018 with lawyer Melissa Broudo, social worker Crystal DeBoise, and activist and comedian Kaytlin Bailey. Initial funding was provided by Scott and Cyan Banister. In 2019, DSW filed a ballot initiative to decriminalize prostitution in Washington D.C., but pulled the initiative after push back from local sex worker activists who objected to collaborating with DSW and Kampia. "We know that this ballot initiative can be won, but we cannot and do not want to do it when local activists are not interested in collaborating with our organization," DSW said in a statement. In 2021, DSW supported the city initiative to remove prostitution related language from Burlington, Vermont's city charter, and funded the Ishtar Collective, a local sex worker activist organization. In New York state, DSW supported two legislative actions that were signed into law. One expands the ability of survivors of human trafficking to expunge their criminal records. The other abolished the "Walking While Trans" law. People can no longer be arrested for "loitering for the purpose of engaging in a prostitution offense," which DSW says "was used by police overwhelmingly to target trans persons of color." With support from DSW, New Hampshire and Vermont both enacted so-called "Good Samaritan" laws, which protect sex workers from arrest should they seek police protection from assault. In Rhode Island, DSW encouraged the House of Representatives to create a legislative study commission to review how laws impact sex workers.

== Notable appearances ==
In March 2001, Kampia testified before a subcommittee of the U.S. House of Representatives on the medical cannabis case that was pending before the U.S. Supreme Court at the time. As the only witness to advocate for the removal of criminal penalties for cannabis-using patients, Kampia was questioned intensely by all Republican subcommittee members in attendance, including Chairman Mark Souder (R-IN), who told Kampia, "You're an articulate advocate for an evil position." The hostile exchange between Kampia, Souder, and other members of Congress made national news.

On April 1, 2004, as an expert witness, Kampia testified before the US House Government Reform Subcommittee on "Criminal Justice, Drug Policy and Human Resources". The hearing was titled "Marijuana and Medicine: The Need for a Science Based Approach". Kampia told congress "...current federal policies are not based on science; rather, they are based on myths and lies. Worse yet, the federal government is currently blocking scientific inquiry into the therapeutic benefits of marijuana. This collusion in support of delusion is an outrage and must be stopped. State medical marijuana laws must be respected, and research into the therapeutic benefits of marijuana must be allowed to proceed expeditiously." Kampia attacked the federal government's medical cannabis policies, as well as subcommittee chairman Mark Souder (R-Ind.) – one of the House's most vehement opponents of medical cannabis. Kampia was the only anti-prohibitionist to testify at the hearing.

Kampia has debated the cannabis issue on national TV against then White House Deputy Drug Czar Andrea Barthwell, then-Congressman Bob Barr (R-GA) (who subsequently lobbied for MPP), then DEA administrator Asa Hutchinson, then California Attorney General Dan Lungren, and other prohibitionists.

Kampia has also discussed the cannabis issue on National Public Radio's Justice Talking with Margot Adler and – more recently in January 2006 – on NPR's All Things Considered.

== Electoral politics ==
Kampia ran for Washington D.C.'s congressional seat in 2000, as a member of the Libertarian Party. He was defeated by Eleanor Holmes Norton (D-DC). He supported former Congressman Bob Barr in the 2008 presidential election, saying that Barr was "the only presidential candidate who is in favor of reducing the size of the federal government while also supporting civil liberties."
