= Salomonsen =

Salomonsen is a surname. Notable people with the surname include:

- Finn Salomonsen (1909–1983), Danish ornithologist
- Grete Salomonsen (1951–2026), Norwegian film director
- Jone Salomonsen (early 21st c.), author of Enchanted Feminism
- Sanne Salomonsen (born 1955), Danish singer.
- Victor-Ray Salomonsen (early 21st c.), Danish musician in band Mnemic
