= Witchcraft and Paganism in Australia =

Book by Lynne Hume

- First edition cover
- Author: Lynne Hume
- Language: English
- Subject: Anthropology of religion Pagan studies
- Publisher: Melbourne University Press
- Publication date: 1997
- Publication place: Australia
- Media type: Print (hardback and paperback)
- Pages: 271
- ISBN: 978-0522847826

Witchcraft and Paganism in Australia is an anthropological study of the Wiccan and wider Pagan community in Australia. It was written by the Australian anthropologist Lynne Hume and first published in 1997 by Melbourne University Press.

Hume first encountered the Pagan movement in Canada, before beginning to explore Pagan groups in her native Australia.

== Background ==
=== Academic fieldwork into Paganism ===
Prior to Magliocco's work, multiple American researchers working in the field of Pagan studies had separately published investigations of the Pagan community in both the United States and the United Kingdom. The first of these had been the practising Wiccan, journalist and political activist Margot Adler in her Drawing Down the Moon: Witches, Druids, Goddess-Worshippers, and Other Pagans in America Today, which was first published by Viking Press in 1979. A second study was produced by the anthropologist Tanya M. Luhrmann in her Persuasions of the Witches' Craft: Ritual Magic in Contemporary England (1989), in which she focused on both a Wiccan coven and several ceremonial magic orders that were then operating in London. This was followed by the sociologist Loretta Orion's Never Again the Burning Times: Paganism Revisited (1995), which focused on Pagan communities on the American East Coast and Midwest.

=== Hume and her research ===
Lynne Hume had been born and raised into the Christian faith but maintained an interest in non-Christian beliefs and societies, becoming a religious pluralist and leading her to study the discipline of anthropology. Hume was introduced to the Pagan movement while in Canada during the early 1990s. Attending a Unitarian church in Calgary, it was here that a group of Wiccans had been invited to give a talk on their magico-religious practices during a Sunday morning service. Intrigued, she joined two separate Wiccan covens; one, known as the Daughters of the Moon, was exclusively for women, while the other was a mixed gender group. She remained in these groups for a year before returning to Australia in 1992. Back in her homeland, she began looking for Pagan groups here as well, encountering several Pagan individuals in Queensland before attending the second annual Pagan Summer Gathering (PSG), which was organised by the Church of All Worlds and held in the rural outskirts of Canberra. Although knowing nobody at the festival, she took part in the rituals which took place over the next five days, including a neoshamanic meditation, an runic women's rite, a tree planting ceremony and a Vodou-inspired ritual devoted to the goddess Oya.

"In publishing this book, I hope that I can dispel some of the fear surrounding the topic and convey a more accurate picture of this little-known movement in Australia."

— Lynne Hume, 1997.

In preparation for Witchcraft and Paganism in Australia, Hume spent five years among the Pagan community in both Canada and Australia, attending both private and public events including Sabbat festivals, workshops and conferences. She visited Wiccan covens in Western Australia, South Australia, New South Wales and Queensland, interviewing people both informally and formally. Immersing herself in the movement, she made many Pagan friends, noting that it became "not only a research project, but a highly enjoyable pastime." Alongside her active participation, Hume also made a study of most of the available literature on the subject, subscribing to Pagan newsletters and researching in the archives of the Canberra Occult Reference Centre, Murdoch University and at the Theosophical Society in Brisbane. She also sent out questionnaires through various Pagan newsletters and gatherings, attaining responses through a snowball sampling method.

== Synopsis ==
Chapter one, entitled "Doing is Knowing: Introduction and Approach", begins with an introduction to the new religious movement of contemporary Paganism. This is followed by Hume's discussion of how she first encountered and came to study the Pagan movement, while the chapter is then rounded off with a discussion of the anthropological methodology that she adopted in her investigation. The second chapter offers a brief historical outline of the Pagan and Wiccan movements, and their arrival in Australia. The third looks at commonly held beliefs in the Pagan community, such as their moral values, their respect for nature, and their cosmological views, while the fourth examines the organisation and structure of the movement, looking at how individuals and embrace and convert to it, and how Wiccan covens operate.

Chapter five offers an examination of rites of passage and the process of ritual in Paganism and Wicca, while the sixth looks at Pagan belief in magic. The following chapter discusses Pagan experiential and emotional experiences and beliefs regarding other realms, and the eighth looks at morality and ethics in the movement alongside its relation with legality. In her conclusion, Hume discusses the movement's attraction for those with feminist and environmentalist attitudes.

== Reviews ==
Emma Tomalin of Lancaster University reviewed the work for Nova Religio: The Journal of Alternative and Emergent Religions. Tomalin notes that Hume did not look specifically at the uniquely Australian features of contemporary Paganism, and tends toward being "descriptive rather than discursive", thereby appealing more to those "interested in an overview of contemporary Pagan belief and practice than those who wish to explore its wider political or social implications."

== See also ==
- Paganism in Australia
