= Barbara Krasnoff =

- Born: March 24, 1954 (age 72); Brooklyn, New York City, New York, USA
- Occupation: Author
- Writing career
- Genre: speculative fiction
- Website: krasnoff.wordpress.com

Barbara Sue Krasnoff is a tech editor and author of speculative fiction active in the field since 1989.

== Biography ==
Krasnoff, born in 1954, is a native of Brooklyn, New York, where she lives with her partner, radio host Jim Freund and "lots of toy penguins." In addition to her writing, she has served as features and reviews editor for Computerworld and reviews editor for the online technology news magazine The Verge.

== Literary career ==
Much of Krasnoff's fiction is part of a loose series "made up of interconnecti[ng] short stories about two uncanny families through several generations," which have been collected in the "mosaic novel" The History of Soul 2065. Krasnoff has been nominated for a Nebula Award.

Her work has appeared in various periodicals, including Amazing Stories, Abyss & Apex, Apex Magazine, Behind the Wainscot, Clockwork Phoenix, Cosmos, Crossed Genres, Descant, Doorways, Electric Velocipede, Escape Velocity, Lady Churchill's Rosebud Wristlet, Mythic Delirium, Perihelion, Space & Time, Sybil's Garage, Triptych Tales, and Weird Tales, and the anthologies Broken Time Blues: Fantastic Tales in the Roaring '20s, Clockwork Phoenix 2, Clockwork Phoenix 4, Clockwork Phoenix 5, Crossed Genres Year Two, Descended From Darkness: Apex Magazine Vol. I, Fat Girl in a Strange Land, Memories and Visions: Women's Fantasy and Science Fiction, Menial: Skilled Labor in Science Fiction, Nebula Awards Showcase 2018, Subversion: Science Fiction & Fantasy Tales of Challenging the norm, and Such A Pretty Face: Tales of Power & Abundance.

== Bibliography ==
=== Soul 2065 series ===
==== Collections ====
- The History of Soul 2065 (2019)

==== Short fiction ====
- "Stoop Ladies" (2000)
- "Lost Connections" (2002)
- "In the Loop" (2003)
- "Hearts and Minds" (2004)
- "In the Gingerbread House" (2009)
- "Waiting for Jakie" (2009)
- "Rosemary, That's For Remembrance" (2009)
- "Cancer God" (2009)
- "The Red Dybbuk" (2011)
- "The Sad Old Lady" (2013)
- "The History of Soul 2065" (2013)
- "Under the Bay Court Tree" (2014)
- "Sophia's Legacy" (2015)
- "Sabbath Wine" (2016)
- "The Ladder-Back Chair" (2017)
- "An Awfully Big Adventure" (2019)
- "Escape Route" (2019)
- "The Clearing in the Autumn" (2019)
- "Time and the Parakeet" (2019)

=== Other short fiction ===
- "Signs of Life" (1989)
- "Means of Communication" (2007)
- "An Old-Time Girl" (2007)
- "All His Worldly Goods" (2008)
- "The Seder Guest" (2010)
- "In the House of the Brelsh" (2011)
- "First Class" (2011)
- "Button Up Your Overcoat" (2011)
- "Marilee and the S. O. B." (2012)
- "The Didibug Pin" (2013)
- "Symbiosis" (2014)
- "Topfuntersetzer" (2014)
- "With Triumph Home unto Her House" (2016)
- "Hard Times, Cotton Mill Girl" (2018)
- "In the Background" (2018)
- "Blaming Caine" (2019)
- "The Clearing in the Spring" (2019)

=== Nonfiction ===
- Robots: Reel to Real (1982)

=== Interviews ===
- "Power Couples in the World of Speculative Fiction: Jim Freund and Barbara Krasnoff" (2019)

== Awards ==
"Sabbath Wine" was nominated for the 2017 Nebula Award for Best Short Story.
