= Hour of the Wolf (radio show) =

- Country of origin: United States
- Language(s): English
- Home station: WBAI
- Starring: Jim Freund
- Original release: 1972
- Website: www.hourwolf.com/toc.html

Hour of the Wolf is a long-running radio program devoted to speculative fiction. Named after the Ingmar Bergman film of the same title, the program was originally hosted and produced by Margot Adler in 1972. Since 1974 it has been hosted by Jim Freund on WBAI in New York.

Freund's guests on the show have included speculative fiction writers such as Douglas Adams, Isaac Asimov, Robert Bloch, Ray Bradbury, Octavia E. Butler, Arthur C Clarke, Lester Del Rey, Samuel R. Delany, Thomas M. Disch, Joe Haldeman, Frank Herbert, N. K. Jemisin, Christopher Lee, Ursula K. Le Guin, Frederik Pohl, Baird Searles, Norman Spinrad, Kurt Vonnegut, Gahan Wilson, Roger Zelazny, and many others.

The program ended its 38-year run in the Saturday 5-7 AM time slot on the morning of November 13, 2010, with Adler joining Freund for the occasion. In early December 2010 the show began a new run on early Thursday mornings from 1:30 - 3:00 AM. In February 2017 the slot was extended to run from 1:00 - 3:00 AM, returning its duration to two hours.

== Production ==
The show's intro music was composed by Peter Schickele. It was later used in the movie Silent Running. The program's customary outro music is "Sails of Silver", by Steeleye Span.
