= Sabina Magliocco =

American folklorist

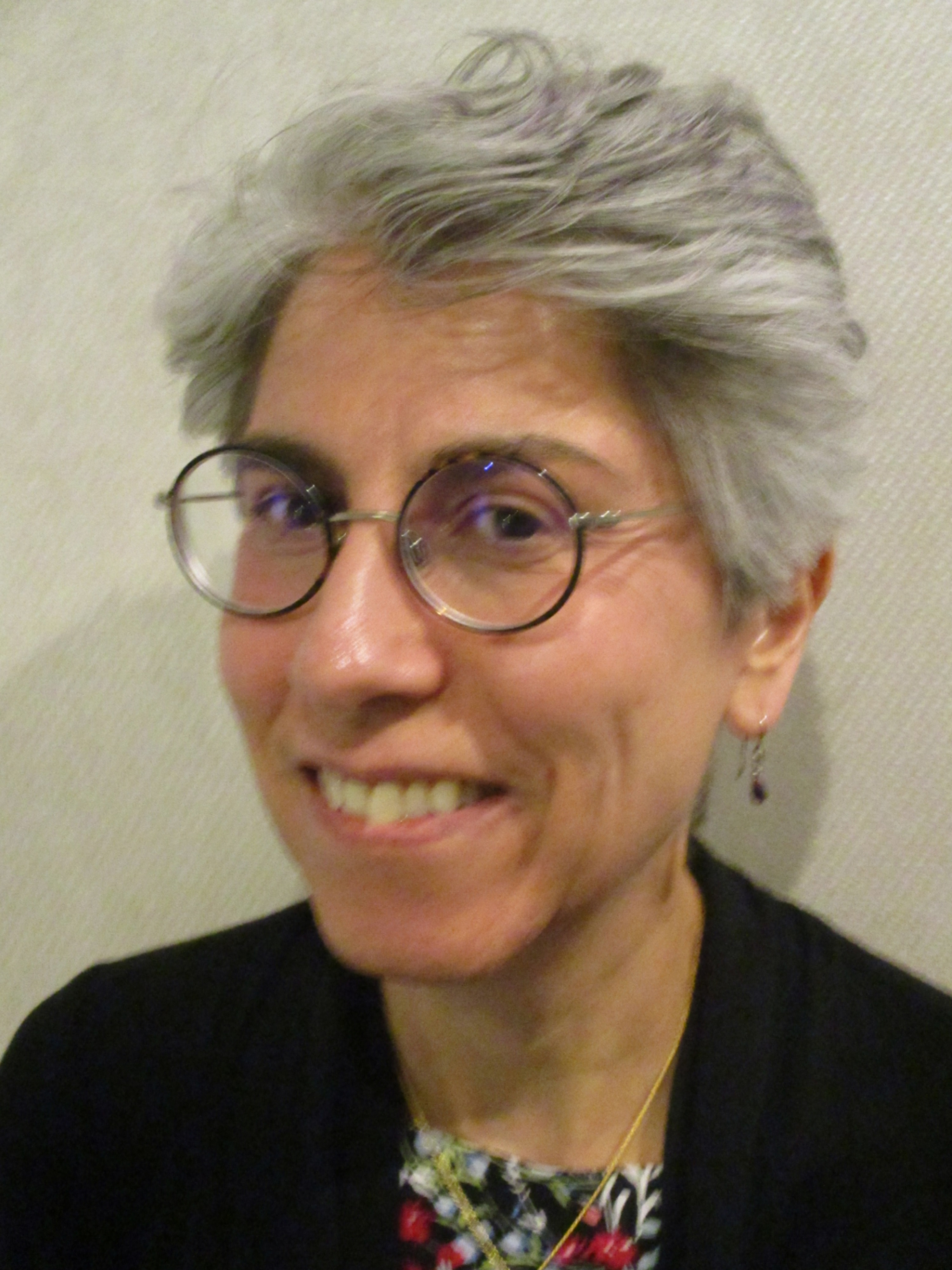
- Born: December 30, 1959 (age 66); Topeka, Kansas, U.S.

Academic background
- Education: Brown University; Indiana University Bloomington

Sabina Magliocco (born December 30, 1959) is a professor of anthropology and religion at the University of British Columbia and formerly at California State University, Northridge (CSUN). She is an author of non-fiction books and journal articles about folklore, religion, religious festivals, foodways, witchcraft and Neo-Paganism in Europe and the United States.

A recipient of fellowships from the John Simon Guggenheim Memorial Foundation, National Endowment for the Humanities, Fulbright Program and Hewlett Foundation, Magliocco is an honorary fellow of the American Folklore Society. From 2004 to 2009, she served as editor of Western Folklore, the quarterly journal of the Western States Folklore Society. At CSUN, she was faculty advisor for the CSUN Cat People, an organization dedicated to humane population control and maintenance of feral cats on the university's campus.

== Early life ==
Magliocco was born December 30, 1959, in Topeka, Kansas, the daughter of Italian immigrants. Her father first arrived in the United States in 1953 on a Fulbright Fellowship specializing in psychiatry and neurology. Her mother joined him after they were married in 1958. From 1960 to 1976, her family spent summers living in Italy, specifically Rome, San Felice Circeo, Lazio and Castiglione della Pescaia, Tuscany. Her family moved from Topeka to Cincinnati, Ohio, in 1966, where Magliocco graduated from Walnut Hills High School in 1977.

She graduated magna cum laude from Brown University in Providence, Rhode Island, in 1980 with a BA in anthropology. At Indiana University's Folklore Institute, Bloomington, Indiana, she received her MA (1983) and PhD (1988) in folklore, with a minor in anthropology.

== Career ==
After working on post-doctoral research in Italy with a Fulbright fellowship in 1989, Magliocco began her career teaching classes in Folklore and Anthropology. From 1990 to 1994, she taught at the University of Wisconsin–Madison. Her other teaching positions have included UCLA (1994), UC Santa Barbara (1995), UC Berkeley (1995–1997), and her current position at California State University, Northridge, where she taught from 1997 to 2017. She became the chair of the Department of Anthropology at Northridge in 2007. In 2017 she joined the Anthropology Department at the University of British Columbia in Vancouver, Canada, where she is Professor of Sociocultural Anthropology. Her teaching and research focuses on ritual, festival and religion; folklore and expressive culture (narrative and belief, vernacular healing, material culture); magic and witchcraft; modern Pagan religions; narrative; ethnic/regional/national identity issues; gender; cultural studies and critical theory; animal studies; and ethnographic methodology and writing.

== Fieldwork and research interests ==
Magliocco did fieldwork in northwestern Sardinia (Italy) during the 1980s, studying the effect of socio-economic transformation on the traditional festivals of a pastoral highland community. The Two Madonnas and Le due Marie di Bessude were the result of this research. Magliocco's studies of contemporary Neopagans in the San Francisco Bay Area provided the subject material for Witching Culture and Neo-Pagan Sacred Art and Altars. In Cornwall, England, her fieldwork on the Padstow May Day celebration was used to produce Oss Tales. Magliocco is currently working on a project based on traditional healing practices in Italy.

She has written several journal articles that have had significant impact on modern scholarship about witchcraft and the American revival of Italian-American Stregheria. Magliocco is an initiate of Gardnerian Wicca.

From 2012 to 2014, Magliocco made appearances on 17 episodes of the History Channel series, Ancient Aliens, as a commentator speaking about folkloric concepts related to the theme of each episode. She also appeared as a commentator on three episodes of the Scary Tales television series in 2011.

== Awards ==
(2016) Fellow, Nature, Art, and Habitat Writing Residency Taleggio, Italy

(2004) Honorary Fellow, American Folklore Society

(2001) National Endowment for the Humanities Research Fellowship

(1996) John Simmon Guggenheim Memorial Fellowship

(1994) Chicago Folklore Prize

(1989) Fullbright Post-Doctoral Research Grant, Italy

(1985) Fullbright-Hayes Doctoral Research Grant, Italy

== Bibliography ==
=== Books ===
- Witching Culture: Folklore and Neo-Paganism in America (University of Pennsylvania Press, 2004)
- Neo-Pagan Sacred Art and Altars: Making Things Whole (University of Mississippi Press, 2001)
- Le due Marie di Bessude: festa e transformazione sociale in Sardegna (Ozieeri, Italy: Edizioni Il Torchietto, 1995)
- The Two Madonnas: the Politics of Festival in a Sardinian Community (1993; 2nd Edition, Waveland Press, 2005)

=== Film ===
- Oss Tales & Oss Oss Wee Oss Redux: Beltane in Berkeley (with John Melville Bishop; Media-Generation, 2007)

=== Significant articles ===
- "Aradia in Sardinia: the Archeology of a Folk Character," in D. Green and D. Evans, ed., Ten Years of Triumph of the Moon: Essays in Honor of Ronald Hutton, 40–60. Bristol, UK: Hidden Publishing, 2009.
- "Italian American Stregheria and Wicca: Ethnic Ambivalence in American Neopaganism," in Modern Paganism in World Cultures: Comparative Perspectives, ed. by Michael Strmiska (Santa Barbara, CA: ABC-CLIO, 2006), 55–86.
