= Sarah M. Pike =

American academic

- Occupations: professor, Author, and Scholar

Academic background
- Education: PhD, (with distinction) Religious Studies, Indiana University (PhD minor, Women's Studies), 1998 MA, Religious Studies, Indiana University Bloomington, 1989 BA, cum laude, Religion, Duke University, 1983
- Alma mater: Indiana University, Duke University
- Doctoral advisor: Robert Orsi

Academic work
- Discipline: Comparative Religion
- Institutions: California State University, Chico

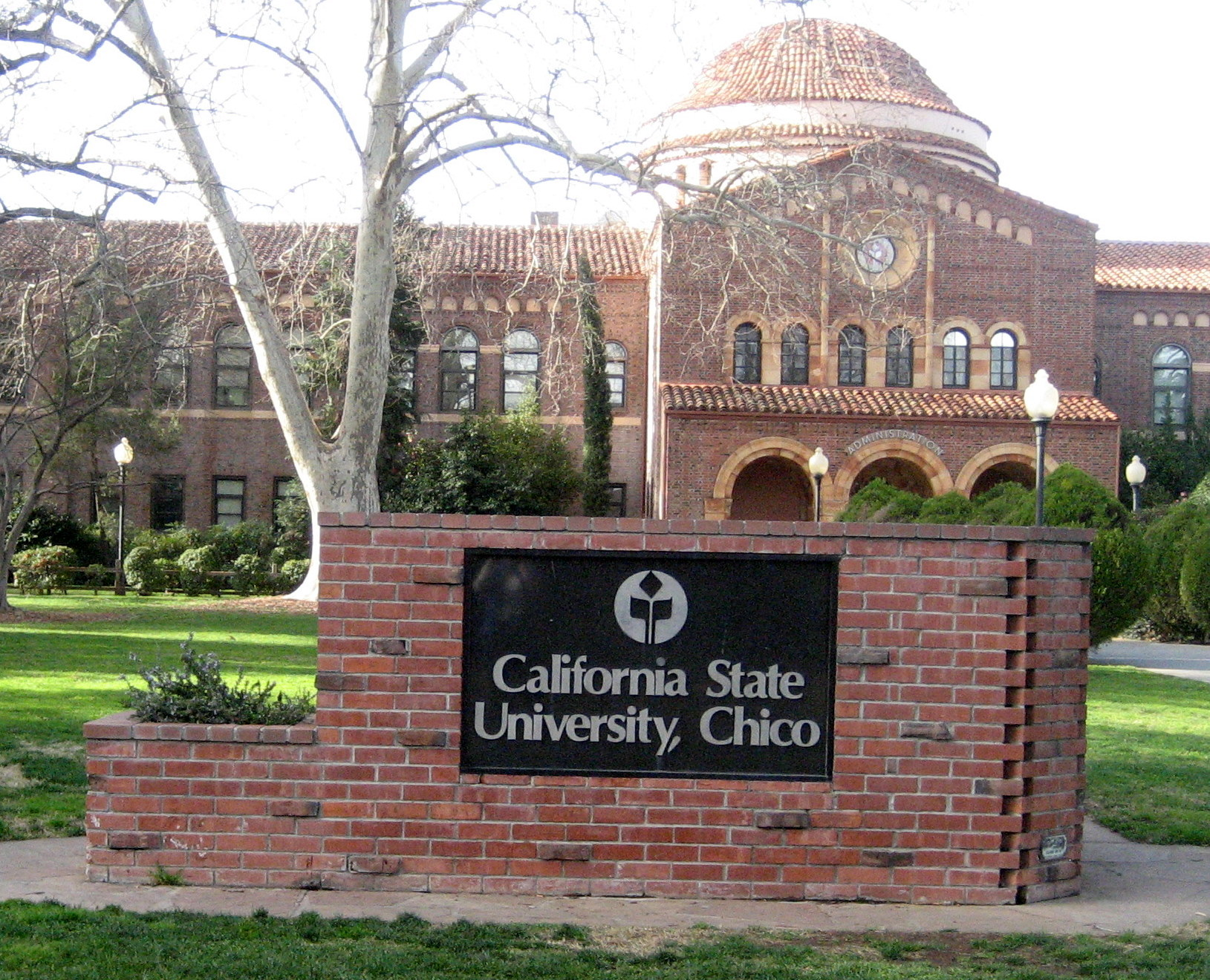
California State University, Chico campus site.

Sarah M. Pike is an American author and professor of comparative religion in the Department of Religious studies at California State University, Chico. Her interests include paganism, environmentalism, religion and ecology, and ritual studies. Her research on neopaganism and radical environmentalism has been lauded as being significant to the study of festival and group behaviour. She is the president of the International Society for the Study of Religion, Nature, and Culture, co-chair of the American Academy of Religion, Ritual Studies Group, and director of the California State University, Chico Humanities Center.

== Education ==
Pike completed her Bachelor of Arts, cum laude, in Religion at Duke University in 1983. She earned her Master of Arts and PhD (with distinction) in Religious studies from Indiana University Bloomington in 1989 and 1998 respectively. Her doctoral advisor was Robert Orsi. During her time at Indiana University Bloomington, Pike extensively observed and involved herself within local (Midwestern) neopagan communities and gatherings as part of her field research.

== Publications ==
=== Books ===
Pike's most recent book titled For the Wild: Ritual and Commitment in Radical Eco-Activism covers issues regarding the demonization of radical environmentalists and how religious studies translate into nature and ecology. She explores the motivations for those who partake in risky and illegal behaviour to protest against the destruction of natural habitats and forestry. Her first book, Earthly Bodies, Magical Selves, primarily focuses on neopagan festival behaviours including witchcraft, magic, Spiritualist gatherings, as well as individual and group identity. In her book, New Age and Neopagan Religions in America, Pike sees members of neopagan religions as placing high emphasis on ritual practice as a way of shaping individual and group identities, having significant connections with nature, and understanding God as a living entity.

- Pike, Sarah M. (2017) For the Wild: Ritual and Commitment in Radical Eco-Activism, Berkeley and Los Angeles: University of California Press. ISBN 9780520294950
- Pike, Sarah M. (2004) New Age and Neopagan Religions in America, New York: Columbia University Press. ISBN 0231124023
- Pike, Sarah M. (2001) Earthly Bodies, Magical Selves: Contemporary Pagans and the Search for Community, Berkeley and Los Angeles: University of California Press. ISBN 9780520923805

=== Selected articles and book chapters ===
Pike has written several articles and book chapters on topics such as Burning Man, neopaganism, rituals, environmentalism, youth spirituality, New religious movement and animal rights activism. Her work also includes Wiccan ritual practices pertaining to sexuality, polyamory, and marriage.

| Year | Journal/Book | Article/Chapter |
|---|---|---|
| 2018 | Bloomsbury Handbook of Religion and Nature, edited by Laura Hobgood and Whitney Bauman. London: Bloomsbury. | "Feral Becoming and Environmentalism's Primal Future” |
| 2016 | Journal for the Study of Religion, Nature and Culture | "Mourning Nature: The Work of Grief in Radical Environmentalism” |
| 2016 | Spiritualizing the City: Agency and Resilience of the Urbanesque Habitat, edited by Victoria Hegner and Peter Jan Margry (New York: Routledge) | "The Dance Floor as Urban Altar: How Ecstatic Dancers Transform the Lived Experience of Cities” |
| 2014 | Social Science Research Council Forum, “Reverberations: New Directions in the Study of Prayer." | "Sweating Our Prayers in Dance Church" |
| 2014 | Religion and the Marketplace in the U.S., edited by Detlef Junker, Jan Stievermann, and Philip Goff. London and New York: Oxford University Press | "Selling Infinite Selves: Youth Culture and Contemporary Festivals” |
| 2013 | Social Science Research Council Forum, “Reverberations: New Directions in the Study of Prayer.” | "Prayer and Presence in Unexpected Places” |
| 2012 | The Oxford Handbook of Religion and the American News Media, edited by Diane Winston. London and New York: Oxford University Press | "Witchcraft Since the 1960s” |
| 2011 | Children and Religion: A Methods Handbook, edited by Susan B. Ridgely. New York: New York University Press | "Religion and Youth Culture” |
| 2010 | God in the Details: American Religion in Popular Culture, edited by Katherine McCarthy and Eric Mazur. New York: Routledge, Inc. | "Desert Goddesses and Apocalyptic Art: Making Sacred Space at the Burning Man Festival" |
| 2010 | Weinhold, J. & Samuel G. (eds.) "The Varieties of Ritual Experience," in Ritual Dynamics and the Science of Ritual. Volume II – Body, Performance, Agency and Experience, ed. by Axel Michaels et al. Wiesbaden, Germany: Harrassowitz | "Performing Grief in Formal and Informal Rituals at the Burning Man Festival” |
| 2009 | Journal of the American Academy of Religion, 77: 647–672. | "Dark Teens and Born-Again Martyrs: Captivity Narratives After Columbine” |
| 2008 | Key Words in the Study of Media and Religion, edited by David Morgan. New York: Routledge | "Religion” |
| 2006 | Teaching New Religious Movements, edited by David G. Bromley. New York and Oxford: Oxford University Press | "Men and Women in New Religious Movements: Constructing Alternative Gender Roles” |
| 2004 | Researching Paganisms, edited by Jenny Blain, Doug Ezzy and Graham Harvey. Walnut Creek, CA: Altamira Press | "Gleanings from the Field: Leftover Tales of Grief and Desire” |

== Awards and recognition ==
=== Selected position ===
- board of directors, American Academy of Religion
- board of directors, International Society for the Study of Religion, Nature, and Culture
- Chair, American Academy of Religion's Committee for the Public Understanding of Religion
- Chair, Department of Comparative Religion and Humanities, California State University, Chico

=== Awards ===
| Year | Award/Grant |
|---|---|
| 2015 | Visiting Scholar, University of Oslo |
| 2013 to 2017 | Norwegian Research Council multiyear grant for international collaborative project |
| 1999 | American Academy of Religion Individual Research Grant to aid in publication of Earthly Bodies, Magical Selves. |

== See also ==
- Drawing Down the Moon (book)
- Neopaganism in the United States
- Radical environmentalism
- Religion and environmentalism
- Spiritual ecology
- Starwood Festival
- Wiccan morality
- Wiccan views of divinity
