= Lynne Hume =

Australian anthropologist and academic

- Occupations: Anthropologist, academic

Academic background
- Education: University of Queensland; University of Calgary
- Thesis: Yarrabah, Christian phoenix: Christianity and social change on an Australian Aboriginal reserve (1990)
- Doctoral advisor: Ian Keen

Academic work
- Discipline: Anthropology
- Sub-discipline: Anthropology of religion
- Institutions: University of Queensland
- Website: hpi.uq.edu.au/profile/437/lynne-hume

Lynne Hume is an Australian anthropologist of religion whose research interests include Australian Aboriginal spirituality, paganism, consciousness studies and religious dress. She is an Honorary Associate Professor in Studies in Religion at the University of Queensland.

== Education ==
Hume was born in 1940. She completed a bachelor of arts and Master of Arts degrees at the University of Calgary. Her masters thesis was an analysis of a women's pig-killing ritual on Maewo, Vanuatu. She went on to complete a doctor of philosophy degree at the University of Queensland. Her doctoral thesis, titled "Yarrabah, Christian phoenix: Christianity and social change on an Australian Aboriginal reserve", was completed in the School of Social Sciences in 1990.

== Career ==
Hume has taught in Canada and Australia, primarily in the areas of anthropology of religion and spirituality. She is an Honorary Associate Professor in Studies in Religion at the University of Queensland. She has published in areas including paganism, anthropology and the senses; religion and dress; consciousness studies; autoethnography; and convict women in Tasmania in the 1830s. Her book Witchcraft and Paganism in Australia, which is an anthropological study of the Wiccan and wider pagan community in Australia, was first published by Melbourne University Press in 1997. It was the first full academic discourse of paganism in Australia. One reviewer wrote that "Hume did not look specifically at the uniquely Australian features of contemporary Paganism, and tends toward being "descriptive rather than discursive", thereby appealing more to those "interested in an overview of contemporary Pagan belief and practice than those who wish to explore its wider political or social implications".

Hume's book Ancestral Power: The Dreaming, Consciousness and Aboriginal Australians was published by Melbourne University Press in 2002. It examines how Aboriginal spirituality can offer the non-Indigenous reader insights into "different dimensions of consciousness and other ways of experiencing the world".

Hume is on the editorial board of the Journal of Contemporary Religion, Fieldwork in Religion, and Australian Religion Studies Review. She has been interviewed by the Australian Broadcasting Corporation's Radio National program about topics including popular spiritualities, pre-Christian paganism, the future of religion and fashion and faith.

== Selected publications ==
=== Books ===
- Hume, Lynne (2018). Strumpets of the worst kind. Brisbane, Australia: Boolarong Press.
- Hume, Lynne and Drury, Nevill (2013). The varieties of magical experience: indigenous, medieval, and modern magic. Santa Barbara, CA, United States: ABC-CLIO.
- Hume, Lynne (2013). The religious life of dress: global fashion and faith. London, United Kingdom: Bloomsbury Academic.
- Hume, L. L. (2007). Portals: Opening Doorways To Other Realities Through The Senses. Oxford, UK: Berg.
- Hume, Lynne (2002). Ancestral power: the Dreaming, consciousness and aboriginal Australians. Melbourne University Press, Melbourne. ISBN 9780522850123
- Hume, Lynne (1997). Witchcraft and Paganism in Australia. Melbourne University Press. ISBN 978-0-522-84782-6

=== Book chapters ===
- Hume, Lynne (2022). Spiritual Black. Little black dress: a radical fashion. edited by Georgina Ripley. Edinburgh: National Museums of Scotland Enterprises Publishing.
- Hume, Lynne (2021). Dress and anthropology. Dress in Mediterranean antiquity: Greeks, Romans, Jews, Christians. (pp. 27–39) edited by Alicia J. Batten and Kelly Olsen. London, United Kingdom: Bloomsbury. doi:10.5040/9780567684677.ch-004
- Hume, Lynne (2018). Religious Dress. The International Encyclopedia of Anthropology. edited by Hilary Callan. New York, United States: John Wiley and Sons. doi:10.1002/9781118924396.wbiea2406
- Hume, Lynne (2012). Lifting the veil: an emic approach to magical practice. Pathways in modern western magic. (pp. 19–36) edited by Nevill Drury. Richmond, CA, United States: Concrescent Scholars.
- Hume, Lynne (2010). Dress and religious practices. Encyclopedia of world dress and fashion. (pp. 77–84) edited by Joanne Bubolz Eicher. Oxford, United Kingdom: Oxford University Press.
- Hume, Lynne (2009). Indigenous traditions of Oceania and Australasia. The world's religions: Continuities and transformations. (pp. 290–291) edited by Peter B. Clarke and Peter Beyer. London, England, U.K.: Routledge.

=== Journal articles ===
- Hume, Lynne (2019). Anthropology and religion studies: A personal and academic symbiosis. Journal for the Academic Study of Religion, 32 (2-3), 166–181. doi:10.1558/jasr.39604
- Hume, Lynne (2007). The anthropology of emerging religions. Nueva Anthropologia, 20 (67), 119–140.
- Hume, Lynne (2004). Accessing the eternal: Dreaming "The Dreaming" and ceremonial performance. Zygon: Journal of Religion and Science, 39 (1), 237–258. doi:10.1111/j.1467-9744.2004.00568.x
