= Justice Talking =

- Genre: Talk
- Running time: 50 minutes
- Country of origin: United States
- Home station: National Public Radio
- Starring: Margot Adler
- Original release: 1999 – 2008
- No. of episodes: 349
- Website: http://www.justicetalking.org/

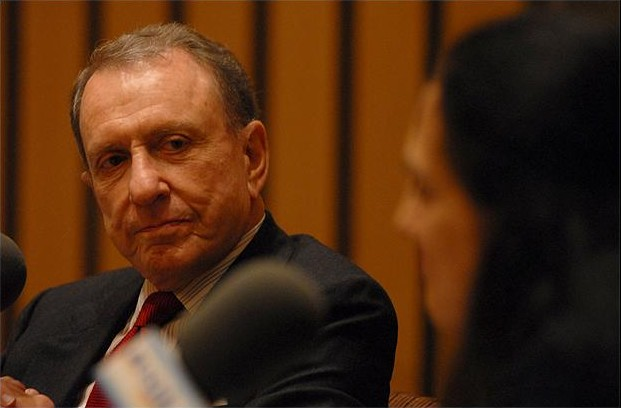
Arlen Specter while he was being interviewed by Margot Adler for an episode of Justice Talking on Presidential Signing statements

Justice Talking was a weekly radio show, syndicated on National Public Radio and hosted by Margot Adler, that tackled the law and public policy. A signature element of the program was its debate segment.

It was the flagship of a multi-media civic education initiative online, in print and in classrooms. Justice Talking was produced by the Annenberg Public Policy Center, a think tank at the University of Pennsylvania's School for Communications.

Justice Talking's last show aired on June 30, 2008. According to the producer, the program has ceased production due to lack of funding.

== Justice Learning web site ==
Justice Talking has a partnership with The New York Times Learning Network to produce a free website for students and teachers that discusses legal debates that affect Americans. It is called Justice Learning.
