= Wiccaning =

Neopagan ritual analogous to infant baptism

A Wiccaning or Paganing is a Neopagan ritual analogous to the christening or baptism of an infant. Specific groups may have alternate names for this rite.

In accordance with the importance put on free will in Neopagan traditions, infants are not necessarily expected to choose a Pagan path for themselves when they grow older. The ceremony, like its Christian equivalent, is focused on the parents' beliefs and the family's communal commitment to look after the child.

== Rites ==
A Wiccaning can take many forms, drawn from older pagan traditions, folklore, and the more modern beliefs of the individuals involved. In most the central event is the presentation of the infant to a God and Goddess usually through being held up by its Mother, a High Priest, and/or High Priestess in sight of the sky.

Other aspects of the ritual may include sprinkling silvered water on the infant's forehead as part of a saining (Scottish rite for blessing and consecrating) or passing the child over a fire.
