= Jim Freund =

American radio host (born 1954)

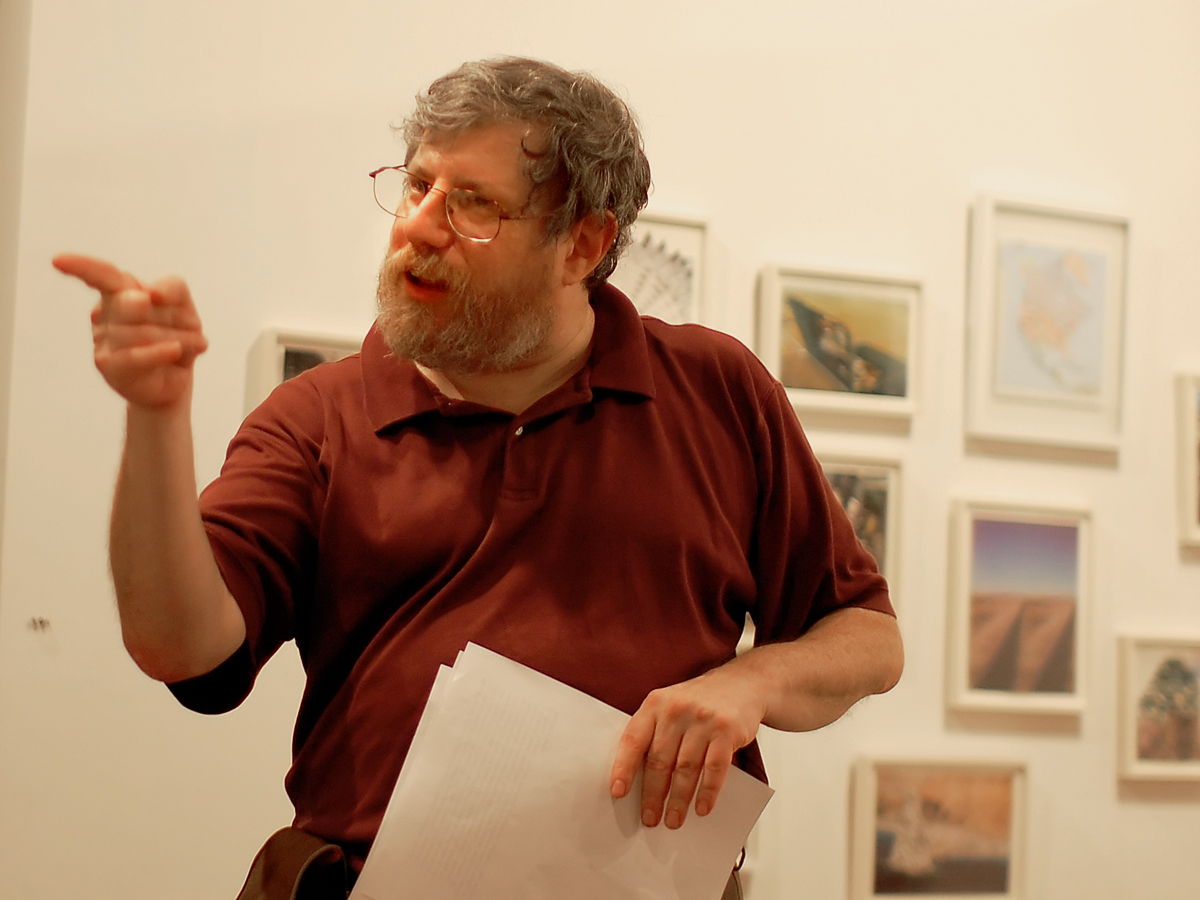
Jim Freund

Jim Freund (born 1954) is a radio personality and a prominent figure in the speculative fiction community as host of the Pacifica Radio show Hour of the Wolf and as curator of the New York Review of Science Fiction Reading Series.

== Biography ==
Freund lives in Brooklyn, New York with his partner, speculative fiction writer and tech editor Barbara Krasnoff and "lots of toy penguins."

== Career ==
As host and producer of Hour of the Wolf (created by Margot Adler), which has aired on WBAI in New York City since 1974, Freund has presented the work of and interviewed many major figures in speculative fiction. As curator of the New York Review of Science Fiction Reading Series he has been responsible for the presentation of a long-running series of live readings by major figures of speculative fiction.

He also has a deep interest in the stage and has produced three plays off-off-Broadway.
