= Never Again the Burning Times =

1995 book by Loretta Orion

Never Again the Burning Times: Paganism Revisited
- The front cover to the book.
- Author: Loretta Orion
- Language: English
- Subject: Anthropology of religion Pagan studies
- Publisher: Waveland
- Publication date: 1995
- Publication place: United States
- Media type: Print (Paperback)
- Pages: 322
- ISBN: 978-0-88133-835-5

Never Again the Burning Times: Paganism Revisited is an anthropological study of the Wiccan and wider Pagan community in the United States. It was written by the American anthropologist Loretta Orion (1944-2022) and published by Waveland Press in 1995.

The reviews published in specialist academic journals were largely negative, and while accepting that Orion had made note of some interesting insights, they criticized her for promoting and defending, rather than analyzing, the religious movement that she was discussing, something that they attributed to her openly Pagan beliefs.

== Background ==
=== Paganism and Wicca in the United States ===
Contemporary Paganism, which is also referred to as Neo-Paganism, is an umbrella term used to identify a wide variety of modern religious movements, particularly those influenced by or claiming to be derived from the various pagan beliefs of pre-modern Europe. The religion of Pagan Witchcraft, or Wicca, was developed in England during the first half of the 20th century and is one of several Pagan religions. The figure at the forefront of Wicca's early development was the English occultist Gerald Gardner (1884–1964), the author of Witchcraft Today (1954) and The Meaning of Witchcraft (1959) and the founder of a tradition known as Gardnerian Wicca. Gardnerian Wicca revolved around the veneration of both a Horned God and a Mother Goddess, the celebration of eight seasonally-based festivals in a Wheel of the Year and the practice of magical rituals in groups known as covens. Gardnerianism was subsequently brought to the U.S. in the early 1960s by an English initiate, Raymond Buckland (1934–2017), and his then-wife Rosemary, who together founded a coven in Long Island.

In the U.S., new variants of Wicca developed, including Dianic Wicca, a tradition founded in the 1970s which was influenced by second wave feminism, emphasized female-only covens, and rejected the veneration of the Horned God. One initiate of both the Dianic and Gardnerian traditions was a woman known as Starhawk (1951–) who went on to found her own tradition, Reclaiming Wicca, as well as publishing The Spiral Dance: a Rebirth of the Ancient Religion of the Great Goddess (1979), a book which helped spread Wicca throughout the U.S.

=== Academic fieldwork into Paganism ===
Prior to Berger's work, several American researchers working in the field of Pagan studies had separately published investigations of the Pagan community in both the United States and the United Kingdom. The first of these had been the practicing Wiccan, journalist and political activist Margot Adler in her Drawing Down the Moon: Witches, Druids, Goddess-Worshippers, and Other Pagans in America Today, which was first published by Viking Press in 1979.

A second study was produced by the anthropologist Tanya M. Luhrmann in her Persuasions of the Witch's Craft: Ritual Magic in Contemporary England (1989), in which she focused on both a Wiccan coven and several ceremonial magic orders that were then operating in London.

== Reception and recognition ==
=== Academic reviews ===
"It is essentially a text more concerned with promoting and defending this religious movement than it is a sociological analysis of it. This is probably inevitable. As Alistaire Maclntryre once observed, believers in a religious system cannot easily analyze that system sociologically or anthropologically."
T.O. Beidelman, 1995.

In a largely negative review published in the Anthropos journal, T.O. Beidelman called Never Again the Burning Times a "contradictory work", believing that whilst it was "fascinating" as "a compilation of ethnographic material describing what many neopagans in contemporary America believe and do", he also felt that "as a social analysis" it was "very muddled". Expressing concern over Orion's Pagan beliefs and the influence that these had over her study, he felt that much of the logic used in the book was "weak", and that her "analytical efforts" were "equally unsatisfactory". Furthermore, he argued that whilst "it is always helpful for a researcher to have sympathy with any group she or he studies", Orion's study was "more a missionary tract than social analysis", with an emphasis on portraying the contemporary Pagan movement in a positive light. Ultimately, Beidelman felt that he "cannot recommend this as a sociological or anthropological analysis or even as a reliable historical account of the origins or meaning of beliefs about witches in anthropology or in Western culture in general." Nonetheless, he did feel that he can "warmly recommend this as an absorbing account of what one educated and thoughtful person may think after being converted to contemporary neopagan beliefs and having joined such a religious movement."

The anthropologist Tanya Luhrmann (1959–) of the University of California, San Diego – who had previously authored Persuasions of the Witches' Craft: Ritual Magic in Contemporary England (1989) – also published a predominantly negative review of the book, this time in the Journal of Anthropological Research, in which she also reviewed another study of Wicca that had been published in the mid-1990s, Allen Scarboro, Nancy Campbell and Shirley Stave's Living Witchcraft: A Contemporary American Coven. Describing Never Again the Burning Times, Luhrmann stated that it was "an insider's book with a scholar's surface, and while it has the appeal of an apologia, it also has the gullibility of a book on the occult rather than a distanced perspective on it." She proceeded to discuss how Orion "writes as if she uncritically accepted the practitioners' understanding of their history and their actions", criticizing Orion's belief in magic as a real physical force. Luhrmann goes on to cast a critical eye on many of Orion's claims, believing that many of her statements have a "naive, unscholarly feel" and states her surprise that in the book Orion "implies that pagan healing is more effective than modern medicine". On a more positive note, Luhrmann comments that "Orion paints a good and interesting portrait of witchcraft" that contains some "important data", with particular praise for Orion's discussion of the issue of "how our fantasy life relates to our mental health".
