= Drawing Down the Moon (book) =

1979 book by Margot Adler

Drawing Down the Moon: Witches, Druids, Goddess-Worshippers, and Other Pagans in America Today
- The first edition cover of the book.
- Author: Margot Adler
- Language: English
- Subject: Sociology of religion, History of religion
- Publisher: Viking Press
- Publication date: 1979
- Publication place: United States
- Media type: Print (Hardcover & Paperback)
- OCLC: 515560
- Dewey Decimal: 299.94
- LC Class: BF1573

Drawing Down the Moon: Witches, Druids, Goddess-Worshippers, and Other Pagans in America Today is a sociological study of contemporary Paganism in the United States written by the American Wiccan and journalist Margot Adler. First published in 1979 by Viking Press, it was later republished in a revised and expanded edition by Beacon Press in 1986, with third and fourth revised editions being brought out by Penguin Books in 1996 and then 2006 respectively.

According to The New York Times, the book "is credited with both documenting new religious impulses and being a catalyst for the panoply of practices now in existence" and "helped popularize earth-based religions." Adler was a Neopagan and "recognized witch" herself and a reporter for National Public Radio.

The book is an examination of Neopaganism in the United States from a sociological standpoint, discussing the history and various forms of the movement. It contains excerpts from many interviews with average Pagans, as well as with well-known leaders and organizers in the community.

The first edition of the book sold 30,000 copies. Successive versions have included over one hundred and fifty pages of additional text and an updated contacts section. It has been praised by Theodore Roszak, Susan Brownmiller, The New York Times Book Review and the Journal of the American Academy of Religion.

== Background ==
=== Paganism and Wicca in the United States ===
Contemporary Paganism, which is also referred to as Neo-Paganism, is an umbrella term used to identify a wide variety of modern religious movements, particularly those influenced by or claiming to be derived from the various pagan beliefs of pre-modern Europe. The religion of Pagan Witchcraft, or Wicca, is one of a number of different Pagan religions, and developed in England during the first half of the 20th century. The figure at the forefront of Wicca's early development was the English occultist Gerald Gardner (1884–1964), the author of Witchcraft Today (1954) and The Meaning of Witchcraft (1959) and the founder of a tradition known as Gardnerian Wicca. Gardnerian Wicca revolved around the veneration of both a Horned God and a Mother Goddess, the celebration of eight seasonally-based festivals in a Wheel of the Year and the practice of magical rituals in groups known as covens. Gardnerianism was subsequently brought to the U.S. in the early 1960s by an English initiate, Raymond Buckland (1934–2017), and his then-wife Rosemary, who together founded a coven in Long Island.

In the U.S., new variants of Wicca developed, including Dianic Wicca, a tradition founded in the 1970s which was heavily influenced by second wave feminism, rejecting the veneration of the Horned God and emphasizing female-only covens. One initiate of both the Dianic and Gardnerian traditions, who used the pseudonym of Starhawk (1951-), later founded her own tradition, Reclaiming Wicca, as well as publishing The Spiral Dance: a Rebirth of the Ancient Religion of the Great Goddess (1979), through which she helped to spread Wicca throughout the U.S.

=== Adler and her research ===
In 1976, Adler publicly announced that Viking Press had offered her a book contract to undertake the first wide-ranging study of American Paganism.

== Synopsis ==
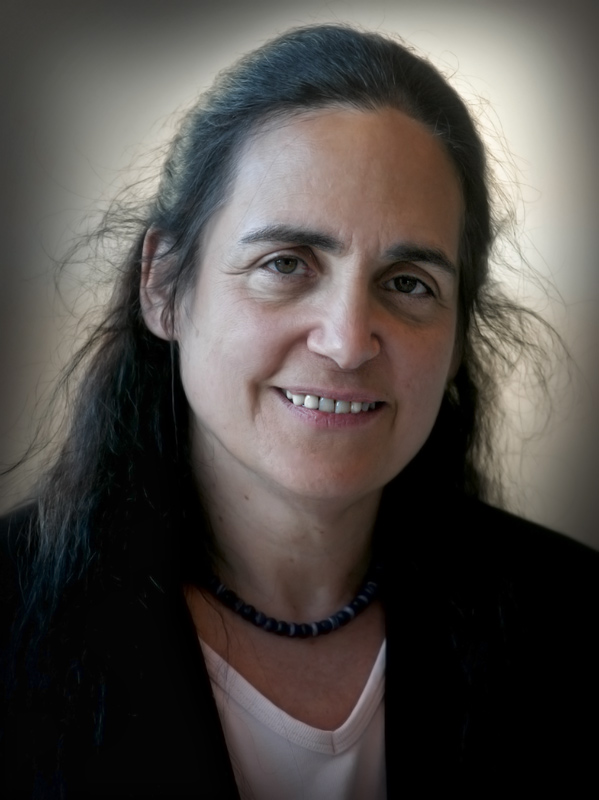
Margot Adler in 2004.

Drawing Down the Moon chronicles the rise and diversification of contemporary Pagan religions across the United States from the mid‑1970s through the early 2000s. Adler divides her narrative into three broad phases:

- Origins and Foundations (Chapters 1–4): Adler traces the history of Neopaganism back to European occult revivals and the birth of Wicca under Gerald Gardner, then follows its transplantation to North America via figures like Raymond Buckland and Zsuzsanna Budapest. She profiles early covens, the role of feminist spirituality, and the publication of key works such as The Spiral Dance (1979) .
- Community Building (Chapters 5–8): Drawing on extensive interviews, Adler paints vivid portraits of regional gatherings (e.g., Pagan Spirit Gathering), coven life, and the emergence of specialized traditions—Dianic, Alexandrian, Reclaiming, and Heathenry. She highlights key festivals, ritual innovations, and the role of print and mail networks in fostering a national movement .
- Institutionalization and Diversity (Chapters 9–12): Adler examines how Paganism matured into a pluralistic constellation of schools, from GreenCraft ecology‑focused covens to reconstructionist Heathen groups. She addresses internal debates over gender, race, and authenticity, and surveys Pagan involvement in ecological activism and interfaith dialogue .

== Republication ==
=== 1986 revision ===
In 1986, Adler published a revised second edition of Drawing Down the Moon, much expanded with new information. Identifying several new trends that had occurred in American Paganism since 1979, Adler recognized that in the intervening seven years, U.S. Pagans had become increasingly self-aware of Paganism as a movement, something which she attributed to the increasing number of Pagan festivals. One reviewer noted that the alterations made for the 1986 edition "often creates a vivid contrast with events and persons first described in 1979."

=== 1996 revision ===
In the 1996 third edition, Adler added over 150 pages of new material to reflect seven years of growth and change in the Pagan movement:

- Expanded tradition profiles: New sections on GreenCraft, Afro‑Diasporic Paganisms, and the rise of online Pagan networking.
- Interfaith engagement: A chapter on Pagan representation at world religious conferences, documenting the formation of the Council of Interfaith Communities .
- Demographic data: Inclusion of the first mailed survey results estimating U.S. Pagan population at 150,000–250,000, from a 1994 National Census of Pagan Religions conducted by the Association of Round Table Pagans .
- Reflections on growth challenges: Discussion of organizational fragmentation, commercialization of Witchcraft paraphernalia, and debates over political activism within Pagan circles .

These additions cemented the book's status as the definitive sociological survey of American Paganism in the late 20th century

=== 2006 revision ===
The 2006 edition includes a new section on Greencraft (pp. 127–129), a Wiccan tradition emerging out of an Alexandrian Wicca coven, which features its own rune alphabet and a non-Hebrew form of Kabbalah based on work by Neopagan author R. J. Stewart; it emphasizes the practice of Wicca as a nature religion and as a mystery religion. It also gives a more complete and sympathetic treatment of the Northern European Neopagan revivals grouped under the rubric "Heathenism," which she admits to having consciously omitted from the first edition because of discomfort with the more conservative social values of this form of Pagan revival, and because some far-right and even neo-Nazi groups were using it as a front for their activities at the time (pp. 286–296). And she prefaces her chapter "Women, Feminism, and the Craft," which discusses the emergence of feminist forms of Neopaganism, with discussion of how her personal feelings about such groups have changed, but "decided to leave the chapter pretty much as is, with a few minor corrections, and address the question of feminist spirituality today at the end."

== Reception ==
=== Academic reviews ===
Writing in the Journal of the American Academy of Religion, Mara E. Donaldson of the University of Virginia commented that Adler's book provided an "extensive study of paganism" that "demythologizes" the movement "without being sentimental or self-righteous." Considering it to be a "serious corrective to common misconceptions" propagated in the media, Donaldson stated that it was "worth reading" despite what she herself perceived as "neopaganism's weaknesses", namely the movement's lack of "historical-traditional-cultural memory" and a lack of "sensitivity to the Western problem of evil".

"Drawing Down the Moon is unmatched in its sweeping survey of Neo-Pagan culture and for the historical perspective it provides on the emergence of various small groups within the larger movement. More a report from the trenches than rigorous analysis, Adler's straightforward account of these groups is not an attempt to justify their existence or to explain them away. Her examination of the meanings that individuals make out of their lives through the encounter with and construction of Pagan culture is a welcome shift away from the focus of sociologists on questions of "deviancy" and "conversion" - all concepts defined from outside."

— Sarah M. Pike, American sociologist, 1996.

In a 1996 paper discussing the various sociological studies that had then been made of Paganism, the sociologist Sarah M. Pike noted that Drawing Down the Moon had gone "a long way towards answering the question" as to "what makes these [Pagan ritual] activities valid and viable to those who engage in them". In doing so, Pike believed that Adler's work was an improvement on earlier sociological studies of the movement, namely that of Nachman Ben-Yehuda, which Pike felt had failed to answer this question. Noting Adler's position as a practicing Wiccan, and the impact which this would have on her study, Pike however felt that the book was "less defensive and apologetic than sociological studies conducted by many supposedly objective "outsiders"." Summarizing Drawing Down the Moon as being "unmatched" in its "sweeping survey" of the Pagan movement, Pike notes that in providing an overview of the subject it failed to focus on "detailed examination of specific issues and events."

=== Other reviews ===
Writing for The Women's Review of Books, Robin Herndobler praised Adler's "clear, graceful prose", and the manner in which she had written about Paganism "with interest and compassion."

== Influence ==
=== Pagan community ===
Writing in his later biography of Eddie Buczynski, the Pagan independent scholar Michael G. Lloyd noted that Adler's book was a marked departure from earlier books dealing with Pagan Witchcraft which continued to equate it with either historical early modern witchcraft or Satanism. In her 1999 study of American Wiccans, A Community of Witches, the sociologist Helen A. Berger noted that Drawing Down the Moon had been influential in getting many Wiccans to accept the non-existence of a historical Witch-Cult from which their religion descended. Along with Starhawk's Dreaming the Dark (1982), Adler's book politicized practices of Paganism and witchcraft by emphasizing their radical and feminist aspects, and as a result drew many radical feminists into their orbit.

=== Academia ===
In her sociological study of American Paganism, Loretta Orion, author of Never Again the Burning Times: Paganism Revisited (1995), noted that she had "benefitted" from Adler's study, believing that it contained "insightful reflections" on those whom it was studying.

== Editions ==
- Original edition 1979, hardcover, ISBN 0-670-28342-8 (Viking, New York)
- Original edition 1979, paperback, ISBN 0-8070-3237-9 (Beacon Press, Boston)
- Revised edition 1986, paperback, ISBN 0-8070-3253-0 (Beacon Press, Boston)
- Revised edition 1996, paperback, ISBN 0-14-019536-X (Penguin, New York)
- Revised edition 2006, paperback, ISBN 0-14-303819-2 (Penguin, New York)
