= Helen A. Berger =

American sociologist

- Born: Helen Alice Berger; 1949 (age 76–77)

Academic background
- Education: Brooklyn College, CUNY; University of Sussex; New York University
- Thesis: Witchcraft and the Domination of Women (1983)
- Doctoral advisor: Richard Sennett
- Influences: James A. Beckford; Anthony Giddens

Academic work
- Discipline: Sociology
- Sub-discipline: Sociology of religion
- Institutions: Boston University; West Chester University; Brandeis University
- Main interests: Neopaganism
- Notable works: A Community of Witches (1999)
- Website: helenaliceberger.com

Helen Alice Berger (born 1949) is an American sociologist known for her studies of the Pagan community in the United States.

== Life and career ==
Helen Berger, then an assistant professor at Boston University, first became involved in the study of the Pagan movement in October 1986, when she gave a series of public lectures on the subject of the historical witch trials of New England at the Boston Public Library. She devoted the final lecture to the subject of contemporary Pagan Witches, or Wiccans, who were living in the area, taking her information both from the information published in the works of Margot Adler, Starhawk and Marcello Truzzi, and also from a singular interview that she had carried out with a woman who was "peripherally associated" with Paganism. After the lecture, several audience members approached Berger to identify themselves as practicing Wiccans, and it was through them that she came into contact with the New England Pagan community. Three of the Wiccans at the lecture invited Berger to "participate as a researcher" as they founded their own coven, the Circle of Light, and she would go on to attend their weekly meetings and festival celebrations for the next two years.

At the first open Pagan ritual that she attended, Berger met Andras Corban Arthen, the founder of the EarthSpirit Community (ESC), a Pagan organization open to non-Wiccans which she joined after paying the annual membership fee of $30. Attending many of the ESC's open rituals and festivals, she was introduced to a "diverse group" of Wiccans and other Pagans, developing up a contact base in the community. Berger and Arthen subsequently embarked on a project entitled "The Pagan Census" in an attempt to gain sociological data from the Pagan community across the US. Receiving funding from the Faculty Development Fund at West Chester University, Berger was aided in this project by over 15 students who helped her to code and enter data for the survey. Together, Berger and Arthen wrote and distributed their survey through Wiccan and Pagan organizations across the country, as well as in journals, on the internet and at festivals, with the duo receiving over 2,000 responses, providing Berger with one of her main sources of information.

== Author ==
| Title | Year | Publisher | ISBN |
|---|---|---|---|
| A Community of Witches: Contemporary Neo-Paganism and Witchcraft in the United States | 1999 | University of South Carolina Press | |
| Voices from the Pagan Census: A National Survey of Witches and Neo-Pagans in the United States | 2003 | University of South Carolina Press | |
| Witchcraft and Magic in the New World: North America in the Twentieth Century | 2005 | University of Pennsylvania Press | |
| Teenage Witches: Magical Youth and the Search for the Self | 2007 | Rutgers International Press | |

== Bibliography ==
- Berger, Helen, A. (1999). A Community of Witches: Contemporary Neo-Paganism and Witchcraft in the United States. Columbia, South Carolina: University of South Carolina Press. ISBN 978-1-57003-246-2.
- Berger, Helen A.; Leach, Evan A.; Shaffer, Leigh S. (2003). Voices from the Pagan Census: A National Survey of Witches and Neo-Pagans in the United States. Columbia, South Carolina: University of South Carolina Press. ISBN 978-1-57003-488-6.
- Berger, Helen, A. (ed.) (2005). Witchcraft and Magic in the New World: North America in the Twentieth Century. Philadelphia: University of Pennsylvania Press. ISBN 978-0-8122-3877-8.
- Berger, Helen A.; Ezzy, Douglas (2007). Teenage Witches: Magical Youth and the Search for the Self. New Brunswick, New Jersey and London: Rutgers International Press. ISBN 978-0-8135-4021-4.

== See also ==
- Pagan studies
