= Margot Adler =

American journalist (1946–2014)

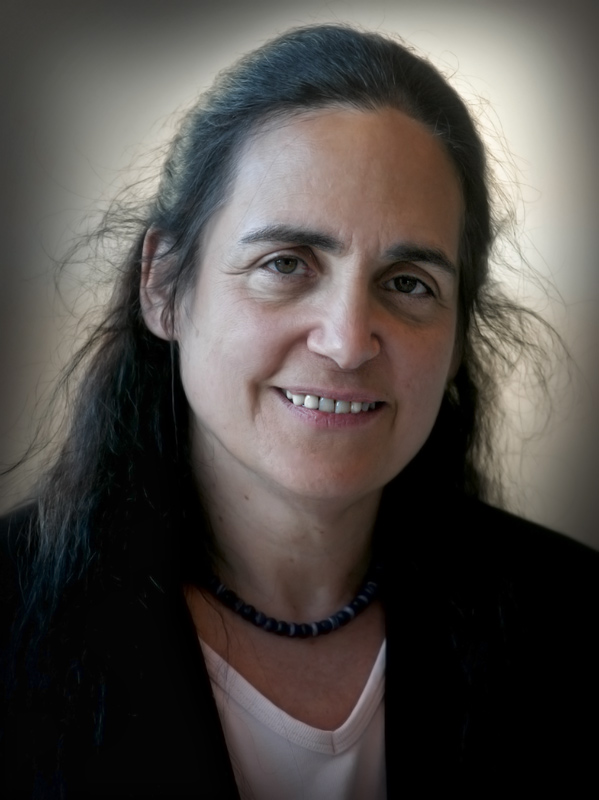
- Margot Adler in 2004
- Born: April 16, 1946; Little Rock, Arkansas, U.S.
- Died: July 28, 2014 (aged 68); New York City, New York, U.S.
- Occupations: Author; journalist; lecturer; Wiccan priestess
- Awards: Lord Ruthven Award (2015)

Margot Susanna Adler (/ˈmɑːrɡoʊ ˈædlər/; April 16, 1946 – July 28, 2014) was an American author, journalist, and lecturer. She worked as a correspondent for National Public Radio for 35 years, became bureau chief of the New York office, and could be heard frequently on nationally syndicated All Things Considered and Morning Edition on National Public Radio (NPR). A Wiccan high priestess, Adler wrote Drawing Down the Moon, a seminal work on neopaganism in America.

== Early life ==
Born in Little Rock, Arkansas, she was the only child of Dr. Kurt Adler, and the only grandchild of renowned psychologist Alfred Adler, a contemporary and associate of Sigmund Freud’s and Carl Jung’s in Vienna before the Second World War. She was also the only child of her mother Freyda Nacque Adler (née Pasternack) who was the daughter of uneducated immigrants, both of whom were dead by the time Margot was born. Freyda was charismatic--Margot likened her to Auntie Mame, beautiful, and a renowned political activist, and beloved mother to Margot. Both parents were Jewish although neither practiced the religion nor observed its religious holidays.

In her autobiographical account of growing up in the 1960s, Heretic's Heart, she branded herself, “an alien in America.” Her paternal grandfather had been a personal friend of Leon Trotsky’s. Trotsky was ruthlessly hunted and ultimately assassinated by Stalin and his henchmen. Her grandfather had brought his family to the United States to avoid persecution by Stalinist, anti-Trotsky factions in Austria. But he was unable to save his oldest daughter, Valentine, who was imprisoned in Russia. Albert Einstein, a friend of the family interceded on the Adlers’ behalf and learned that Valentine and her husband had died in a gulag in 1942.

Margot describes herself as “raised by left-wing parents,” a red diaper baby, in the height of the McCarthy era. Her father, like her grandfather, was a psychiatrist, who remained a cipher to Margot. He devoted his life’s work to analyzing his father’s theories of human psychology and drawing parallels to those of Karl Marx’s theories of economic socialism, although this work remained incomplete at the time of his death. Margot wrote, “The only thing that was beaten in my head was the Adlerian notion of ‘social interest,’ which, while never clearly defined in my youth, seemed to have something to do with being cooperative and merging your individual desires with the needs of society—rather like socialism”.

Margot grew up in Manhattan where she attended the liberal City and Country School in Greenwich Village, “my utopia, and the place that remained whole and intact and vibrant, even when my own family fell apart”. It was here that she fell in love with the stories of the gods and goddesses of myth that were later foundational in her decision to become a Wiccan priestess. There she also discovered her love of singing and performance which would influence her to go to the High School of Music & Art (later joined with the High School of Performing Arts to become the LaGuardia High School of Music & Art and the Performing Arts) in New York City.

It was her mother Freyda to whom she was closest and with whom she lived after her parents’ divorce. Her mother retained the family apartment on Manhattan’s West Side overlooking Central Park, which Margot inherited when it was still a rent-controlled apartment and which she and her husband subsequently purchased when the units became condominiums. Margot referred to the apartment as her bit of heaven on earth, high up on the western edge of Central Park with a view of the city. It came with all of the family mementos stored there since Margot’s childhood, including the letters that formed the basis of Heretic’s Heart.

== Education ==
Adler received a Bachelor of Arts in political science from the University of California, Berkeley and a master's degree from the Columbia University Graduate School of Journalism in New York in 1970. She was a Nieman Fellow at Harvard University in 1982.

The focus of Heretic’s Heart was Margot’s experiences in the 60s. She was a freshman at Berkeley when the Free Speech Movement (FSM) erupted there in 1965 in response to the University of California’s crackdown on student and faculty rights to meet and organize on political issues, specifically to enlist students as workers in the Civil Rights Movement in the South. Campus protests and finally a sit-in at Sproul Hall, the Berkeley Administration Building, resulted in the largest mass arrest of students for political protests in the nation’s history. Following in her mother’s footsteps, Margot did not shy away from political activism. She embraced it, drawn to issues, feeling matters deeply to the point where she willingly went to jail for 90 days for her protests in FSM when she might have escaped her punishment. It was at this time that Margot began working as a volunteer journalist reporting on FSM for Pacifica Radio, KPFA, in Berkeley.

In 1965, the summer of her freshman year, she went to Mississippi to volunteer with the Democratic Freedom Party to register African Americans to vote. This was not a positive experience on many levels. There was discord between the volunteers and regular staff workers; little success in registering many voters; and finally, she found herself stranded with other volunteers on a lonesome country road where they were forced at gunpoint to abandon the one African American volunteer who was with them and who ultimately walked back to safety on his own. The experience left Margot shaken and she decided to return home to New York. She stopped en route in Little Rock, (where she had been born while her father was stationed there during the Second World War) to visit a family friend who lived in an all-white neighborhood and who shared with Margot her regret at the recent school desegregation in that city. This served to further underscore Margot’s sense of alienation in her own country.

At the core of Heretic's Heart is the correspondence between Margot and a GI in Vietnam that took place while she was a student at Berkeley. They wrote 200 pages of letters between the spring of 1967 to later that year when they finally met after he returned in October from a war he didn’t support but had had to fight to survive. He and Margot finally rendezvoused in San Francisco and spent several days together. However, the love affair did not last, and there is no record that they stayed in touch afterward although it came closest to the romantic obsessions spinning in her mind.

After graduating from Berkeley Phi Beta Kappa with a degree in political science, she chose to pursue a career in journalism and was accepted into the Master’s Program at Columbia University. But being part of the establishment did not end her political activism. She and a friend, as part of their studies, joined the Venceremos Brigade harvesting sugar in Cuba to support the Cuban revolution and to counter the crippling impact of the USA's economic embargo against the country. Her stay ended when she was called back to her mother’s bedside, who was dying from lung cancer. She died in 1970 at the age of 61.

== Journalism and radio ==
In 1971 Margot went to Washington, D.C. during the Nixon years to serve as bureau chief for Pacifica radio. These were difficult times for her. She struggled with her weight and body issues and felt “I was way over my head in the strange land of Richard Nixon’s Washington. On the outside I tried to look reasonably ‘straight’ and presentable; I spoke softly and politely. On the inside I was raging.”

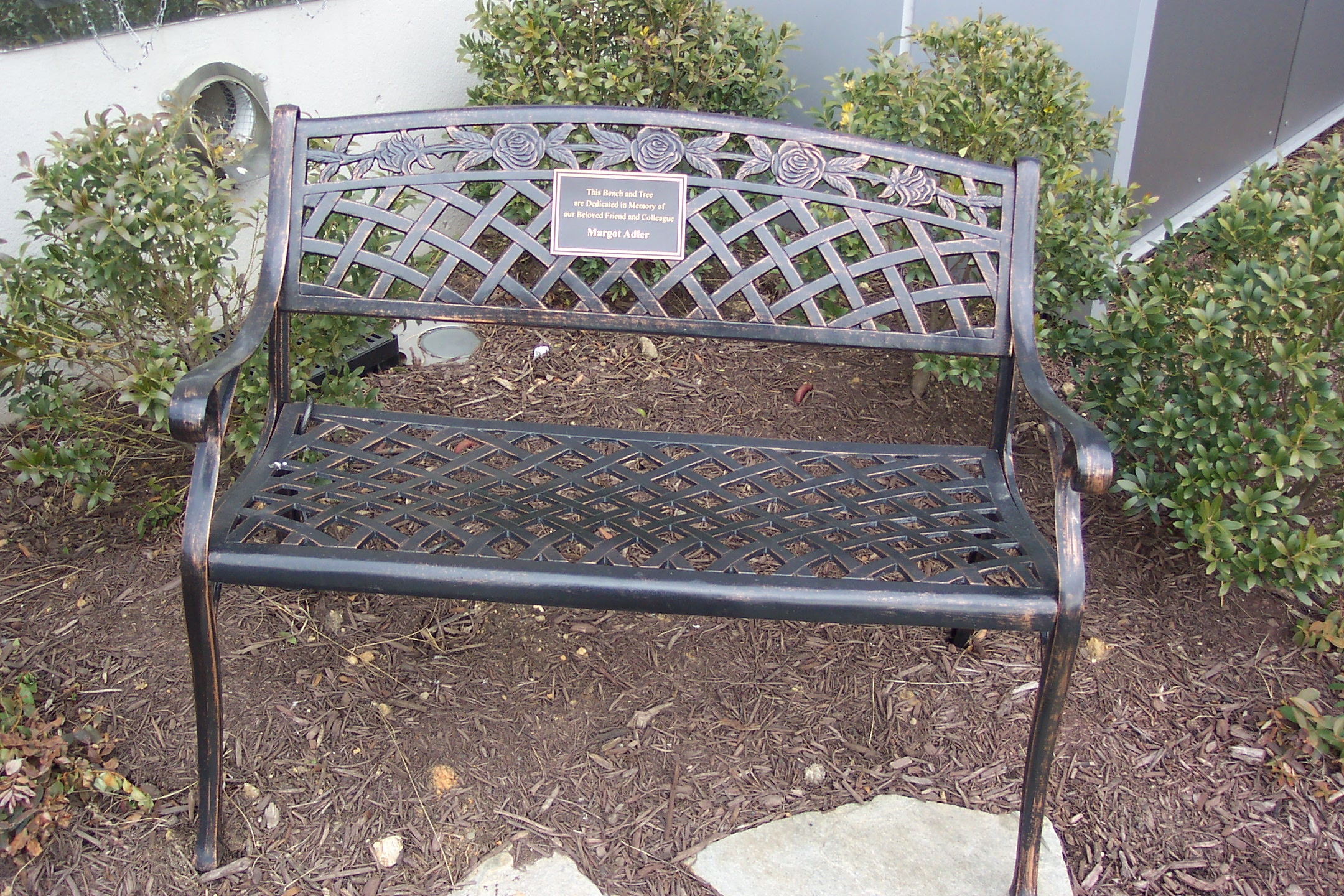
At the headquarters of NPR in Washington, DC, Margot Adler is honored with a memorial bench.

After returning to New York City, she worked at its sister station, WBAI-FM, where, in 1972, she created the talk show Hour of the Wolf (still on the air as hosted by Jim Freund), and later another talk show, called Unstuck in Time.

Adler joined NPR in 1979 as a general assignment reporter, after spending a year as an NPR freelance reporter covering New York City, and subsequently worked on a great many pieces dealing with subjects as diverse as the death penalty, the right to die movement, the response to the war in Kosovo, computer gaming, the drug ecstasy, geek culture, children and technology and Pokémon. After 9/11, she focused much of her work on stories exploring the human factors in New York City, from the loss of loved ones, homes and jobs, to work in the relief effort. She was the host of Justice Talking up until the show ceased production on July 3, 2008. She was a regular voice on Morning Edition and All Things Considered. She was also co-producer of an award-winning radio drama, War Day.

== Neopaganism ==
Adler wrote Drawing Down the Moon, a 1979 book about Neopaganism which was revised in 2006. The book is considered by some a watershed in American Neopagan circles, as it provided the first comprehensive look at modern nature-based religions in the US. For many years it was the only introductory work about American Neopagan communities. She was also drawn to paganism as the spiritual side of her feminism which rejected the hierarchy of monotheism. She agreed with the historian James Breasted's characterization of monotheism as “imperialism in religion.”

Her second book, Heretic's Heart: A Journey Through Spirit and Revolution, was published by Beacon Press in 1997. Adler was a Wiccan priestess, an elder in the Covenant of the Goddess, and she also participated in the Unitarian Universalist faith community.

== Personal life ==
Margot’s partner in life was John Gliedman whom she married in June 1988 when she was 42. Like Margot, he was the child of a psychiatrist, well-educated with a doctorate from the Massachusetts Institute of Technology. They held a commitment ceremony in 1976. They were married in a pagan ritual that took place on Martha’s Vineyard where Margot had loved family vacations with her parents as a child. “Their wedding was the first Pagan handfasting to be written up in the society pages of The New York Times.” Margot and John had one child, a son born in 1990.

== Death ==
In early 2011, Adler was diagnosed with endometrial cancer, which metastasized over the following three years. Adler died on July 28, 2014, at the age of 68.

== Bibliography ==
- 1979 – Drawing Down the Moon: Witches, Druids, Goddess-Worshippers, and Other Pagans in America Today ISBN 0-14-019536-X
- 1997 – Heretic's Heart: A Journey Through Spirit and Revolution (Beacon Press)ISBN 0-8070-7098-X
- 2000 – Our Way to the Stars by Margot Adler & John Gliedman – Motorbooks Intl ISBN 0-7603-0753-9, ISBN 978-0-7603-0753-3
- 2013 – Out for Blood Kindle Single
- 2014 – Vampires Are Us (Weiser Books) ISBN 1-5786-3560-8, ISBN 978-1-5786-3560-3

=== Contributed to ===
- 1989 – Healing the Wounds: The Promise of Ecofeminism – Judith Plant (editor) (New Society Pub) ISBN 0-86571-152-6
- 1994 – Return of the Great Goddess by Burleigh Muten (Shambhala) ISBN 1-57062-034-2
- 1995 – People of the Earth: The New Pagans Speak Out by Ellen Evert Hopman, Lawrence Bond (Inner Traditions) ISBN 0-89281-559-0
- 2001 – Modern Pagans: an Investigation of Contemporary Ritual (Re/Search) ISBN 1-889307-10-6
- 2002 – The Free Speech Movement: Reflections on Berkeley in the 1960s – Edited by Robert Cohen and Reginald E. Zelnik (University of California Press) ISBN 978-0-520-23354-6
- 2003 – Sisterhood Is Forever: The Women's Anthology for a New Millennium (Adler wrote "Inner Space: The Spiritual Frontier") – edited by Robin Morgan (Washington Square Press) ISBN 0-7434-6627-6
- 2005 – Cakes and Ale for the Pagan Soul: Spells, Recipes, and Reflections from Neopagan Elders and Teachers – Patricia Telesco (Celestial Arts) ISBN 978-1-58091-164-1

== Discography ==
- 1986 – From Witch to Witch-Doctor: Healers, Therapists and Shamans ACE – Lecture on cassette
- 1986 – The Magickal Movement: Present and Future (with Isaac Bonewits, Selena Fox, and Robert Anton Wilson) ACE – Panel discussion on cassette

== See also ==
- Maggie Shayne
- Murry Hope
