= Magic, Witchcraft and the Otherworld =

Book by Susan Greenwood

Magic, Witchcraft and the Otherworld: An Anthropology
- The first edition cover of the book
- Author: Susan Greenwood
- Language: English
- Subjects: Anthropology of religion Pagan studies
- Publisher: Berg Publishers
- Publication date: 2000
- Publication place: United Kingdom
- Media type: Print (hardcover & paperback)
- Pages: 235
- ISBN: 978-1-85973-445-2

Magic, Witchcraft and the Otherworld: An Anthropology is an anthropological study of contemporary Pagan and ceremonial magic groups that practiced magic in London, England, during the 1990s. It was written by English anthropologist Susan Greenwood based upon her doctoral research undertaken at Goldsmiths' College, a part of the University of London, and first published in 2000 by Berg Publishers.

Greenwood became involved in the esoteric movement during the 1980s as a practitioner of a feminist form of Wicca. Devoting her doctorate to the subject, her research led her to join Kabbalistic orders and two Wiccan covens, during which she emphasised that she was both an "insider" (a practising occultist) and an "outsider" (an anthropological observer). Reacting against the work of Tanya Luhrmann, who had authored the primary anthropological study of the London occult scene, Persuasions of the Witch's Craft (1989), Greenwood argued against studying magical beliefs from a western rationalist perspective, instead adopting a theoretical approach informed by phenomenology and relativism. Greenwood's research focused on Pagan and magical conceptions of the "otherworld". The book's first chapter summarises the Pagan magical conception of the otherworld, and subsequent chapters detail Greenwood's experiences with Kabbalistic magic and Wicca. The work goes on to discuss issues of psychotherapy and healing, gender and sexuality, and morality and ethics within London's esoteric community, and the manner in which the community's members' views on these issues are influenced by their beliefs regarding an otherworld.

Magic, Witchcraft and the Otherworld was reviewed by various figures involved in both academia and the Pagan community including Douglas Ezzy and Phil Hine. Greenwood herself would go on to author several other books on the relationship between magic and anthropology.

== Background ==
=== Anthropological fieldwork into Paganism ===
Prior to Greenwood's work, several academic researchers working in the field of Pagan studies had published investigations of the Pagan community in the United States and the United Kingdom. First among these was the practicing Wiccan, journalist and political activist Margot Adler in her Drawing Down the Moon: Witches, Druids, Goddess-Worshippers, and Other Pagans in America Today, published by Viking Press in 1979. A second study was produced by anthropologist Tanya M. Luhrmann in Persuasions of the Witch's Craft: Ritual Magic in Contemporary England (1989), in which she focused on a Wiccan coven and several ceremonial magic orders based in London. Sociologist Allen Scarboro, psychologist Nancy Campbell and Wiccan literary critic Shirley Stave undertook fieldwork in the Ravenwood coven of Atlanta, Georgia, over several months across 1990 and 1991 as the basis for Living Witchcraft: A Contemporary American Coven, published by Praeger in 1994, while anthropologist and Wiccan Loretta Orion investigated the Pagan movement in the East Coast and Midwest of the U.S. for Never Again the Burning Times: Paganism Revisited, published by Waveland Press in 1995. 1997 saw the publication of Witchcraft and Paganism in Australia, authored by anthropologist Lynne Hume.

=== Greenwood and her research ===
"This is a study of certain ideas, philosophies, practices and groups within the Western esoteric tradition in the last decade of the twentieth century. I explore, through issues concerning magical identity, gender, and morality, aspects of what magicians term the 'otherworld'."

— Susan Greenwood, 2000.

As a child, Greenwood had found a greater spiritual connection with the natural world than with organised religion. During the late 1970s, she embraced second-wave feminism and came across feminist forms of Pagan Witchcraft through Starhawk's Dreaming the Dark (1982). Attracted to this new religious movement, she undertook an undergraduate degree in anthropology and sociology at Goldsmiths' College, where her final year research project focused on women's spirituality. Exploring the topic in further depth, she devoted a PhD to the subject, thereby conducting the research underpinning Magic, Witchcraft and the Otherworld.

Although initially planning to gather data through formal taped interviews with participants, she rejected this method, believing it solidified her "outsider" status among the subculture she was studying. Instead, her data was collected through informal conversations with practitioners, during which she tried to make clear that she was an anthropologist and would use their comments in her work. Over the course of her research, Greenwood gained many friends within the city's Pagan community, and became sexually and emotionally attached to one magician. Greenwood's research was funded using grants from the University of London Central Research Fund and from the Economic and Social Research Council. She devoted the published work to her children, Adrian and Lauren.

== Synopsis ==
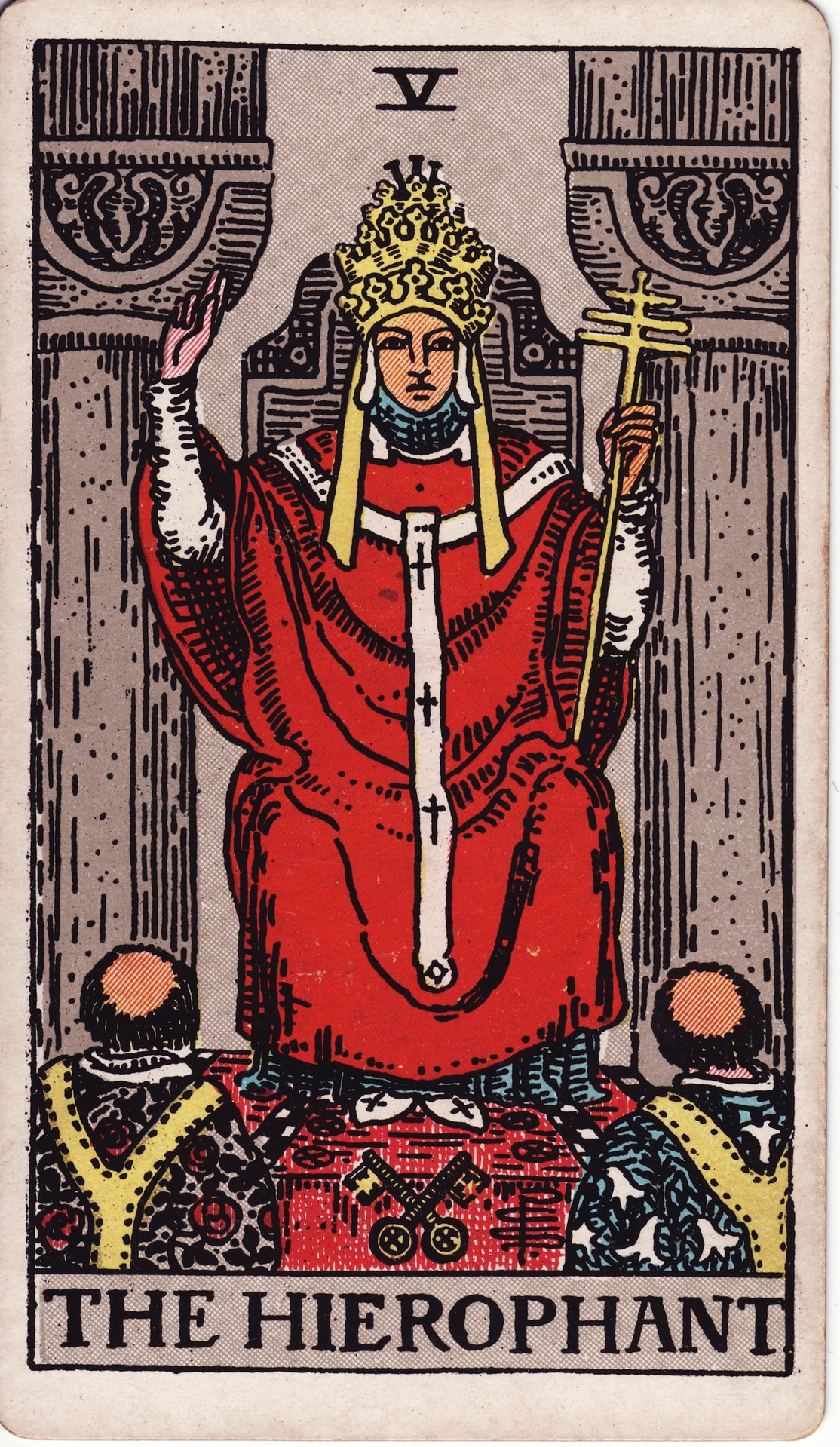
Greenwood includes in her work an image of Tarot card "The Hierophant", which she was taught to meditate on while working with Qabalistic magic.

Chapter one describes contemporary Paganism and defines "the otherworld". It discusses London's magical and Pagan subculture in the 1990s, and Greenwood's relationship with it. Admitting to being an "insider", she explores her mixed feelings at being both a practicing Pagan and an anthropological observer. The second chapter examines the community's conceptions of the otherworld, explaining how they approach it through acts of visualisation and altered states of consciousness and their understandings of it as a realm of spiritual energy connected to dreams and the imagination. Discussing the relationship between anthropology and magic, Greenwood argues that it is impossible for anthropologists to truly understand beliefs regarding magic and the otherworld if they only view it through a western rationalist lens, instead arguing for a phenomenological or relativist perspective that accepts alternative views of the world.

In her third chapter, Greenwood examines her experiences among London's ceremonial magicians, focusing on her training in the Hermetic Qabalah, a "magical language" for exploring the otherworld. Adopting Luhrmann's concept of "interpretative drift", she relates how she shifted her understanding of events to make sense of her magical experiences. However, in contrast to Luhrmann's emphasis on how practitioners overcame their initial scepticism, Greenwood focuses on how these practitioners learn "the language of another mode of reality" through their experiences. Chapter four details Greenwood's early involvement in Wicca, through three separate covens. Offering her thoughts on Wiccan invocations, she then discusses the faith's approach to sexual polarity, pointing to the sexual underpinnings of the Great Rite and the Gnostic Mass as evidence. The chapter is rounded off with an explanation of how Wicca understands the natural world and a comparison between the religion and ceremonial magic.

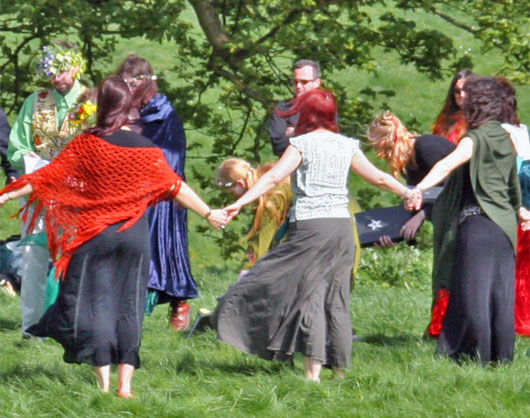
Greenwood's work is based upon her fieldwork within the practicing Pagan community.

Chapter five examines the attraction of magic for its practitioners, and its uses for psychotherapy and healing. Greenwood explores the ways in which occultists use magic as a rebellion against Christianity, and their construction of a "magical identity", believing this to be "organized around a deep internal exploration of the self through an interaction with the otherworld". She also looks at magic and the acquisition of power, and the sense of empowerment discovered by magicians who were former abuse victims. The sixth chapter focuses on notions of gender and sexuality, highlighting the widespread belief that sexual energy provides the power behind magic and discussing the contrasting views of Dion Fortune and Aleister Crowley on this issue; the former emphasised harmony and balance between "masculine" and "feminine" magical forces, while the latter advocated "magical anarchy" or spiritual autonomy for each individual, irrespective of gender. Greenwood looks at contrasting views on these issues in High Magic (ceremonial magic), Wicca and Feminist Witchcraft. Drawing upon the typologies advocated by sociologist of religion Susan J. Palmer, she argues that High Magic emphasises "sex polarity", a situation in which men and women are seen as unequal and different, whereas Wicca holds to a position of "sex complementarity", in which men and women are seen as different yet equal, and Feminist Witchcraft advocates "sex unity", in which there is a tolerance of sexual ambiguity.

Chapter seven deals with conceptions of morality and ethics, arguing that whereas High Magic typically envisions a dualistic world view of good versus evil, Wicca adheres to a monistic worldview in which malevolence and benevolence are seen as intrinsic parts of the whole. Disagreeing with Luhrmann's view that morality's place in the occult is to hide the pseudo-scientific nature of magic, Greenwood discusses how magic and witchcraft developed in Europe as a part of moral discourse. She looks at the internal source of morality in High Magic, explaining concepts such as that of the qlippoth, before examining the internal source of morality in Wicca and Feminist Witchcraft.

== Central arguments ==
Greenwood states that western esotericists have a holistic, animistic view of cosmology, considering the universe to be alive and interconnected with spiritual energies. According to such beliefs, many of these energies operate in "a time and space distinct from, but also very closely connected to, everyday reality", and it is this area that is termed the "otherworld" in Pagan discourse. She relates that western esotericists believe in forces who inhabit this otherworld, and who are personalized as deities, animal guides, or spirit beings. She furthermore states that these individuals see themselves as microcosms of the universal macrocosm.

Greenwood highlights the practitioners' belief that they can interact with this otherworld and the entities which inhabit it through rituals that facilitate their own altered states of consciousness. She notes that western magicians make use of mythology as a form of "cognitive map" to "structure their otherworldy experience". She also notes that this otherworld is closely linked to dreams and the imagination in western magical belief.

Greenwood argues that the academic discipline of anthropology, being a product of the western rationalism developed during the Age of Enlightenment, is innately skeptical of claims for the existence of magic or an otherworld, either among non-western cultures or western subcultures. In contrast to this attitude, she notes that anthropology is the discipline which first pointed out that "reality is culturally constructed" and that there are "multiple ways of experiencing the world", including those which conceive of an otherworld existing alongside our own reality. For this reason, she argues that anthropologists wishing to understand a society that believes in and practices magic must first tentatively accept the existence of an otherworld, claiming that "it is inappropriate to use methods developed for the study of everyday reality to analyse the magical otherworld."

== Reception and recognition ==
=== Academic ===
Greenwood's text was reviewed by Patric V. Giesler of Gustavus Adolphus College for peer-reviewed academic journal American Ethnologist. Giesler describes Greenwood's work as "provocative", noting that it represents a "native's account" of Paganism, with Greenwood being "a native gone anthropologist." He characterises Greenwood's experiences as religious or spiritual rather than magical, because none of the practices that she described involved manipulating beings or forces for an instrumental end; the classic definition of magic. Unconvinced by her argument that practitioner's notions of identity, gender and morality derived from their encounter with the otherworld, he considers other sources for such notions, but otherwise recommended the book.

The book was also reviewed by religious studies scholar Michael York of Bath Spa University for the Journal for the Scientific Study of Religion. Labelling it an "enormously engaging, provocative, and rich book", he notes that readers may wish that Greenwood had more explicitly presented "the antipatriarchal assumptions and their shortcomings" of Feminist Witchcraft. Comparing it with Luhrmann's Persuasions of the Witch's Craft, York comments that it is a "discerningly astute, nonretreating, thoroughly enjoyable, and highly recommended work."

Sarah M. Pike of the California State University, Chico reviewed the book for Culture and Religion: An Interdisciplinary Journal, describing it as an "accessible and personal account". Believing that it made an "important contribution" to Pagan studies and the anthropological study of magic, she nevertheless thought that Greenwood's subjective attitude was the book's shortcoming as well as its strength. Pike finds problems in Greenwood's insider-outsider status, believing that it has not been sufficiently theorised, and that Greenwood was unaware of her own bias in favour of Feminist Witchcraft, which in turn affects her interpretation of other forms of Wicca and ceremonial magic. She also critiques the book's lack of commentary or detailed analysis, complaining that many subsections lack conclusions.

Anthropologist Galina Lindquist of the Stockholm University published a review in The Australian Journal of Anthropology, referring to Magic, Witchcraft and the Otherworld as "a welcome contribution" containing "valuable" ethnographic material. Noting that it joins the work of anthropologists like Jeanne Favret-Saada, Paul Stoller, and E. Turner, Lindquist praises the manner in which Greenwood put contemporary practices into historical perspective, and how she illuminates the "strains and contradictions" within the magical milieu. She believes that Greenwood's arguments would have been strengthened had she made use of a more in-depth ethnographic study of magical morality, and considers it unfortunate that Greenwood had not touched on ritual studies.

=== Pagan and esoteric community ===
"This is one of the most stimulating and rewarding ethnographies of contemporary Witchcraft I've read. Greenwood has worked hard, and it shows in the quality of her findings and analysis. Her writing is clear, insightful, and draws on a sophisticated theoretical framework. She describes herself as a communicator between the worlds of academia and magical counterculture. She is clearly widely read both in the academic literature and the magical texts, more than competent in both worlds, and skilled at revealing one to the other."

— Reviewer Douglas Ezzy, 2001.

Greenwood's work was independently reviewed by two separate individuals in The Pomegranate: A New Journal of Neopagan Thought – then a scholarly but not yet academic publication. The first reviewer, Daniel Cohen of Wood and Water magazine, praises Greenwood's theoretical approach, claiming that she had been "braver" than Luhrmann in maintaining a "creative tension" as both an insider and outsider. Asserting that Greenwood's use of anthropological terminology made for "hard reading", he suspects that her use of the word "magician" would jar with many Pagans who would disagree with the manner in which she used it. In conclusion, he recommends it as a "valuable but inexpensive book".

The Pomegranate's second review came from Pagan studies scholar Douglas Ezzy of the University of Tasmania, who praises Greenwood's research, theoretical approach and style of writing. He notes that her "truly ground breaking" approach in taking spiritual experiences seriously had "fascinated and thrilled" him, asserting that her work builds on the pioneering edited collection Being Changed by Jean-Guy Goulet and David E. Young. Noting that Magic, Witchcraft and the Otherworld was "sometimes provocative", he disagrees with some of Greenwood's conclusions, but highlights that her arguments had made him think about these issues "in much sharper focus."

Reviewing it for his own website, prominent chaos magician Phil Hine described Greenwood's work as "fascinating", arguing that it should interest students of anthropology as well as practising occultists. He praises the author's descriptions of her own experiences within esoteric groups, and the manner in which she highlighted the power struggles that take place within them, before recommending it as "an engaging and thought-provoking read".
