= Gareth Knight =

British occultist, ritual magician, author, and publisher

- Born: Basil Leslie Wilby; 3 April 1930; Colchester, Essex, United Kingdom
- Died: 1 March 2022 (aged 91); Braintree, Essex, United Kingdom
- Organizations: Society of the Inner Light; Gareth Knight Group
- Spouse: Roma Wilby (1959–2019)
- Children: 2

Basil Leslie Wilby (3 April 1930 – 1 March 2022), known as Gareth Knight, was a British occultist, ritual magician, author, and publisher. Born in Colchester, Essex, Knight developed an interest in magic in early life. He read the works of the occultist Dion Fortune when he was 23, leading him to seek initiation into her Society of the Inner Light, and was admitted as an initiate in 1954. Knight was an active participant in the Society for the next decade, serving as its librarian and the editor of its periodical New Dimensions. In the early 1960s, he and his wife Roma co-founded the Helios Book Service with fellow Society members John and Mary Hall, aiming to publish occult-related books and distribute them by mail order.

Knight left the Society in 1965, feeling alienated by its increasingly religious direction. He published his first four books in the second half of the decade. Knight befriended the esoteric Anglican priest Anthony Duncan and developed an interest in Christian occultism; his works from the 1970s onwards interpreted magic and spiritual practice through an explicitly Christian lens. In 1973, he founded his own esoteric order known as the Gareth Knight Group. The group was known for its annual conventions at Greystone, a manor house in Wiltshire, where Knight hosted lectures and rituals for an occultist audience; it was a focus of Persuasions of the Witch's Craft, an anthropological study of contemporary magical practice by Tanya Luhrmann.

Throughout his life, Knight published on a variety of occult subjects. His areas of interest included Christian esotericism, tarot reading, Arthurian legends, Celtic mythology, and occult influence on J. R. R. Tolkien's works. Knight rejoined the Society of the Inner Light in 1998 and became Fortune's biographer, as well as compiling collections of many of her previously unpublished works. He died on 1 March 2022 at the age of 91.

== Early life and occult beginnings ==
Basil Leslie Wilby was born 3 April 1930 (Note: Some sources report his date of birth as 21 March.) in Colchester, Essex. His parents were clerks for the General Post Office. Wilby attended the Colchester Royal Grammar School and reportedly first developed an interest in magic as a child. He pursued the sciences at school, and his first job after graduation was as a laboratory technician at a plastics factory. As a young man, he attempted to pursue a profession as a jazz musician, which led him to join the Royal Air Force at the age of eighteen as part of its ground crew. He felt the financial security provided by the position would allow him to establish a music career; according to his autobiography, he came to regret the decision and the eight-year commitment it required. During his service, Wilby developed a vocal interest in left-wing politics, which led his supervisors to reassign him to No. 2 Radio School, Yatesbury out of concerns he would be a security risk in an active service station.

At age 23, after reading Dion Fortune's books, Wilby sought initiation into her Society of the Inner Light. He was introduced to her works by a fellow instructor at No. 2 Radio School and developed an immediate interest in the concept of esoteric orders. Wilby was ultimately admitted as an initiate on 23 October 1954. In 1956, while working his way through the Lesser Mysteries, Knight finished his term with the RAF and enrolled at a teacher's college. This allowed him to attend Society meetings more easily, as the commute from the college was more convenient than from his prior employment. While travelling back from one meeting, Wilby had a vision of a "red jewel" in the sky, as if upon "the headdress of a great goddess". He learned this was an astronomical event known as an appulse, and was told by other members of the Society it represented him making contact with the spirit of Fortune. As Wilby's studies in teaching continued, he felt increasingly dissatisfied with the path and desired to instead become a poet, which led to him dropping out of the program.

Wilby was initiated into the Greater Mysteries in 1959. Around this time, he became the Society's librarian and married his wife Roma. He began work as a writer in 1961 when he was contacted by Carl L. Weschcke. Weschcke had recently purchased Llewellyn Publications, a publisher of mind, body, and spirit literature, and sought republication rights for Fortune's back catalogue. Wilby was commissioned to write introductions to the books. For this role, he adopted the pseudonym Gareth Knight. This would become the name under which he was best known, although he originally adopted it to mask his occult practices in hopes of becoming a successful playwright under his real name.

In the early 1960s, Knight and the Society started publishing the periodical New Dimensions. (Note: Knight's entry in the Encyclopedia of Occultism and Parapsychology states that New Dimensions was founded in 1962; Knight's autobiography I Called it Magic places the start date at 1963.) He wrote for the magazine as both Wilby and Knight, writing editorials under the former name and tarot-related articles under the latter. Knight aimed to feature a range of writers each issue; as the magazine's profile grew, it drew attention and submissions from major occultists of the day, including Gerald Gardner, Israel Regardie, W. E. Butler, and Patricia Crowther. New Dimensions was intended by Llewellyn to raise the profile of the books they published, and to this end the magazine included book reviews and what Knight called "extensive" advertisements. The essays published in New Dimensions ranged greatly in subject matter, addressing subjects such as ufology, astral projection, psychedelics, and psychic powers. Knight wished for New Dimensions to be sold in both mainstream and occult bookshops, but it was rejected by the former and treated with derision by the latter.

Around the same time, Knight and Roma co-founded the Helios Book Service with fellow Society members John and Mary Hall. Helios aimed to publish occult-related books and distribute them by mail order. Its early endeavours focused on books previously in the Society's library. A decision to downsize the library led to many more openly occult-related books, as well as works of speculative fiction, being removed. Knight wished to preserve the books, and asked the Society's permission to sell them by mail order. The operation was profitable, leading the Halls to take it over with aims to make it a fully-featured publishing house.

== Separation from the Society; writing and publishing ==
Knight and Roma moved from London to Tewkesbury in 1964. Their first child, a son named Richard, was born shortly after the move. Knight and Butler began to collaborate on producing a correspondence course in ritual magic, which they wrote under the Helios imprint. Both men felt increasingly disaffected with the Society; Knight was increasingly alienated by the group's increasing emphasis on the Christian aspect of Fortune's teachings, which had "burst into the group" at the beginning of the 1960s, and tendered his resignation in 1965. In his personal life, Knight's increasingly limited finances led him to seek more conventional employment. He began working as a travelling bookseller in the West Country and soon after became part of the promotion team at Pergamon Press, a scientific publishing house.

Knight published his first book, A Practical Guide to Qabalistic Symbolism, through Helios in 1965. He would publish three more works in the late 1960s: The New Dimensions Red Book (1968), a compilation of essays on Western esotericism, and two introductory guides, The Practice of Ritual Magic (1969) and Occult Exercises and Practices (1969). In 1970, Knight and his growing family left Tewkesbury for Harlow after his employer, the publishing company Longman, relocated him to a stationary role. His daughter Rebecca was born that same year.

In the early 1970s, Knight and Butler separated professionally. The Helios Course remained with Butler and evolved into its own occult society known as the Servants of the Light, which was co-administered with Dolores Ashcroft-Nowicki. Around this time, Knight's spirituality was increasingly influenced by Anthony Duncan, an Anglican priest with esoteric inclinations. The two had met during Knight's years in Tewkesbury; Knight had noticed an increasing Christian influence in the Society around the time he left it, and sought out a priest with heterodox views to understand how Christianity and occultism could be compatible. He was intrigued by Duncan's views, becoming formally confirmed in the Church of England and publishing Duncan's The Christ, Psychotherapy, and Magic through Helios in 1969.

Through Duncan's influence, Knight's work came to focus on a syncretic Christian occultism, espoused in his next book Experience of the Inner Worlds (1975). In A History of the Occult Tarot, the scholars Ronald Decker and Michael Dummett contrasted the presentations of Christianity in A Practical Guide to Qabalistic Symbolism and Experience of the Inner Worlds. While the former makes similar use of Christian symbolism to Fortune's own work, with Jesus understood as a particularly skilled esoteric teacher rather than the Son of God, the latter is "resolutely Christian".

== Gareth Knight Group and further writing ==
Reality, [Knight] says, does not lie behind the appearances. It is the appearances – imaginative or otherwise – themselves.

— Tanya Luhrmann, Persuasions of the Witch's Craft

In 1973, Knight founded an esoteric magic order generally known as the Gareth Knight Group. The group was small in size, which Knight ascribed in part to its lengthy initiation period; talking to the anthropologist Tanya Luhrmann, he estimated 70% of potential initiates dropped out within the first year of the five-year course. Though it possessed the secrecy common to occult groups, the Gareth Knight Group was distinguished from other esoteric orders of the 1970s and 1980s by its open events. Knight held annual conventions at Greystone, a manor house in Wiltshire, every May that became popular amongst a broad spectrum of English occultists. The Greystone events, which lasted a weekend, were structured around a series of lectures and ended with a group ritual. They attracted prominent figures in the community, including Dolores Ashcroft-Nowicki, Robert John Stewart, and John and Caitlin Matthews.

Greystone became an important locus of the era's occult and pagan subcultures. Luhrmann's Persuasions of the Witch's Craft, an anthropological study of such groups, included Knight, Greystone, and the Gareth Knight Group amongst its most prominent elements. She characterizes Knight in this period as a man of "lofty goals" who sought to "revitalize England [and] unite Christian and pagan spiritual currents" through his practice. Knight kept watch for prominent coincidences after his rituals. During one Greystone event, he hosted a ritual where participants used mirrors to reflect a power and learned shortly after that recent protests had used a similar theme; when giving a talk about this, one participant was surprised to hear he was unfamiliar with the protests and had assumed he lifted the idea from them. Knight espoused a subjective idealist philosophy, attacking the concept that mind and matter were clearly differentiable, and argued that "the magician lives in a different reality from that of the engineer, and his 'truth' is bound to differ".

The nature of Knight's practices drew some discontent. One Greystone participant was skeptical about attending due to Knight's Christianity. Others, particularly neopagan witches from a feminist background, were repulsed by it; two attendees at the 1984 Greystone ritual said they lost all interest after he introduced Christian symbolism. As well as Christianity, Knight during this period was strongly influenced by the King Arthur mythos. Around 1979 he wrote the Catechism of the Grail, a pamphlet on Arthurian mythology, and he incorporated significant Arthurian symbolism in Greystone rituals. He also developed an interest in Rosicrucianism, a 17th-century religious movement oriented around alchemy. Knight published several books on these subjects throughout the 1970s and 1980s, including The Occult: An Introduction (1975), A History of White Magic (1979), The Secret Tradition in Arthurian Legend (1983), The Rose Cross and the Goddess (1985), and The Treasure House of Images (1986).

The Gareth Knight Tarot, which Knight had designed in the early 1960s, was released in 1984 after the tarot card collector Stuart Kaplan contacted Knight and offered to fund its publication. Though Knight permitted its publication and was positively inclined to the increasing popularity of tarot from the 1970s onwards, he regarded the set bearing his name as a work of juvenilia and no longer considered its symbolism representative of his work by that point. The set used conventional Rider–Waite Tarot-inspired art, while Knight by the 1980s was more inclined to Celtic and Arthurian iconography. Knight began teaching a correspondence course on tarot reading in 1987 and published two books on tarot in five years, The Treasure House of Images and The Magical World of the Tarot (1991). Decker and Dummett describe the tarot-reading philosophy of these works as "relaxed", with an eclectic reading of the cards and a willingness to draw imagery from disparate places. Knight throughout the books presents the history of tarot straightforwardly; he discusses its use as a card game for centuries prior to the cards being ascribed any spiritual significance, rather than hiding this history as some occult authors did.

Knight based the 1986 Greystone ritual on the works of J. R. R. Tolkien, inspired by both a C. S. Lewis-inspired ritual the previous year and the way the mythological worldbuilding of Tolkien's works coexisted with his Christianity. Following the ritual, Knight's friend John Matthews encouraged him to write a book on esotericism in Tolkien's work. The confluence of Tolkien and Lewis led Knight to write on The Inklings, a literary group that included both men along with Charles Williams and Owen Barfield. The resulting book, The Magical World of the Inklings, was published in 1990.

The Magical World of the Inklings rapidly received attention. Barfield, the last surviving member of the Inklings, reviewed it upon release and praised it as "more than outstanding ... not in the same league with anything else [he had] come across". Reviews for the book in Tolkien scholarship were mixed, focusing on its occult lens. Reviewing in Mythlore, David Llewellyn Dodds felt Knight considered magic and mythopoeia the same concept and argued that this was a form of "appropriation". Matthew T. Dickerson, writing for Sehnsucht: The C.S. Lewis Journal, found Knight "convincing" regarding Williams and Barfield but was more skeptical about the book's applicability to Tolkien and Lewis. Though he found the book "make[s] some interesting points", he believed Knight was working backwards from the thesis that the Inklings were inspired by the esoteric, rather than exploring the subject without bias. Joshua Luke Roberts appraised The Magical World of the Inklings positively in the Journal of Inklings Studies, describing it as a "profound and provocative philosophical" work and something to "savour and reference".

The Gareth Knight Group evolved over the course of the 1990s; a splinter group called Magical Christianity emerged in the United States. Knight regained contact with the Society of the Inner Light in 1991, when he accepted their offer to edit a collection of Fortune's letters from the First World War. Later that decade, he published his first book on Fortune, An Introduction to Ritual Magic (1997). An essay collection, it consisted of a mix of Fortune's unpublished pieces and his own additions. Knight rejoined the Society in 1998, passing control of the Gareth Knight Group to successors he had personally selected; it renamed itself the Avalon Group upon his departure.

== Later life, death, and legacy ==
Following his return to the Society, Knight came to write more actively about Fortune. He published a number of collections of her work, most of which included forewords or additions by him. He became her biographer, publishing Dion Fortune and the Inner Light in 2000, and has been characterized as an apologist for her work. In the 2000s, Knight began to write about fairies within Celtic mythology, inspired by an analysis of Chrétien de Troyes's Arthurian works. Knight became part of the burgeoning internet occult culture of the late 1990s and early 2000s, hosting a site dedicated to his works on Angelfire.

Knight died at his home in Braintree, Essex, on 1 March 2022 at the age of 91. He survived his wife Roma, who died in December 2019. A group including his daughter Rebecca "Rebsie" Fairholm organized the first annual Gareth Knight Conference on 26 March, focused around his work and impact on esotericism. The second Gareth Knight Conference, held in 2023, celebrated the 50th anniversary of the Gareth Knight Group's founding.
