= Dion Fortune =

British occultist and writer (1890–1946)

- Fortune as a teenager; the image dates from approximately 1905
- Born: Violet Mary Firth; 6 December 1890; Llandudno, Caernarfonshire, Wales
- Died: 6 or 8 January 1946 (aged 55); Middlesex Hospital, London, England
- Occupations: Occultist, author

Dion Fortune (born Violet Mary Firth, 6 December 1890 – 6 or 8 January 1946) was a British occultist, ceremonial magician, and writer. She was a co-founder of the Fraternity of the Inner Light, an occult organisation that promoted philosophies which she claimed had been taught to her by spiritual entities known as the Ascended Masters. A prolific writer, she produced a large number of articles and books on her occult ideas and also authored seven novels, several of which expound occult themes.

Fortune was born in Llandudno, Caernarfonshire, North Wales, to a wealthy upper middle-class English family, although little is known of her early life. By her teenage years she was living in England's West Country, where she wrote two books of poetry. After time spent at a horticultural college she began studying psychology and psychoanalysis at the University of London before working as a counsellor in a psychotherapy clinic. During the First World War she joined the Women's Land Army and established a company selling soy milk products. She became interested in esotericism through the teachings of the Theosophical Society, before joining an occult lodge led by Theodore Moriarty and then the Alpha et Omega occult organisation.

She came to believe that she was being contacted by two Ascended Masters, the Master Rakoczi and the Master Jesus, and underwent trance mediumship to channel the Masters' messages. In 1922 Fortune and Charles Loveday claimed that during one of these ceremonies they were contacted by Masters who provided them with a text, The Cosmic Doctrine. Although she became the president of the Christian Mystic Lodge of the Theosophical Society, she believed the society to be uninterested in Christianity, and split from it to form the Community of the Inner Light, a group later renamed the Fraternity of the Inner Light. With Loveday she established bases in both Glastonbury and Bayswater, London, began issuing a magazine, gave public lectures, and promoted the growth of their society. During the Second World War she organised a project of meditations and visualisations designed to protect Britain. She began planning for what she believed was a coming post-war Age of Aquarius, although she died of leukemia shortly after the war's end.

Fortune is considered one of the most significant occultists and ceremonial magicians of the early 20th century. The Fraternity she founded survived her and in later decades spawned a variety of related groups based upon her teachings. Her novels in particular proved an influence on later occult and modern Pagan groups such as Wicca.

== Biography ==
=== Early life: 1890–1913 ===
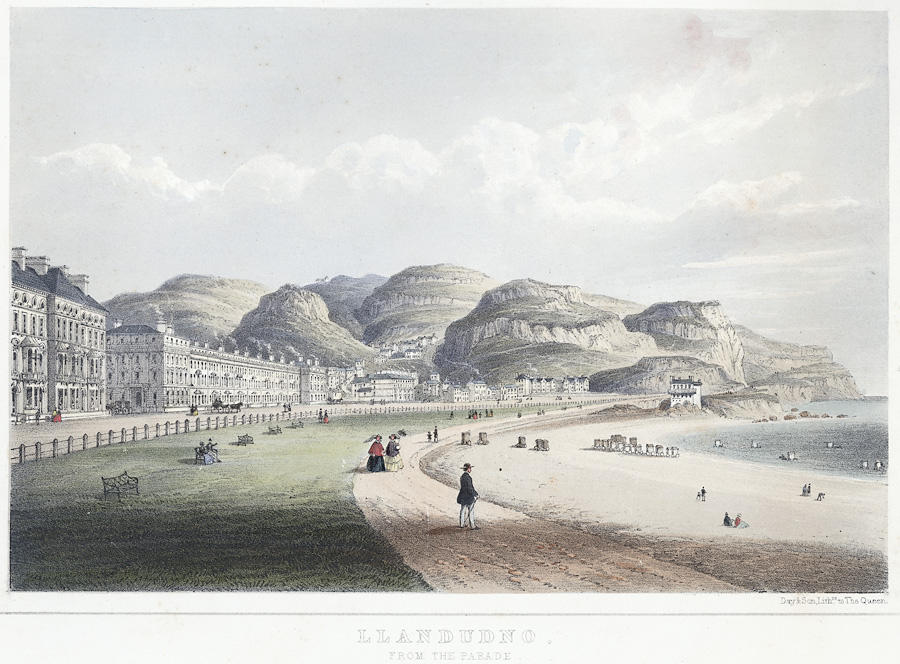
An illustration of Fortune's hometown, Llandudno, in 1860

Fortune was born Violet Mary Firth on 6 December 1890 at her family home on Bryn-y-Bia Road in Llandudno, North Wales. Her background was upper middle-class; the Firths were a wealthy English family who had gained their money through the steel industry in Sheffield, Yorkshire, where they had specialised in the production of guns. Fortune's paternal grandfather John Firth had devised a family motto, "Deo, non Fortuna" ("God, not Luck"), to mark out their nouveau riche status; she would later make use of it in creating her pseudonym.

One of John's sons – and Fortune's uncle – was the historian Charles Harding Firth, while her father, Arthur, had run a Sheffield law firm prior to establishing a hydropathic establishment in Limpley Stoke, Wiltshire. In August 1886 Arthur Firth married Sarah Jane Smith, before they relocated to Llandudno where Arthur established the new Craigside Hydrotherapeutic Establishment. Sarah was keenly interested in Christian Science, and Gareth Knight notes that both of Firth's parents were active practitioners of the religion, while fellow biographer Alan Richardson expresses doubt that there was sufficient evidence as to the seriousness with which Fortune herself regarded it.

Little is known about Fortune's time in Wales, in part because throughout her life she was deliberately elusive when providing biographical details about herself. In later life she reported that from the age of four she had experienced visions of Atlantis, something which she believed were past life memories. The Firths were still in Llandudno in 1900, although by 1904 Fortune was living in Somerset, south-west England. That year, she authored a book of poetry, titled Violets, which was likely published by her family. It was reviewed in the May 1905 volume of The Girls' Room, in which it was accompanied by the only known photograph of Fortune as a girl. In 1906, her second book of poetry, More Violets, was published.

After John Firth's death, Arthur moved with his family to London. According to Richardson they lived in the area around Liverpool Street in the east of the city, although Knight gives a different account, stating that they lived first in Bedford Park and then Kensington, both in the west of the city. From January 1911 to December 1912 Fortune studied at Studley Agricultural College in Warwickshire, a horticultural institution which advertised itself as being ideal for girls with psychological problems. Her proficiency with poultry led her to become a staff member at the college from January to April 1913. She later claimed that at the college she was the victim of mental manipulation from her employer, the college warden Lillias Hamilton, resulting in a mental breakdown that made her abandon the institution and return to her parental home.

=== Psychotherapy and esotericism: 1913–1922 ===
To recover from her experience at Studley, Fortune began studying psychotherapy. Her initial interest was in the work of Sigmund Freud and Alfred Adler, though she later moved on to that of Carl Jung. She studied psychology and psychoanalysis under John Flügel at the University of London, before gaining employment at a psychology clinic in London's Brunswick Square, which was likely run under the jurisdiction of the London School of Medicine for Women. Working as a counsellor from 1914 until 1916, she found that most of those she dealt with were coming to terms with sexual urges that were considered taboo in British society. Through her affiliation with the Society for the Study of Orthopsychics, she gave a series of lectures that were later published in 1922 as The Machinery of the Mind. While working at the clinic, she developed her interest in esotericism by attending lunchtime lectures organised by the Theosophical Society and reading some of the organisation's literature. With her interest in occultism increasing, Fortune became increasingly dissatisfied with the effectiveness of psychotherapy.

"The Order [of the Golden Dawn] suffered severely during the First World War, and Mathers himself died in Paris from influenza during the epidemic. When I came in touch with his organisation, it was manned mainly by widows and grey-bearded ancients, and did not appear to be a very promising field of occult endeavour. But I had considerable experience of practical occultism before I made its acquaintance, and I immediately recognised power of a degree and kind I had never met before, and had not the slightest doubt but that I was on the trail of the genuine tradition, despite its inadequate exposition."

— Dion Fortune.

After the United Kingdom entered the First World War, Fortune joined the Women's Land Army. She was initially stationed on a farm near to Bishop's Stortford on the borders between Essex and Hertfordshire, before later being relocated to an experimental base for the Food Production Department. There she carried out experiments in the production of soy milk, subsequently founding the Letchworth-based Garden City Pure Food Company to sell her products and publishing The Soya Bean: An Appeal to Humanitarians in 1925. It was while working at the base that she underwent a spiritual experience and subsequently further immersed herself in Theosophical literature. After doing so, she became preoccupied by the idea of the 'Ascended Masters' or 'Secret Chiefs', claiming to have had visions of two such entities, the Master Jesus and the Master Rakoczi.

Her first magical mentor was the Irish occultist and Freemason Theodore Moriarty. She had befriended him while still involved in psychotherapy, believing that he could help one of her patients, a young man who had been fighting on the Western Front and claimed to be plagued by unexplained physical phenomena. Moriarty performed an exorcism, claiming that the young man was the victim of the soul of a deceased East European soldier which had latched onto him as a parasite. Fortune became an acolyte of Moriarty's Masonic-influenced lodge, which was based in Hammersmith, and joined his community of followers living at Gwen Stafford-Allen's home in Bishop's Stortford. Moriarty spent much time talking about the lost city of Atlantis, a topic that would also come to be embraced by Fortune. Fortune later fictionalised Moriarty as the character Dr. Taverner, who appeared in a number of short stories first published in 1922, later assembled in a collected volume as The Secrets of Dr. Taverner in 1926. Like Moriarty, Dr. Taverner was portrayed as carrying out exorcisms to protect humans from the attacks of etheric vampires.

In tandem with her studies under Moriarty, in 1919 Fortune had been initiated into the London Temple of the Alpha et Omega, an occult group that had developed from the Hermetic Order of the Golden Dawn. Here, her primary teacher was Maiya Curtis-Webb, a longstanding friend of the Firth family. Fortune later claimed that in the period after the First World War, the Order had been "manned mainly by widows and grey-bearded ancients". She was not enamoured with the ceremonial magic system that had been developed by the Golden Dawn, however it did provide her with the grounding in the study of the Hermetic Qabalah which would exert a great influence over her esoteric world-view. It was also through her involvement in the group that she embraced her family's "Deo, non Fortuna" as her personal magical motto. In January and March 1921 Fortune and Curtis-Webb embarked on a series of experiments in trance mediumship. This culminated in an act of trance mediumship that Fortune conducted in the Somerset town of Glastonbury with her mother and Frederick Bligh Bond. She claimed that in doing so, she had contacted spirit-entities known as "the Watchers of Avalon" who informed her that Glastonbury had once been the site of an ancient druidic college. Bond subsequently commissioned Fortune to write an article, "Psychology and Occultism", which was published in the transactions of the College of Psychic Science in 1922.

=== Glastonbury and The Cosmic Doctrine: 1922–1926 ===
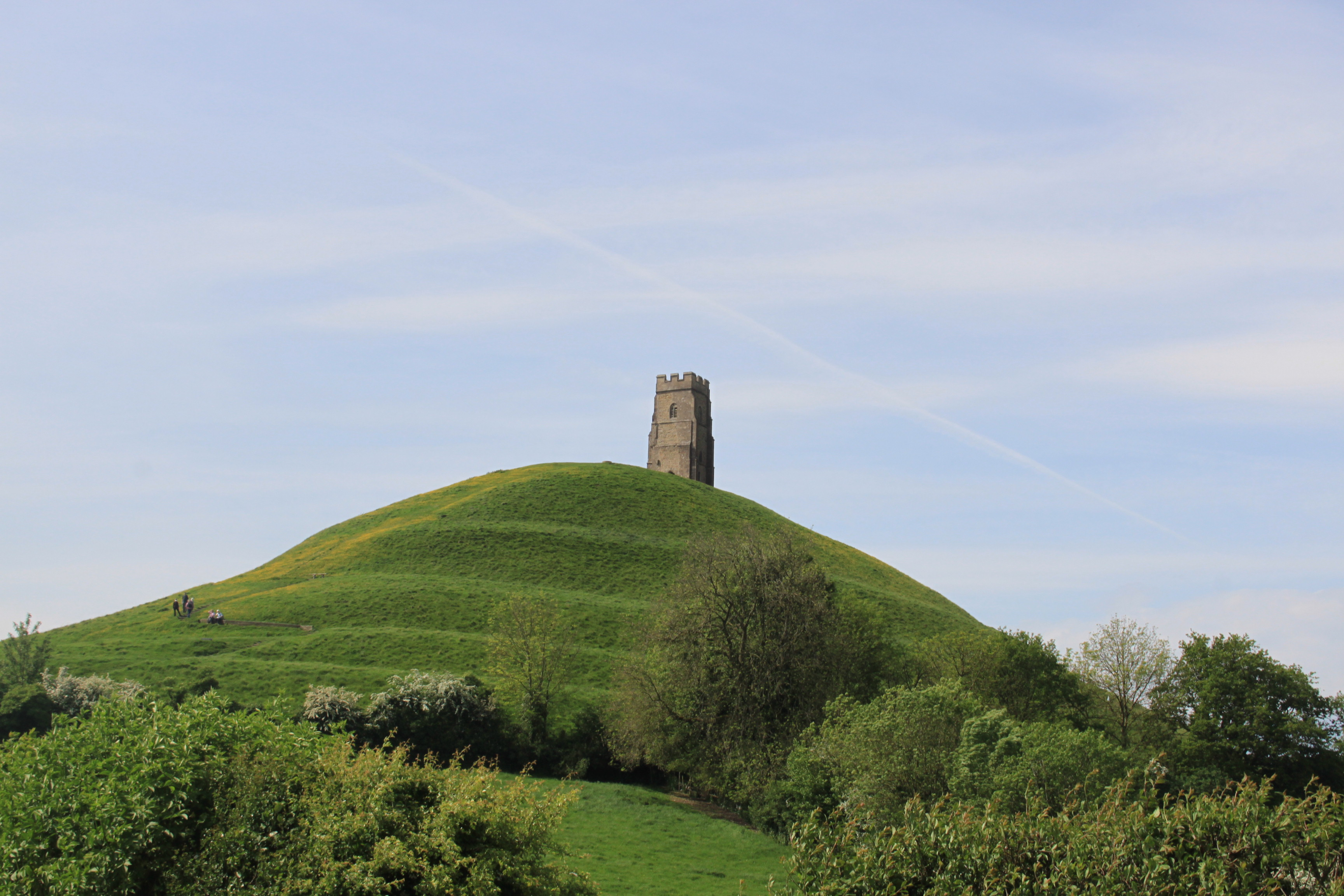
Glastonbury Tor

In September 1922, Fortune returned to Glastonbury to visit her friend Charles Loveday. Along with an anonymous woman known only as "E. P.", the pair carried out acts of trance mediumship, claiming that in doing so they entered into psychic contact with the Ascended Masters; Fortune later identified these as Socrates, Thomas Erskine, and a young military officer named David Carstairs who had died at the Battle of Ypres. Fortune and Loveday characterised their method of communication as "inspirational mediumship", believing that in this process the Masters communicated through the medium's subconscious mind; they contrasted this with "automatic mediumship", which they believed involved the medium becoming completely dissociated from their own body.

It was in this manner that Fortune and Loveday claimed that they received a text, The Cosmic Doctrine, which was dictated to them in segments by the Masters between July 1923 and February 1925. These communications discussed the existence of seven planes of the universe, and were very similar to the ideas promoted in Moriarty's writings, in particular his Aphorism of Creation and Cosmic Principles. The cosmology present in this book was also similar to that presented in Theosophy. In the following years, Fortune distributed this material among her senior students, before publishing an edited version of The Cosmic Doctrine in 1949.

In August 1923 Moriarty died, and Fortune—who had never been particularly popular among his followers—tried to convince them that she should be their new leader. A few accepted her offer, but many others instead accepted the leadership of Stafford-Allen. Meanwhile, Fortune's parents relocated to the garden city of Letchworth, Hertfordshire in 1922, and it was here that Fortune carried out what she deemed to be additional communications with the Masters through trance mediumship between 1923 and 1925.

On 20 August 1924, Fortune, Loveday, and others established themselves as a formal occult group. Fortune appointed herself as the group's "Adeptus", while five acolytes also joined. Loveday—who had inherited a number of properties from his father—sold some of them to fund the group's acquisitions. That year, they purchased a house on Queensborough Terrace in Bayswater, Central London to use as a temple and headquarters, renting out some of the rooms to tenants to finance their operation. While the top floors were used as living quarters, the middle floor contained the temple space, and the lower floors held an office and private library. The group soon grew; it admitted four initiates in 1925, six in 1926, and ten in 1927. In November 1926, a second degree was established into which these initiates could progress. In 1924, the group also obtained an old orchard at the foot of Glastonbury Tor, there erecting a hut and eventually a veranda and series of chalets. At Whitsun 1926, Fortune and several other members of her group were on Glastonbury Tor when they underwent a spiritual experience that produced a feeling of ecstasy among them. They later came to believe that this experience was a result of a messenger from the Elemental Kingdoms, and it greatly influenced their developing beliefs.

Fortune's activities—including her leadership of the new group and a series of articles that she wrote for The Occult Review—raised concerns for Alpha et Omega leader Moina Mathers. After Fortune suggested that her own organisation could serve as a feeder group to Mathers's Alpha et Omega, Mathers expelled her from the order, claiming that this was necessitated by Fortune having the wrong signs in her aura. Fortune later claimed that she subsequently came under psychic attack from Mathers, during which she was confronted and assaulted by both real and etheric cats.

=== The Theosophical Society and the Community of the Inner Light: 1927–1930 ===
Later claiming that she was acting under instruction from the Ascended Masters, Fortune and Loveday joined the Christian Mystic Lodge of the Theosophical Society, which was run by Daisy M. Grove. Fortune soon became its president, and under her leadership the group's membership expanded and the readership of its published Transactions also grew. Throughout this period, she foregrounded the need for a Christian perspective within the Theosophical movement, emphasising the centrality and importance of the 'Master Jesus' in her various articles. She publicly criticised another Theosophical group, the Liberal Catholic Church founded by J. I. Wedgwood and Charles Webster Leadbeater, alleging that it was not concerned with the Master Jesus and was instead preoccupied with the Master Maitreya. One of the prominent figures in the Church, Bishop Piggott, accused her of attributing false claims to him in The Occult Review.

Amid these arguments with other sectors of the Theosophical movement, she resigned from the Theosophical Society in October. Her Christian Mystic Lodge abandoned its affiliation with the Society and renamed itself the Community of the Inner Light. Within this Community was established a group called the Guild of the Master Jesus, which held regular church services on Sundays at their Queensborough Terrace base from 1928 until 1939; in 1936 this group renamed itself the Church of the Graal. Fortune directed many seekers who lacked the self-discipline for ceremonial magical activity to the Guild, whose members were known by one senior Community member as the "teeny-weenies".

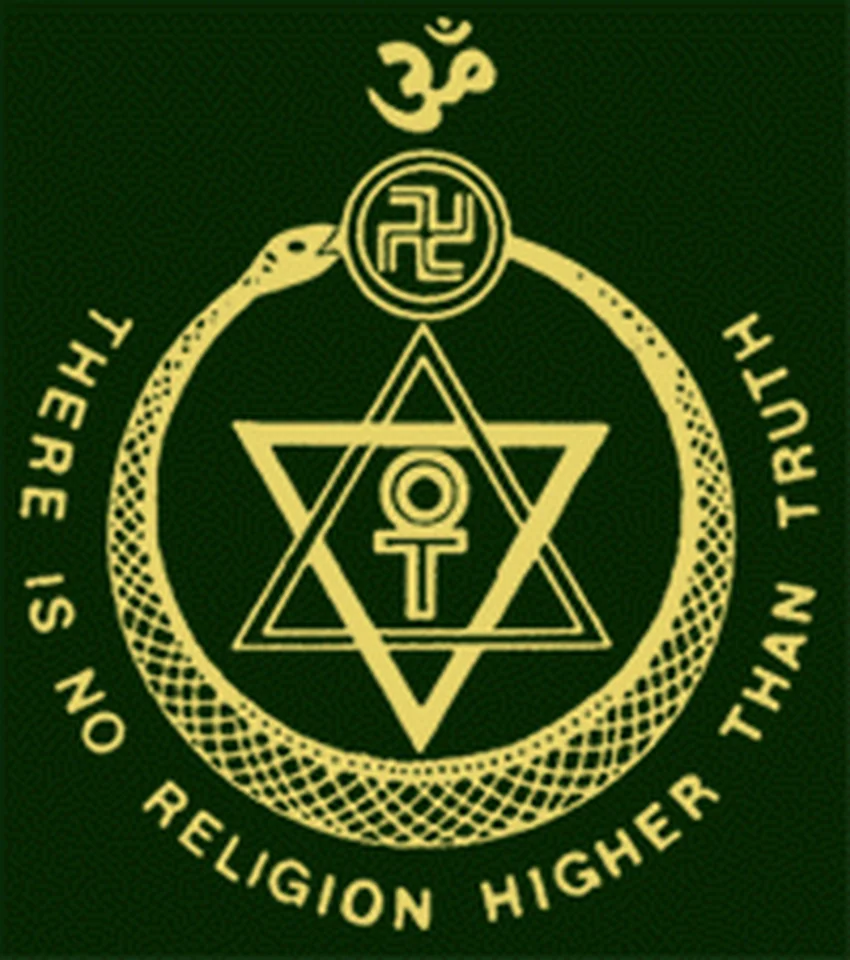
Fortune joined the Theosophical Society (logo pictured) but split from them on believing that they undermined the importance of Jesus as an Ascended Master

When Jiddu Krishnamurti abandoned Theosophy, causing problems for the Theosophical movement, Fortune endorsed the 'Back to Blavatsky' faction, attacking Leadbeater in print by accusing him of being a practitioner of black magic. She then involved herself with Bomanji Wadia and his United Lodge of Theosophists, through which she claimed to have contacted the Himalayan Masters. She nevertheless was cautious about these Himalayan adepts, relating that although she felt that they were "not evil", she thought them "alien and unsympathetic" and "hostile to my race". Unhappy with the concept of promoting Indian religious beliefs in Britain, she left the group. Subsequently, she claimed that Wadia had begun to psychically attack her.

In April 1927, Fortune married Tom Penry Evans—a Welsh medical doctor from a working-class background—at Paddington Registry Office, before the couple embarked on a honeymoon in Glastonbury. Their marriage was initially happy, although Evans may have been perturbed at having to immerse himself in occultism to a greater extent than he had planned. He was present throughout a program of trance mediumship in which Fortune claimed to be channelling the messages of a "Master of Medicine". Beginning in August 1927, the channelled messages focused around issues of alternative medicine and diagnostics and were later assembled as The Principles of Esoteric Medicine, which was privately circulated among Fortune's senior students. Some members of Fortune's group believed that the "Master of Medicine" was actually Paracelsus, although a later channelled message claimed that this Master's earthly identity had been Ignaz Semmelweis.

In 1927 Fortune published her first occult novel, The Demon Lover, which received a brief but positive review in The Times Literary Supplement. The following year she published The Problem of Purity, her final book to appear under the name of "Violet Firth". In 1928 she published a textbook on her esoteric beliefs, The Esoteric Orders and their Work, which she followed with a companion work in 1930, The Training and Work of an Initiate. In 1930 this was followed by Psychic Self-Defense, which contained many autobiographical elements and which was probably her most commercially popular book. According to the historian Claire Fanger, this book was "part anecdotal evidence, part do-it-yourself exorcism manual, part autobiography, and some part no doubt fiction."

Fortune and her group focused on 'Outer Court' work, which entailed engaging in publicity to boost membership. They held regular lectures at their Bayswater premises, with Fortune herself lecturing there twice a week for much of 1928. At their Glastonbury property, which they called the Chalice Orchard, they established a guest house and a social centre which was open in the summer, and where lectures were also carried out. In October 1927 they began production of a magazine, The Inner Light, with the initial print-run of 500 selling out in a fortnight. The magazine gained a wide readership, with many subscribers located outside of Britain. Within the group they formulated a three degree system, through which the initiate could progress as they gained a better knowledge and understanding of the group, its teachings, and its rituals. Progress through these degrees could be fairly rapid, with the only requirement being that an individual remain in one degree for at least three months before entering the next. Training in these three degrees was referred to as the 'Lesser Mysteries', allowing a practitioner to ascend into the 'Greater Mysteries'. The membership that they attracted was largely female, with 21 women to only 5 men being members in this period. All members, whether male or female, were initially referred to as "Brother", although this system later gave way to the term "Server Brother". At Midwinter 1928, they ritually established the Fraternity of the Inner Light—a sector of the group concerned with the 'Lesser Mysteries' that they could present to their membership—with Fortune, Evans, and Loveday as its principal officers.

=== Declining activity: 1930–1938 ===
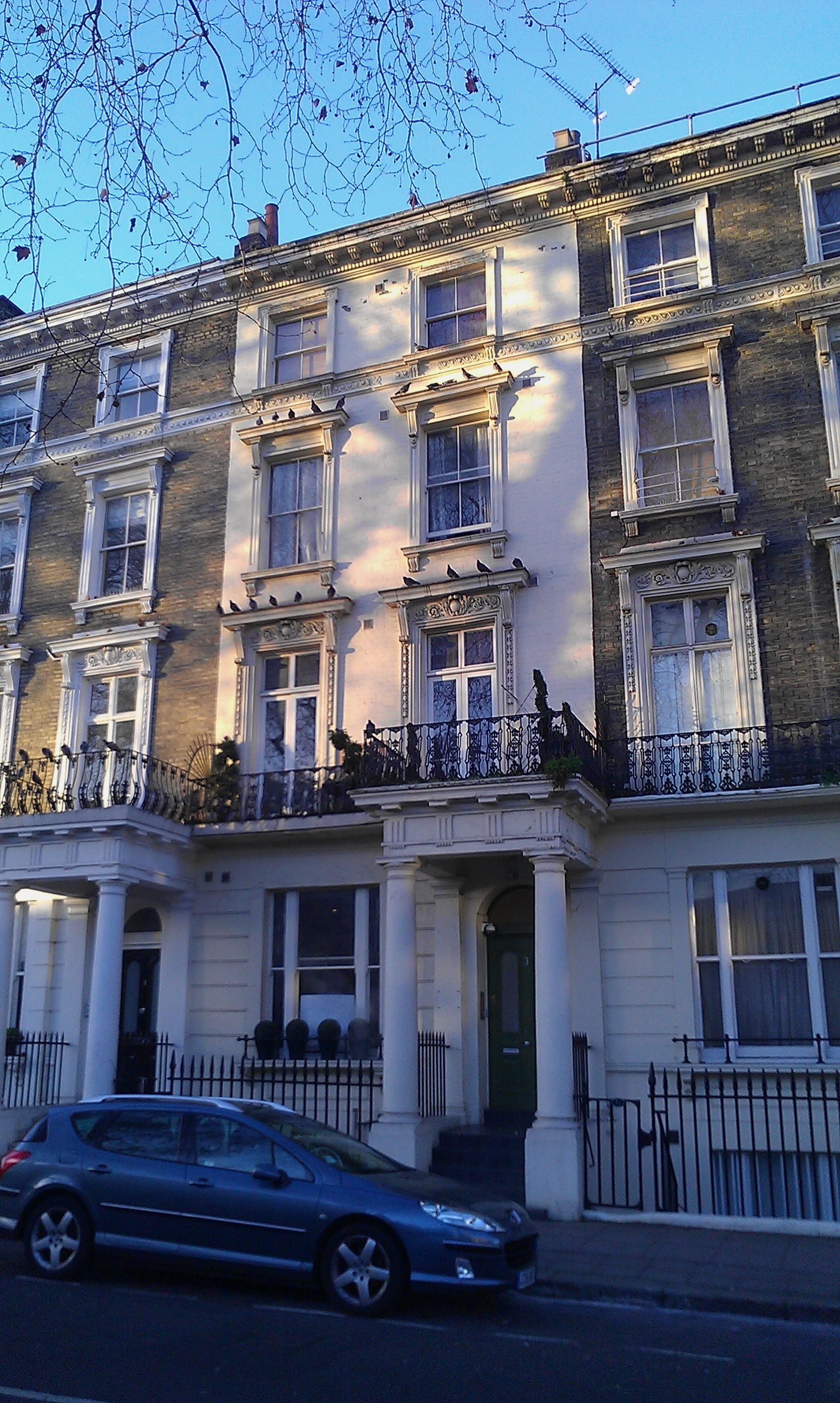
Number 3 Queensborough Terrace, Bayswater: headquarters of the Society of Inner Light from 1924

At the vernal equinox of 1930, Fortune declared that—with the 'Lesser Mysteries' and three degree system now properly established—she wanted to turn away from public work and focus on personal spiritual development. At the vernal equinox of 1931, Fortune stepped down as leader of the Fraternity, with Loveday being appointed Magus of the Lodge in her place. During the 1930s, Fortune's emphasis moved away from mediumship and towards ritual, while at the same time other Fraternity members embraced mediumship in order to channel the messages of the Masters. In late 1931, Fortune began mooting the idea of the construction of a permanent base, or Sanctuary, at the Chalice Orchard, and despite the economic obstacles of the Great Depression was able to raise sufficient funds. The group experienced a growth in the numbers attending its lectures, subscribing to its correspondence course, and using their private library; conversely, their Sunday services were not very popular, with a move from the morning to the evening seeing no effect. One significant individual who joined the Fraternity was Christine Campbell Thomson, who had been Fortune's literary agent since 1926. Fortune subsequently aided Thomson in separating from her abusive husband, after which she grew close to another Fraternity member, Colonel C. R. F. Seymour, in 1937. Although Seymour became a senior member of the Fraternity, relations between him and Fortune were strained, and during the Second World War he left London and settled in Liverpool, terminating his involvement with Fortune's Bayswater temple.

By 1933, tensions in Fortune's marriage were tearing it apart. There were rumours that Evans was having extra-marital affairs with other women, while Fortune confided in female members of the Fraternity that she had married him for magical reasons rather than because she loved him. Evans eventually asked for a divorce in order to marry another woman; Fortune was appalled, but did not contest it. Fortune had begun renting The Belfry, a converted Presbyterian chapel in West Halkin Street, where she then took up residence. It was here, during the latter 1930s, that she produced a number of rituals, among them the Rite of Isis and the Rite of Pan. As these and other aspects of her work testify, during the latter half of the decade Fortune had moved in what Richardson described as "an increasingly pagan orientation".

Fortune published many articles in Inner Light magazine, a number of which were collected together and published in books. In 1930, the first such collection was published as Mystical Meditations upon the Collects, in which Fortune emphasised her Christian commitments. In 1931 a number of her Inner Light articles on Spiritualism appeared as Spiritualism in the Light of Occult Science. In this book Fortune expressed reservations about Spiritualism. She drew a distinction between normal Spiritualist mediums and 'cosmic mediums' such as herself who contacted the Ascended Masters, also arguing that the spirits of the dead should not be contacted without good reason, a view that generated controversy among the occult milieu. In 1934, she assembled a number of her Inner Light articles on Glastonbury as Avalon of the Heart, while further Inner Light articles were assembled as Practical Occultism in Daily Life, a book aimed at a general reader. A number of Fortune's articles from The Occult Review were also collected to produce the book Sane Occultism.

Over four years, Fortune also published a number of articles in Inner Light that discussed the Hermetic Qabalah. These articles were then assembled as the book The Mystical Qabalah, which is widely perceived as a milestone in her esoteric career. While lambasting most of Fortune's works as "rather vulgar pot-boiling journalism", the writer Francis X. King characterised The Mystical Qabalah as "undoubtedly a classic of the Western Tradition". The work constituted a theoretical discussion based in the Golden Dawn system of correspondences to the Qabalic Tree of Life which she had obtained through her membership of the Alpha et Omega group. However, it was also rooted in her own personal experiences and visions; while meditating, she believed that she had visited the various Sephiroth of the Qabalic tree.

In 1935 Williams and Norgate published her second occult novel, The Winged Bull—which was again reviewed in The Times Literary Review—and in 1936 her third, The Goat-Foot God. The publisher declined The Sea Priestess, her fourth occult novel, which was subsequently self-published through the Fraternity in 1938. Her final novel, Moon Magic, was apparently left unfinished prior to the outbreak of the Second World War; a protégé later completed it, claiming to have done so through channeling Blavatsky's disembodied spirit, and it was published posthumously.

Fortune corresponded with a number of prominent occultists in this period. One of these was Israel Regardie, whose book The Tree of Life was regarded by Fortune as "quite the best book on magic" that she had read. Regardie later publicly criticised her for misrepresenting his works in her reviews of them; she had claimed that his works bolstered her beliefs about the Masters, although Regardie insisted that he was sceptical about the existence of such entities. Fortune also corresponded with Olga Fröbe-Kapteyn, the Dutch esotericist who founded Eranos in Switzerland. She also renewed her interest in Jungian psychology, which was then growing in influence among the esoteric milieu, and was influenced by her reading of Friedrich Nietzsche's The Birth of Tragedy.

=== Later life: 1939–1946 ===
The outbreak of the Second World War in September 1939 saw some of the Fraternity's members enlist in the armed forces, putting a stop to many of the group's activities. From October 1939 through to October 1942, Fortune organised group meditations every Sunday with the intent of focusing Fraternity members towards the cause of peace. In February 1940, she undertook a visualisation in which she imagined angelic forces patrolling Britain's coast, believing that in doing so she was helping to make these forces a reality. She urged Fraternity members to repeat a mantra every time the German Luftwaffe began bombing Britain, through which she hoped to call upon "Invisible Helpers" from the "Inner Planes" to aid the people affected. The Fraternity's London headquarters were damaged during the Blitz, although roofing repairs were made and the group were able to move back into the building after a week. In August 1940, the group had to suspend publication of Inner Light as a result of paper shortages in Britain.

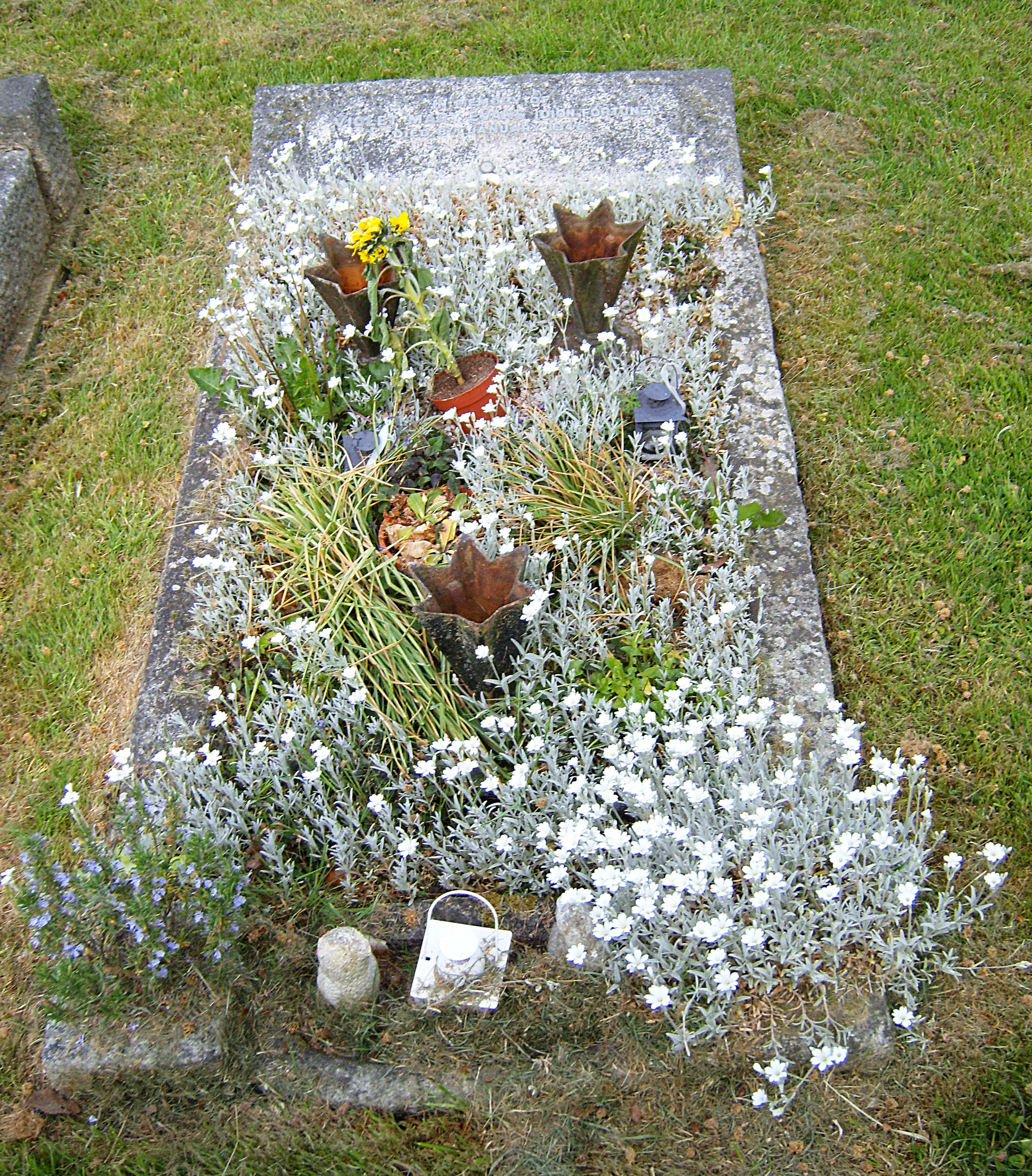
Fortune's grave in Glastonbury Cemetery

After the United States entered the conflict in December 1941, Fortune began assembling plans for the post-war period, believing it would mark the dawning of the Age of Aquarius. In the spring of 1942 the Fraternity recommenced the Guild's Sunday services, and in March 1943 Fortune announced a new study course for aspiring members. As part of her plans for the post-war period, Fortune began mooting the idea of bringing together all of Europe's occultists to pool their knowledge. She also began discussing the possibility of uniting occult groups with the Spiritualist movement, writing articles that were more favourable towards Spiritualist mediums than she had previously been and meeting with Charles Richard Cammell, the editor of Light—the magazine of the College of Psychic Studies—who then published a favourable article about her. By at least 1942, Fortune corresponded with the prominent occultist and ceremonial magician Aleister Crowley, praising him as "a genuine adept" despite the many differences between their respective occult philosophies. She later visited him at his home in Hastings, with Crowley's assistant Kenneth Grant noting that the pair got along well.

In August 1940, Fortune embarked on a further project of trance mediumship, this time with her Alpha et Omega mentor, Curtis-Webb (now renamed Maiya Tranchall-Hayes), in the hope of contacting the same Masters who they believed had aided the Hermetic Order of the Golden Dawn. In doing so, they believed that they were channelling messages from an entity known as "the Shemesh of the Aquarian Age". These communications were received between April 1941 and February 1942, and together became known as "the Arthurian Formula"; they provided the basis of much of the Fraternity's 'Greater Mystery' work following the war. The claims produced in these channelled meditations presented the Arthurian myths as racial memories that had been passed down from Atlantis, having been brought to Britain by Atlantean settlers after the cataclysm that destroyed their island. It also set forward a threefold system of training: that of Arthur and his Round Table Fellowship, that of Merlin and the Faery Woman, and that of Guinevere and the Forces of Love.

In late 1945, Fortune fell ill, and was unable to give her scheduled address to the Fraternity on that year's winter solstice. She died at Middlesex Hospital of leukaemia in January 1946, at the age of 55. Her body was transferred to Glastonbury, where it was buried in a funeral overseen by the Reverend L. S. Lewis, vicar of St. John's Church. When Loveday died shortly after, he was buried close to her. She bequeathed most of her money to her Society. During Fortune's lifetime, some of the Fraternity members had expressed concerns with regard to the organisation becoming a personality cult revolving around her, and so following her death they did not encourage an interest in her biography. Members of the society have alleged that her successor destroyed most of her diaries, correspondences, and photographs. However, a number of her books would be published posthumously, among them The Cosmic Doctrine, which appeared in 1949, and her novel Moon Magic, published in 1956.

== Novels ==
"Had Dion devoted her formidable powers and considerable talents to writing pure and simple, she could have been a great novelist by orthodox standards; or if not a novelist in the first division, at least a promotion challenger from the second. As it was, in her last two novels, The Sea Priestess and Moon Magic, she achieved greatness within the genre. Quite simply these are the finest novels on magic ever written. Really, looking around at the competition, they are the only novels on magic ever written."

— Fortune's biographer Alan Richardson.

Fortune completed seven novels during her lifetime. Four were occult and fantasy themed: The Demon Lover, The Winged Bull, The Goat-Foot God, and The Sea Priestess. The literary scholar Susan Johnson Graf categorises these alongside the work of H. Rider Haggard, Algernon Blackwood, Charles Williams, and Arthur Machen. The other three were romantic thrillers published under the pseudonym of "V. M. Steele": The Scarred Wrists, Hunters of Humans, and Beloved of Ishmael. Writing thrillers was one of few activities Fortune took part in unconnected to her magical work, and was something she did not publicise. Knight believed these three novels testified to the idea that "she must really have loved writing for writing's sake". An eighth novel, Moon Magic, was left unfinished but completed by her protégé and published posthumously.

Fortune saw her occult novels as an important part of her Fraternity work, initiating readers into the realms of occultism by speaking to their subconscious, even when their conscious mind rejects occult teachings. She thus perceived them as a means of disseminating her teachings to a wider audience. Each was related to one of the Sephirah on the Qabalic Tree of Life: The Winged Bull was associated with Tiphareth, The Goat-Foot God with Malkuth, and The Sea Priestess with Yesod.

Fortune's first novel was The Demon Lover, which tells the story of Veronica Mainwaring, a young virgin woman who becomes the secretary to a malevolent magician, Justin Lucas, who seeks to exploit her latent mediumistic powers for his own purposes. Although she falls in love with him, she eventually escapes his entrapments through her devotion to Christianity. Her next work, The Winged Bull, focuses on Ursula Brangwyn, who had been harmed by her involvement in an unscrupulous occult group but meets with Ted Murchison, whom she subsequently marries. The characters in The Winged Bull are based upon real people in Fortune's life; Murchison is based on her husband, for example, and she modeled Brangwyn after herself. The character of Hugo Astley has been interpreted as a "barely veiled fictional portrait" of Aleister Crowley. Richardson felt that The Winged Bull was "in many ways the worst of her books". The scholar Andrew Radford suggested that the novel reflected a "zeal in promoting a socially responsible occultism rooted in orthodox gender roles" and demonstrated her growing concern that occultism was increasingly being associated with what she regarded as an immoral cosmopolitan elite synonymous with Crowley and his activities.

The Goat-Foot God revolves around a wealthy widower, Hugh Patson, who teams up with an esoteric bookseller to seek out the ancient Greek god Pan. They achieve this with the aid of a poverty-stricken artist, Mona Wilton, who becomes close to Patson as the novel progresses. Richardson described The Goat-Foot God as "a masterpiece ... the finest occult novel ever written". The Sea Priestess is about Wilfred Maxwell, a man living with his mother and sister who learns to commune with the Moon after an asthma attack. He meets with Le Fay Morgan, a spiritual adept, and together they enter an obsessive (on Wilfred's part) but platonic relationship while establishing a temple to the sea gods.

Fortune's novels all follow the same basic theme: a heroine – a priestess and initiatrix who is magically experienced and assertive – who meets a man and saves him from himself. In her later novels this entails the duos reconstructing or revitalising a ritual space and working magical rituals to channel cosmic forces and bring them into balance.

"As a writer, Fortune's gifts are generally more practical than philosophical. Above all she was a deft synthesizer of ideas, and her continued influence derives largely from her ability to bring difficult esoteric concepts into a lucid and readily accessible prose."

— Historian Claire Fanger.

In her discussion of Fortune's work, Sonja Sadovsky stated that the "unique element" of Fortune's fiction was "the recurring plotline of esoteric romance told from the priestess's viewpoint", suggesting that her female characters provided a template from which female readers could build upon in their own spiritual practice. Sadovsky further suggested that there were two types of priestess who appeared in Fortune's novels, the "Earth Mother" and the "Moon Mistress". According to Sadovsky, the "Earth Mother" was represented by the character of Mona Wilkins in The Goat-Foot God and that of Molly Coke in The Sea Priestess. She suggested that these characters derived their power from the masculine/feminine polarity and the creative power of sex, and that they also required a male priest in order to initiate them into their spiritual mysteries and to reach their full potential. The second type of priestess, the "Moon Mistress", appeared as Vivien/Lilith le Fay Morgan in The Sea Priestess and then becomes more dominant in Moon Magic. According to Sadovsky, this is a celibate figure who concentrates her creative powers on training priestesses and dealing with occult matters.

== Belief and teachings ==
=== Religion and race ===
Fortune identified her beliefs as being part of what she termed "the Western Mystery Tradition". She adhered to a form of esoteric Christianity, and has been described as a Christian Qabalist, and as "a devout mystical Christian", albeit "a very unorthodox one". She expressed the opinion that "in any school of Western mysticism the author and finisher of our faith must be Christ Jesus, the Great Initiator of the West", and treated "the Master Jesus" as her personal spiritual guide. She believed that the teachings passed down from the Hermetic Order of the Golden Dawn served the purpose of recovering "sacred mysteries" or gnosis that had been overlooked by mainstream Christianity. Accordingly, she had no allegiance to any established Christian churches and was often critical of mainstream clergy. Moreover, she rejected a number of traditional Christian doctrines, such as that surrounding Heaven and Hell.

However she is also rightly described as a student of Hermetic Qabalah. Indeed Knight recognises that her work was Hermetic in nature, "Whether she realised it or not, for this was before Frances Yates had made the roots of the Hermetic tradition more accessible..."

There is no evidence that Fortune considered herself to be a Pagan. However, by the late 1930s, Fortune had developed some interest in the religion of ancient Egypt, but treated it as a preparation for the higher truth of Christianity. In the 1930s her attitude began to change as she became more favourable to pre-Christian religion, likely under the influence of her husband, Seymour, and D. H. Lawrence's The Rainbow, of which she was a fan. By The Winged Bull, she was declaring that pre-Christian gods were just as valid as facets of the divine as the Christian God, and around this time she began to adopt an increasingly critical attitude to Christianity, stating that it had been greatly degraded since its origins and distorted by "those two crusty old bachelors", Paul the Apostle and Augustine of Hippo. In her next novel, The Goat-Foot God, Fortune had fully embraced the idea of a modern Paganism reviving the belief systems of pre-Christian Europe, referring to this as "Vitamin P" and declaring that it was needed to heal the modern world. Around this time she began promoting the claim that "All the gods are one god, and all the goddesses are one goddess". However, during the Second World War her writings became more pronouncedly Christian once again.

Fortune believed in the existence of an underlying commonality between the teachings of Western esoteric orders and Asian religious traditions. Nevertheless, she believed that particular spiritual traditions were allotted to specific racial groups, stating that "the Great White Lodge gives to each race the religion suited to its needs". Writing in The Occult Review, Fortune stated: "Do not let it be forgotten that our traditions are racial. What that great initiate Rudolf Steiner did for the German-speaking races someone must do for those who use a Latin-root language and the Anglo-Saxon tongue." She did not agree with allowing spiritual and magical techniques to transmit between different cultures, believing that to do so caused damage; she for instance cautioned against allowing Western esoteric teachings to be practised in India because "the Hindu dies readily from shock". Equally she strongly opposed the adoption of Asian religious techniques into Western esotericism, distancing herself from occultists who did so. In her words, she must "recommend to the white races the traditional Western system, which is admirably adapted to their psychic constitution". She nevertheless perceived value in Westerners studying Asian disciplines like Yoga on a theoretical level, so long as they eschewed any attempt to put these teachings into practice. The religious studies scholar Gordan Djurdjevic highlighted that 21st century readers would likely deem there to be "a strong cultural essentialism and even racial prejudice in her writings", but that ideas regarding the close relationship between "culture, race, and religion" were "a part of everyday discourse" in Britain during her lifetime.

=== Magic ===
Fortune was a ceremonial magician. The magical principles on which her Fraternity was based were adopted from the late nineteenth century Hermetic Order of the Golden Dawn, with other influences coming from Theosophy and Christian Science. The magical ceremonies performed by Fortune's Fraternity were placed into two categories: initiations, in which the candidate was introduced to magical forces, and evocation, in which these forces were manipulated for a given purpose.

The Fraternity's rituals at their Bayswater temple were carried out under a dim light, with Fortune claiming that bright light disperses etheric forces. An altar was placed in the centre of a room, with the colours of the altar-cloth and the symbols on the altar varying according to the ceremony being performed. A light was placed on the altar while incense, usually frankincense, was burned. The senior officers sat in a row along the eastern end of the room, while officers—who were believed to be channels for cosmic forces—were positioned at various positions on the floor. The lodge was opened by walking around the room in a circle chanting, with the intent of building a psychic force up as a wall. Next, the cosmic entities would be invoked, with the members believing that these entities would manifest in astral form and interact with the chosen officers.

Fortune was particularly concerned with the issue of sex. In her early works she displayed a prudish attitude regarding sexuality, warning her readers about the perceived perils of masturbation, extra-marital sex, same-sex sexual activity, abortion, and free love. The only form of sexual expression that she considered appropriate was that between a heterosexual married couple, and she promoted a form of 'psychic masturbation' to quell any sexual urges that a celibate individual may have. According to Richardson, she was "a prude, at least by today's standards". In her later works she exhibited a more positive attitude toward sexuality, describing the sexual union between a man and woman as the most powerful expression of a "life-force" which flows throughout the universe. She believed that this erotic attraction between men and women could be harnessed for use in magic. She urged her followers to be naked under their robes when carrying out magical rituals, for this would increase the creative sexual tension between the men and women present. Although sex features in her novels, it is never described in graphic detail. Nevertheless, her later occult novels entail depictions of heterosexual sex outside of marriage, suggesting that by this point Fortune no longer believed that sex must be restrained to wedlock. The scholar Andrew Radford noted that Fortune's "reactionary and highly heteronormative" view of "sacralised sexuality" should be seen as part of a wider tradition among esoteric currents, going back to the ideas of Emanuel Swedenborg and Andrew Jackson Davis and also being found in the work of occultists like Paschal Beverly Randolph and Ida Craddock.

Fortune was among those who popularised the idea of a division between the left-hand path and right-hand path which had been introduced to Western esotericism by the Theosophist Helena Blavatsky. In doing so Fortune connected her disparaging views on what she considered to be the left hand path to the moral panic surrounding homosexuality in British society. Her works contained commentaries in which she condemned the "homosexual techniques" of malevolent male magicians, and she claimed that the acceptance of homosexuality was the cause of the downfall of the ancient Greek and Roman civilisations. The manner in which she sought to demonise the left hand path has been compared to that found in the work of English novelist Dennis Wheatley.

== Personality and personal life ==
The historian Claire Fanger noted that Fortune exhibited a "dynamic personality and confident leadership". Janine Chapman, an esotericist who researched Fortune's life, stated that "in her prime", Fortune was "a strong, magnetic personality" with "an active, intellectually curious mind" who was also "physically imposing". Chapman noted that while studying at horticultural college, Fortune had earned a reputation for having a "keen sense of humor", being particularly fond of practical jokes. Richardson characterised Fortune as being "honest, and often ruthless with her honesty", adding that she was "an essentially good woman who had strands of darkness within". Chapman noted that she "set an example of super-achievement, self-sacrifice, and personal integrity" and that "sexually, she was modest, faithful, and chaste". In her later years, she earned a nickname among her friends in the Fraternity; "The Fluff".

Chapman characterised Fortune's marriage as "rocky", and the marriage produced no children. In later life, there were unsubstantiated rumours that Fortune had sexual relationships with both men and women, and in particular that she had a relationship with Tranchall-Hayes.

Fortune did not involve herself or her group in any explicitly political movement or party. The historian Ronald Hutton noted that in her political and social views, Fortune was likely a High Tory, with Richardson noting that politically, she was "somewhat aligned" to the ideas of the Conservative politician Winston Churchill. Graf noted that although Fortune was not involved in the feminist movement and did not associate with feminists, she "thought herself every bit as powerful, capable, independent, and discerning as any man, and she worked to spiritually empower women." When staying at Queensborough, Fortune kept to a vegetarian diet.

== Reception and legacy ==
According to Richardson, Fortune fell into "relative obscurity" after her death, having been overshadowed by her more famous contemporary, Aleister Crowley. The historian of esotericism Dave Evans agreed, stating that Fortune had been "somewhat less" influential than Crowley. Hutton nevertheless considered her to be the "foremost female figure" of early 20th century British occultism, while historian Alex Owen referred to her as "one of the most significant clairvoyants and occultists of the postwar period". Similarly, Knight termed her "one of the leading occultists of her generation", and the anthropologist Tanya Luhrmann referred to her as "one of the most influential twentieth-century magicians". Another esotericism scholar, Nicholas Goodrick-Clarke, said Fortune was an "important heir of the Golden Dawn, and she had a significant influence on modern Western esotericism". Religious studies scholar Stephen Sutcliffe described her as having "played a key role in the cult of Glastonbury in the interwar years", while anthropologist Susan Greenwood thought Fortune's emphasis on a masculine/feminine polarity as the basis for magical working was a significant influence on both later ceremonial magic and Wicca.

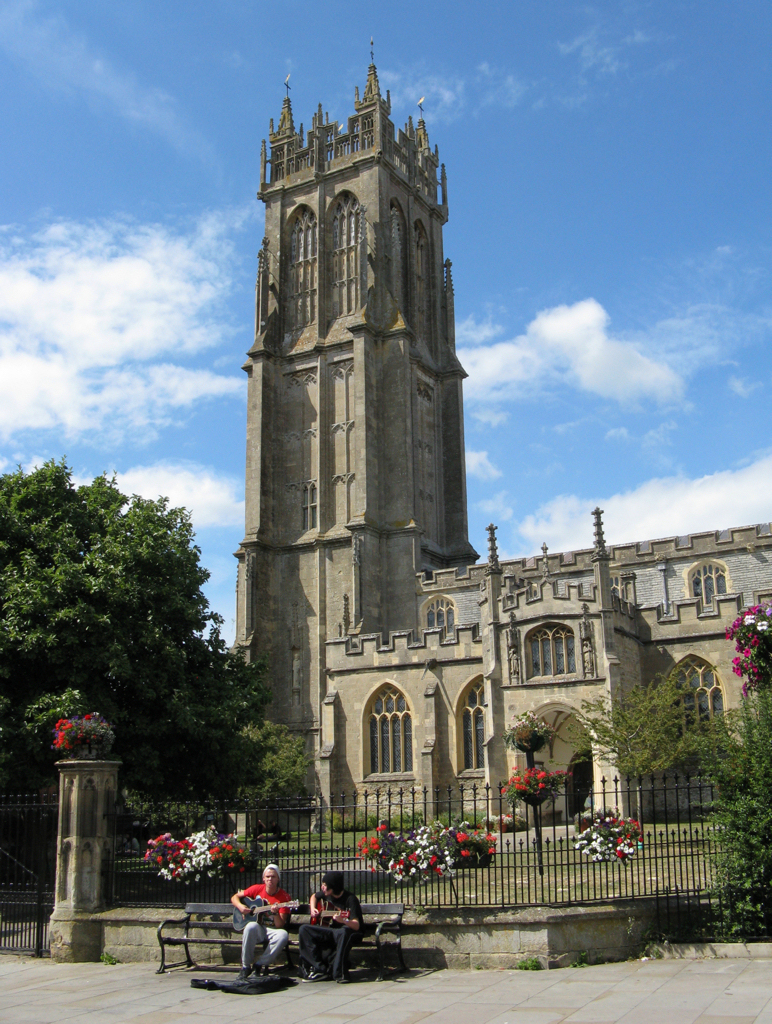
The church of St. John the Baptist, Glastonbury; Fortune's funeral was performed here by the Reverend L. S. Lewis, and her body interred in the Wells Road cemetery nearby

Fortune's Fraternity survived her, and was renamed the Society of the Inner Light in 1946; the change was a legal refinement to help the group achieve charitable status. It continues to operate into the early 21st century. The Society sold the Chalice Orchard, which was eventually purchased by Geoffrey Ashe, and in 1959 sold their Bayswater headquarters after the socio-economic decline of the area, instead establishing a base in North London. While retaining its basis in Fortune's original teachings, the Society has changed its emphasis according to who has led it over the years. At various points it has been heavily influenced by Alice Bailey's ideas about the Ascended Masters, the ideas of Subud, and the use of Scientology's E-meters. In 1961, the Society adopted a new approach which further emphasised and foregrounded its Christian identity. This generated controversy in the group, with Gareth Knight leaving to form his own lodge based on Fortune's teachings, known as the Gareth Knight Group. In 1973 one of Fortune's students, W. E. Butler, likewise split with the Fraternity to found his own group in Jersey, the Servants of the Light, which would later be taken over by Dolores Ashcroft-Nowicki and remains one of the world's largest esoteric organizations in the early 21st century maintaining about 1000 active students. In 1975, another member of the Society, Alan Adams, departed to start the London Group, which was initially based in outer London but later moved to the East Midlands.

By the late 1990s the Society's membership had dropped to a few dozen, and under the control of a new warden it invited Knight to return to the group in order to help promote it. Knight agreed, leaving his own lodge to publish two works by Fortune based on her material in the Society's archive, and authoring a biography of her. The 1990s saw a number of pioneering biographical studies of Fortune, including Alan Richardson's in 1991 and Janine Chapman's in 1993. Richardson's book relied heavily on the recollections of Christine Hartley, while the publication of Fielding and Carr was based upon the authors' interactions with older members of the Society. However, in 2007 Graf noted that Fortune had yet to receive much scholarly attention.

In the early 21st century, Evans noted that Fortune's work was "still influential in some magical quarters", highlighting that in his experience she was one of only three female ceremonial magicians—alongside Leah Hirsig and Jaq Hawkins—that modern esotericists could readily name.

=== Fortune's literary influence on modern Paganism ===
"Through her novels and her theoretical occult works, Dion Fortune has left a legacy that is rich and potent for those who choose to adopt a goddess-centered religion. Fortune laid the groundwork that has been followed by later neo-pagans and goddess-centered practitioners who want to find a religion that is not patriarchal and offers divine images other than that of a male god or a passive, human, mother of god. The practices and beliefs that Fortune found, and has passed on, offer a balance of power, a kind a partnership model for the divine."

— Literary scholar Susan Johnston Graf.

The religious studies scholar Hugh Urban noted that Fortune was "one of the key links" between early twentieth-century ceremonial magic and the developing Pagan religion of Wicca. Similarly, the Wiccan high priestess Vivianne Crowley characterised Fortune as a "proto-Pagan". The scholar and esotericist Nevill Drury stated that Fortune "in many ways anticipated feminist ideas in contemporary Wicca", particularly through her belief that all goddesses were a manifestation of a single Great Goddess. Graf agreed, adding that Fortune's works found "resonance" in the work of the later feminist Wiccan Starhawk, and in particular in the latter's 1979 book, The Spiral Dance.

In researching ceremonial magic orders and other esoteric groups active in the London area during the 1980s, Luhrmann found that within them, Fortune's novels were treated as "fictionalized ideals" and that they were recommended to newcomers as the best way to understand magic. The Pagan studies scholar Joanne Pearson added that Fortune's books, and in particular the novels The Sea Priestess and Moon Magic, were owned by many Wiccans and other Pagans. The religious studies scholar Graham Harvey compared The Sea Priestess to the Wiccan Gerald Gardner's 1949 novel High Magic's Aid, stating that while neither were "great literature", they "evoke Paganism better than later more didactic works".

Fortune's priestesses were an influence on the characters of Marion Zimmer Bradley's The Mists of Avalon, and her ideas were adopted as the basis for the Aquarian Order of the Restoration, a ceremonial magic group led by Bradley. Her works also influenced Bradley's collaborator and fellow Order member Diana Paxson. As of 2007, Fortune's latter three novels remained in print and had a wide readership. Evans nevertheless believed that her writings were "stuck in their era" in many places; as evidence, he highlighted passages in which Fortune warns her readers that their Indian servants may steal their body waste products for use in the worship of the Hindu goddess Kali.

== Bibliography ==
=== Non-fiction ===
Year of publication	Title	Publisher
1922	The Machinery of the Mind *	Dodd, Mead and Company
1924	The Esoteric Philosophy of Love and Marriage	W. Rider & Son
1925	The Psychology of the Servant Problem *	C. W. Daniel Company
1925	The Soya Bean	C.W. Daniel Company
1928	The Problem of Purity *	Rider & Company
1928	The Esoteric Orders and Their Work	Rider & Company
1929	Sane Occultism	Rider & Company
1930	Mystical Meditations on the Collects	Rider & Company
1930	Psychic Self-Defense	Rider & Company
1930	The Training and Work of an Initiate	Rider & Company
1931	Spiritualism in the Light of Occult Science	Rider & Company
1932	Through the Gates of Death	The Inner Light Publishing Society
1934	Avalon of the Heart *	Frederick Muller
1935	The Mystical Qabalah	Williams and Norgate
1935	Practical Occultism in Daily Life	Aquarian Press
1949	The Cosmic Doctrine	Aquarian Press
1962	Aspects of Occultism	Aquarian Press
1962	Applied Magic	Aquarian Press
1969	The Magical Battle of Britain: The War Letters of Dion Fortune (edited by Gareth Knight)	Golden Gate Press
1999	Principles of Hermetic Philosophy (edited by Gareth Knight)	Thoth Publications
1997	An Introduction to Ritual Magic (with Gareth Knight)	Thoth Publications

* = Published under the name "Violet M. Firth"

=== Fiction ===
A list of Fortune's fiction works was provided by Knight:

Year of publication	Title	Publisher
1922 (published as short stories); 1926 (collected volume)	The Secrets of Dr. Taverner	Noel Douglas (collected volume)
1927	The Demon Lover	Noel Douglas
1935	The Winged Bull	Williams and Norgate
1935	The Scarred Wrists *	Stanley Paul
1935	Hunters of Humans *	Stanley Paul
1936	Beloved of Ishmael *	Stanley Paul
1936	The Goat-Foot God	Williams and Norgate
1938	The Sea Priestess	Inner Light Publishing Company
1957	Moon Magic	Aquarian Press

* = Published under the name "V. M. Steele"

== See also ==
- Margaret Lumley Brown
