= Richard Saller =

American classicist & university president

12th President of Stanford University
- In office September 1, 2023 – July 31, 2024
- Preceded by: Marc Tessier-Lavigne
- Succeeded by: Jonathan Levin

Personal details
- Born: Richard Paul Saller; October 18, 1952 (age 73)
- Spouse: Tanya Luhrmann
- Education: University of Illinois, Urbana-Champaign (BA, BA); Jesus College, Cambridge (PhD)

Academic background
- Thesis: Patronage and Social Mobility in the Aristocracies of the Principate (1978)
- Doctoral advisor: Peter Garnsey

Academic work
- Discipline: European studies
- Institutions: University of Chicago; Stanford University

Richard Paul Saller (born October 18, 1952) is an American classicist and academic who served as the twelfth president of Stanford University from 2023 to 2024. He is the former provost of the University of Chicago and the former dean of the Stanford University School of Humanities and Sciences.

On July 19, 2023, Stanford University president Marc Tessier-Lavigne announced he would resign. Stanford University's board of trustees appointed Saller to serve as an interim president beginning on September 1.

In October 2023, The Stanford Daily asked the Board of Trustees to clarify if Saller was promoted to a full presidential term and be counted as the 12th president and not remain "interim", but the Board declined to answer.

He was formally inaugurated during a private ceremony as the 12th president and delivered his speech to the Board of Trustees and a small gathering of University officials and faculty on October 16, 2023.

== Early life and education ==
Saller was born in 1952. He earned two Bachelor of Arts in history and ancient Greek at the University of Illinois, Urbana-Champaign, in 1974 and his Ph.D. from Jesus College, Cambridge, in 1978.

== Career ==
=== University of Chicago ===
From 1979 to 1984 Saller was assistant professor at Swarthmore College. In 1984, Saller began teaching Roman social and economic history at the University of Chicago. He became a dean in 1994 and the university's provost in 2002. As dean, he attracted controversy for asking the university to shut down its educational department. He received the Quantrell Award.

=== Stanford ===
In April 2007, Saller was made the dean of the School of Humanities and Sciences at Stanford University. He stepped down in September 2018 to teach full-time.

== Awards and distinctions ==
Since 1986, the Saller Dissertation Prize has been awarded at University of Chicago for outstanding dissertations.

== Personal life ==
Saller is married to anthropologist Tanya Luhrmann.

== Publications ==
=== Books ===
- Saller, Richard P. (1982). Personal Patronage under the Early Empire. Cambridge: Cambridge University Press.
- Garnsey, Peter; Saller, Richard P. (1987). The Roman Empire: Economy, Society and Culture. Cambridge: Cambridge University Press.
- Saller, Richard P. (1994). Patriarchy, Property and Death in the Roman Family. Cambridge: Cambridge University Press.
- Saller, Richard P. (2022). Pliny's Roman Economy: Natural History, Innovation, and Growth. Cambridge: Cambridge University Press.
