= Dolores Ashcroft-Nowicki =

British occult writer and psychic (1929–2026)

Dolores Ashcroft-Nowicki (11 June 1929 – 8 January 2026) was a British occult writer, third generation psychic and esoteric practitioner. As an associate of Walter Ernest Butler, she succeeded him as Director of Studies of the Servants of the Light.

== Early life ==
Dolores Ashcroft-Nowicki was born on 11 June 1929 in Jersey, where she was also raised. Her grandmother was Romani, and she grew up in a family tradition dedicated to the occult sciences. During World War II she left with her family to live on the Wirral Peninsula in the northwest of England. She spent her spare time visiting the Roma who used to camp there. There, she learned about the natural world, tarot cards and fortune telling. After the war, the family returned to Jersey and her parents formed a clandestine occult discussion group due to restrictions imposed by Jersey's law.

== Occult career ==
During the 1960s, Ashcroft-Nowicki entered the Society of the Inner Light, an esoteric order founded by occultist Dion Fortune. There she became associated with Walter Ernest Butler, and with Gareth Knight and the Helios Course in Practical Qabalah, which in 1971 became the foundation of Servants of the Light. In 1976, when Butler retired, Ashcroft-Nowicki became the Director of Studies of the SOL, a position she handed on in June 2018 to Steven Critchley.

== Personal life and death ==
Ashcroft-Nowicki went to London to study at the Royal Academy of Dramatic Art; later she studied Opera at Trinity College of Music in Cambridge. She briefly interrupted her studies to get married, but divorced three years later. She then returned to her studies and completed them.

She was also very interested in fencing and represented the islands against France and England in competition. She won several cups and trophies and met her future husband Michael Nowicki at a fencing club. They married in 1957 and have two children, Tamara and Carl. The family moved back to the Channel Island of Jersey, off the coast of France.

Nowicki died on 8 January 2026, at the age of 96.

== Published works ==
To date, Ashcroft-Nowicki has written several books and designed two tarot decks, the SOL Tarot Deck with Jo Gill and Anthony Clark, and the Shakespearean Tarot with Paul Hardy.

- Ashcroft-Nowicki, Dolores (1986). The ritual magic workbook: a practical course of self-initiation. Wellingborough: Aquarian. ISBN 978-0-85030-467-1.
- Ashcroft-Nowicki, Dolores (2006). Your Unseen Power: Real Training in Western Magic. Sounds True. ISBN 978-1591794783.
- Ashcroft-Nowicki, Dolores (1999). The tree of ecstasy: an advanced manual of sexual magic. York Beach, Maine: Samuel Weiser. ISBN 978-1-57863-038-7.
- An Anthology of Occult Wisdom
- Daughters of Eve: The Magical Mysteries of Womanhood
- First Steps in Ritual
- Highways of the Mind: The Art and History of Pathworking
- Illuminations: The Healing of the Soul
- Inner Landscapes: A Journey into Awareness by Pathworking
- Magical Use of Thought Forms
- Shadows and Light
- The Door Unlocked
- The Initiate's Book of Pathworking
- The Sacred Cord Meditations
- The Servants of the Light Tarot
- The Shining Paths
- The Singing Stones
- The New Book of the Dead
