= Margaret Lumley Brown =

English writer and occult figure (1886–1975)

Margaret Lumley Brown (b. 7 December 1886, d. 27 November 1975) was an English writer and occult figure of the 20th century.

== Early life ==
Lumley Brown was born in Long Stratton, Norfolk. She had a sister Isobel.

== Work ==
She took over the leadership of the Society of the Inner Light upon the death of Dion Fortune. She assisted Dion Fortune in writing The Arthurian Formula, which is considered to be an extremely influential work to the Society of the Inner Light.

She also wrote poetry using the pen-name Irene Hay. Prior to joining the Society of the Inner Light, Margaret Lumley Brown wrote Both Sides of the Door, which is said to have been based on her own life experiences with the supernatural in 1913, and which was published in 1918. The book piqued the interest of Arthur Conan Doyle, and the two conversed about it and its subject matter and dedicated Both Sides of the Door to her sister.

In addition to being a writer, Margaret Lumley Brown was a psychic, who began with the art of crystal gazing, but with practice was able to hone her abilities, and was eventually granted the title of Arch-Pythoness of the Society of the Inner Light, as well as being known as a "Cosmic Medium". She first joined the Society of the Inner Light between 1934 and 1943, and remained a member until her death in 1975 in London.
