= Aslacton Parish Land =

UK Site of Special Scientific Interest

Coordinates: 52.481°N 1.174°E

- Site of Special Scientific Interest
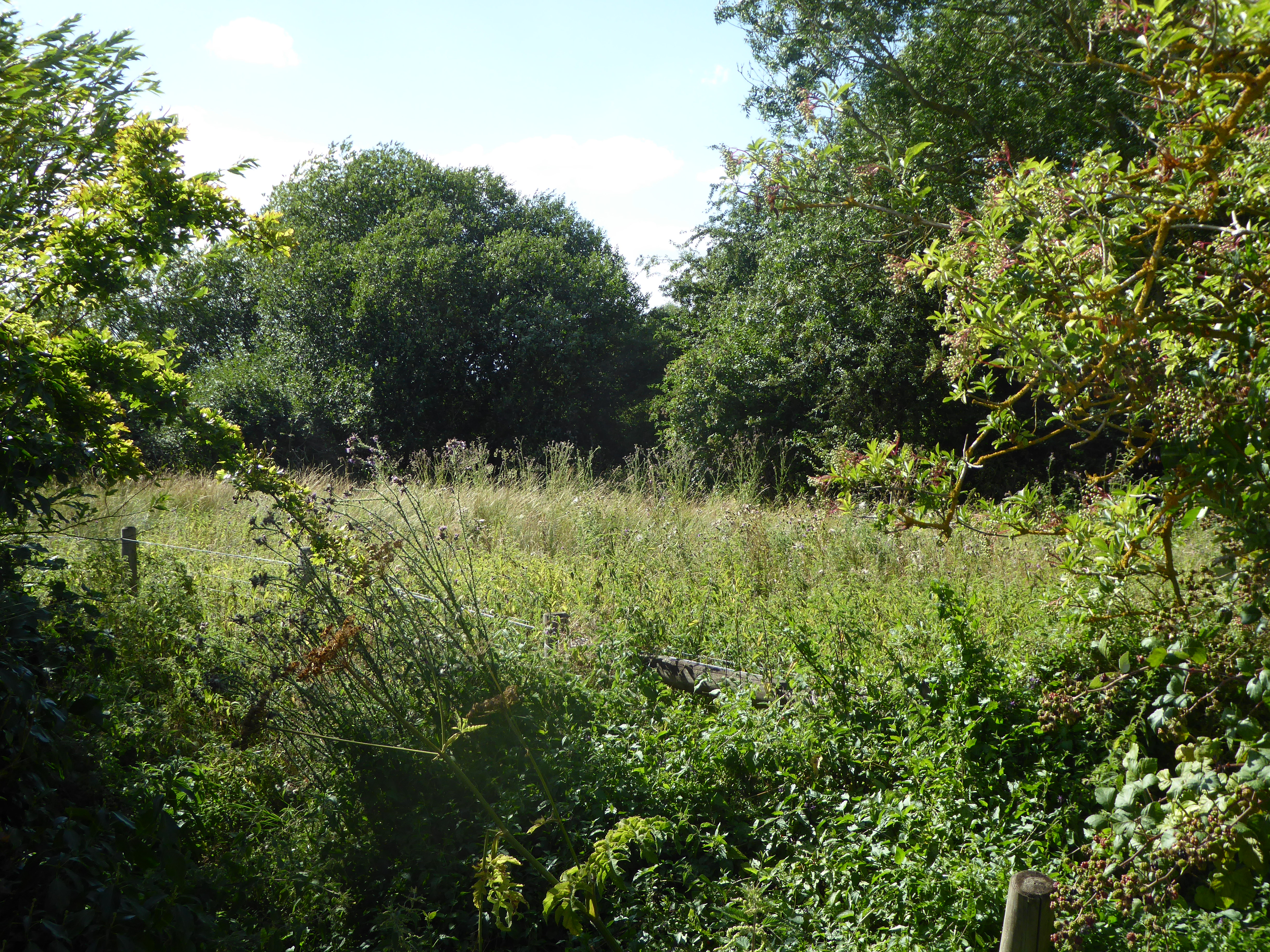
- Location of Aslacton Parish Land.
- Area of search: Norfolk, England
- Grid reference: TM 156 917
- Interest: Biological
- Area: 4.4 hectares (11 acres)
- Notification date: 1985
- Location map: Magic Map

Aslacton Parish Land is a 4.4-hectare (11-acre) biological Site of Special Scientific Interest west of Long Stratton in Norfolk, England.

This site has wet and dry unimproved meadows with a rich flora. Uncommon species include marsh arrowgrass, yellow rattle, fragrant orchid, common butterwort and adder's tongue. Snipe often breed there.

The site is private land with no public access.

== Land ownership ==
All land within Aslacton Parish Land SSSI is owned by the local authority
