= Charles Henville Bayly =

English priest and cricketer

Charles Henville Bayly (13 March 1807 – 25 January 1873) was an English cricketer with amateur status. He was born in Winchester, Hampshire, and educated at Winchester College and New College, Oxford. He played for Oxford University from 1827 to 1832. He was made a fellow of New College in 1838. He became a Church of England priest and was rector of Stratton St Michael, Norfolk, from 1839 until his death there in 1873.

== Bibliography ==
- Haygarth, Arthur (1996) [1862]. Scores & Biographies, Volume 1 (1744–1826). Kennington: Frederick Lillywhite. ISBN 978-19-00592-23-9.
- Haygarth, Arthur (1997) [1862]. Scores & Biographies, Volume 2 (1827–1840). Kennington: Frederick Lillywhite. ISBN 978-19-00592-23-9.
