= W. E. Butler =

British occultist and writer (1898–1978)

Walter Ernest Butler (23 August 1898 – 1 August 1978) was a working occultist, writer, and the founder and first director of Servants of the Light in Britain.

== Early life ==
His first training in the mysteries was with Robert King, a bishop in the Liberal Catholic Church, who trained him as a medium. Butler later became a priest in the Liberal Catholic Church.

While in India, he studied with Indian mystics and also came into contact with Theosophist mystic Annie Besant, who politely rejected his requests to study with her. He returned to England and joined Dion Fortune's Society of the Inner Light in 1925, where he continued to train and participate until sometime toward the end of World War II.

== Career ==
In 1962 he met Gareth Knight and, with Knight, began to develop a correspondence course in Qabalah for Helios Books. During this time he also rejoined the Society of the Inner Light, where he met Michael Nowicki and Dolores Ashcroft-Nowicki. By 1973, the Helios Course in the Practical Qabalah had gained popularity and was spun off to form the Servants of the Light, for which Ernest was the first Director of Studies. He remained director of studies until shortly before his death, when he passed that responsibility to Dolores Ashcroft-Nowicki.

== Personality and personal life ==
W. E. Butler worked many years as an engineer. Later on he was a member of the technical staff at University of Southampton, England. By the 1970s, Butler was living in a Tudor cottage with limestone walls and a thatched roof, Little Thatches, which was located in Hillstreet, Calmore, Southampton . Janine Chapman met Butler in the 1970s, noting that he had a Yorkshire accent, and commenting on a "paternal sort of goodness about him". She moreover highlighted that he had "the very pale white skin of a Celt, a round face, thin lips, and a kindly smile."

I first met Mr Butler at a meeting of the Society of the inner Light at Steeles Road in the mid 60's. We were taking tea when I noticed this odd looking character over in the corner and I went over and introduced myself. He was wearing a trilby hat (indoors) and a dog collar so that, at first, I thought he was a vicar. He was quite hard of hearing at this time and had an analogue hearing aid consisting of a long wire and a box that clipped on to his lapel. Later, when he pulled out his wallet to give me a card with his address, some bits fell to the floor and when I picked them up for him I spotted a red card and he said "Ah yes, the old complaint." He was a card carrying diabetic. He had a good sense of humour and told me that he liked to take the mickey out of people - particularly the Irish. I intimated that I didn't think that this was the greatest idea at the time.

== Bibliography ==
- Magic: Its Ritual, Power and Purpose, 1952
- The Magician: His Training and Work, 1959
- Apprenticed to Magic, 1962
- Magic and the Qabalah, 1964
- How to Develop Clairvoyance, 1968
- How to Read the Aura, 1971
- How to Develop Psychometry, 1971
- How to Develop Telepathy, 1975
- Practical Magic and the Western Mystery Tradition, 1986
- Lords of Light: The Path of Initiation in the Western Mysteries, 1990

== Sources ==
=== Sources ===
- Barrett, David V. (2011). A Brief Guide to Secret Religions: A Complete Guide to Hermetic, Pagan and Esoteric Beliefs. London: Constable & Robinson. ISBN 978-1849015950.
- Chapman, Janine (1993). Quest for Dion Fortune. York Beach, Maine: Samuel Weiser. ISBN 978-0877287759.
- Knight, Gareth (2002). Servants of the Light biography of W. E. Butler Archived 8 June 2007 at the Wayback Machine. Retrieved 30 September 2004.
