= Wacton, Norfolk =

Village in Norfolk, England

Coordinates: 52.47786°N 1.20870°E

Wacton
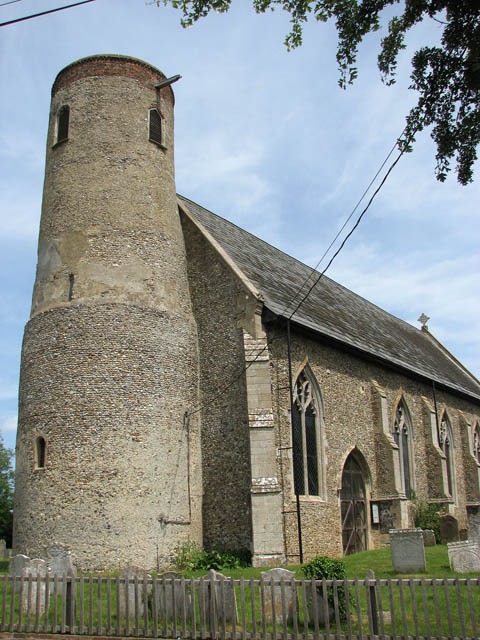
- All Saints Church

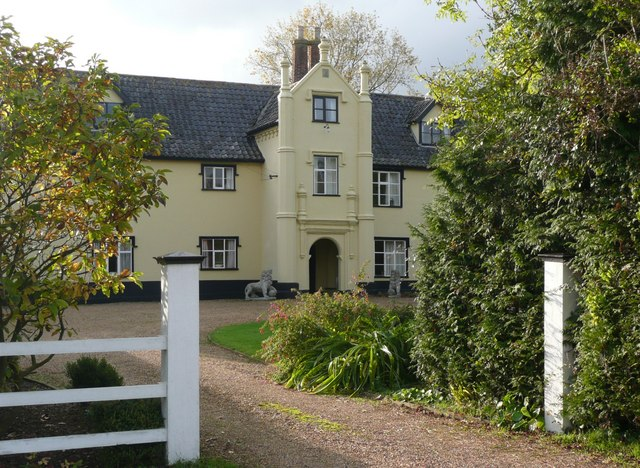
- Wacton Hall

- Location within Norfolk
- Area: 4.54 km^{2} (1.75 sq mi)
- Population: 302 (2011)
  - Density: 67/km^{2} (170/sq mi)
- OS grid reference: TM180915
- Civil parish: Wacton
- District: South Norfolk
- Shire county: Norfolk
- Region: East
- Country: England
- Sovereign state: United Kingdom
- Post town: NORWICH
- Postcode district: NR15
- Dialling code: 01508
- Police: Norfolk
- Fire: Norfolk
- Ambulance: East of England
- Website: wactonvillagehall.co.uk

Wacton is a hamlet in the English county of Norfolk, located approximately one mile south-west of Long Stratton and 13 miles (21 km) south-west of Norwich. It covers an area of 4.54 km^{2} (1.75 sq mi) and had a population of 343 as recorded in the 2021 census.

One of Wacton's most notable features is the round-tower church of All Saints.

== History ==
The hamlet's name means "Waca's farm/settlement".

In John Marius Wilson's Imperial Gazetteer of England and Wales (1870–72), Wacton, Norfolk (which at the time consisted of two parishes) was described as follows:

"WACTON-MAGNA and W.-Parva, two parishes in Depwade district, Norfolk; 1 mile ESE of Forcett r. station, and 1½ SW of Long Stratton-Post town, Long Stratton. Acres, 1,044. Real property, £1,981. Pop., 244. Houses, 54. The property is much subdivided. The livings are conjoint rectories in the diocese of Norwich. Value, £302. Patron, the Rev.Grain. The church was recently restored."

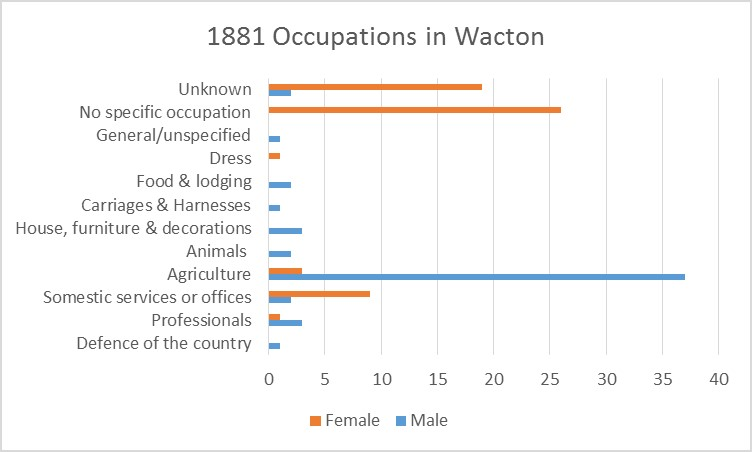
A graph showing the occupations of Wactons residents in 1881.

In 1881, Wacton's residents had a far narrower range of occupations compared to 2011. The vast majority of working males in the village were employed in agriculture (37), while the numbers in other occupations were significantly lower. The next most common occupations for men were in "House, Furniture & Decoration" (3) and "Professionals" (also 3).

A large proportion of females were recorded as having "No Specified Occupation" (37), while a further 19 were categorised as having an "Unknown" occupation. Beyond these two categories, the next most frequent occupation for women was in "Domestic Services & Offices".

The hamlet has a long history dating back to prehistoric times. Evidence of this was uncovered during field walks conducted between 1978 and 1980, during which boiling pots and flints were discovered, along with artefacts from other historical periods.

However, there was little significant evidence from the preceding Bronze and Iron Ages within the parish. The only finds from the Bronze Age were flint tools from its earlier phase and socketed spearheads from its later period. For the Iron Age, the sole discoveries were silver coins and pottery shards.

There was also a strong Roman presence in Wacton during this period. A major road, known as Pye Road, passed through the village, connecting Scole to the Roman town of Venta Icenorum at Caistor St Edmund.

Notable Roman artefacts discovered in Wacton include a gold coin found in a garden on Wash Lane in 1998. Evidence also suggests that Barbarous Radiate coins were likely manufactured in the southern part of Wacton.

There is a gap in Wacton's history, with few historical finds from the Saxon period. However, the subsequent medieval period was the richest in terms of historical significance for the village. During this time, the still-standing All Saints Church was constructed, along with St Mary’s Church, which no longer exists.

St Mary’s Church later became a chapel in 1500 but fell into disuse between 1510 and 1522, after which it was repurposed as a dovecote. Other less significant artefacts from the medieval period include a cowbell discovered in 1979, a coin weight, and a silver strap fitting.

In more recent history, the Eastern Union Railway ran through Wacton, providing a connection to London from the mid-19th century until its closure in 1966. While there was no station in Wacton itself, villagers could access the railway at the nearby station in Forncett.

== All Saints Church ==
The round-tower church is Wacton's most prominent and recognisable landmark. The structure consists of two main segments: the tower and the main body. The lower stage of the tower is believed to be Saxon in origin. The church is thought to have been constructed in the 12th century, with alterations made in subsequent centuries, including the replacement of doors and windows.

All Saints Church, along with several other buildings in Wacton, holds protected status.

== Demographics ==
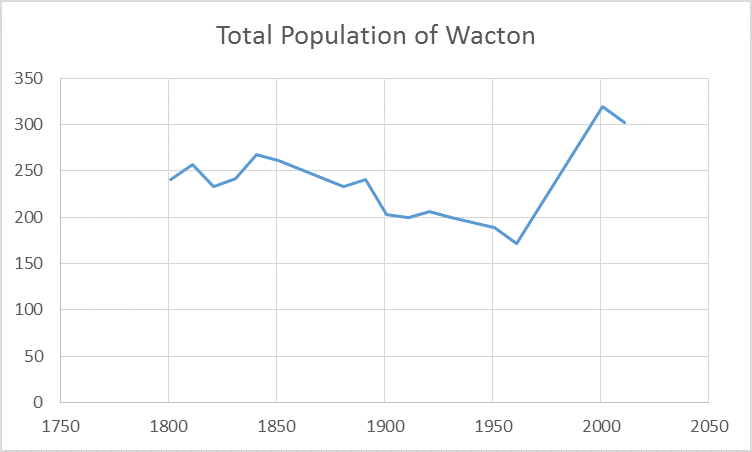
Wacton's total population 1801–2011

The graph above illustrates the population of Wacton from 1801 to 2011. Following a period of relatively stable gains and losses from 1801 through the early 1890s, Wacton’s population declined by nearly 30% between 1895 and 1961, reaching a low of 172.

The population then rebounded, growing by 85% between 1961 and 2001, when it peaked at 319. Before 1961, despite occasional periods of growth, the population was in gradual decline. The population decreased again between 2001 and 2011, when it was recorded at 302. By the 2021 census, it had risen to 343.

The current population of Wacton is relatively older, with 59.3% of residents aged 45 or over. The largest age group is 45–59, which accounts for 28.1% of the total population. The percentage of Wacton's residents under 18 is just 17.9%.

The ethnic composition of Wacton is overwhelmingly White British, with 94.4% of the population belonging to this group. The remaining 5.6% comprises various other ethnic groups, with the only group other than White British having more than two residents being the White/Asian mixed group, which has five residents.

The socio-economic classification of many of Wacton's residents could be considered middle class, given that the most common occupations are "Professional Occupations" (31 residents) and "Associate Professional and Technical Occupations" (26). Other notable careers among Wacton residents include "Skilled Trade Occupations" (24), "Administrative and Secretarial Occupations" (19), and "Managers, Directors, and Senior Official Occupations" (18).
