= Persuasions of the Witch's Craft =

1989 book by Tanya Luhrmann

- The first edition cover of the book
- Author: Tanya Luhrmann
- Language: English
- Subject: Anthropology of religion Pagan studies
- Publisher: Harvard University Press
- Publication date: 1989
- Publication place: United States
- Media type: Print (Hardcover & Paperback)
- Pages: 382

Persuasions of the Witches' Craft: Ritual Magic in Contemporary England is a study of several Wiccan and ceremonial magic groups that assembled in southern England during the 1980s. It was written by the American anthropologist Tanya M. Luhrmann of the University of California, San Diego, and first published in 1989.

== Influence ==
Writing in her paper within James R. Lewis' edited Magical Religion and Modern Witchcraft anthology, Siân Reid described Luhrmann's work as "a solid ethnography". Nevertheless, she felt that the study "occasionally rings hollow" because Luhrmann failed to take into account the "subjective motivations for magical practice". In her anthropological study of the U.S. Pagan community, Witching Culture (2004), the American academic Sabina Magliocco noted that her work both built upon and departed from Luhrmann's.

== Interpretive Drift ==
One of the key concepts developed by Luhrmann is that of "Interpretive Drift, the gradual shift in a person's interpretation of events and experiences so that, over time, the person comes to understand these experiences in terms of a new belief system or framework. Although it is rare for people to change their deeply held beliefs overnight, as they have new experiences their beliefs shift incrementally, leading them to adopt beliefs and practices that they might have previously considered strange. Although Luhrmann studied interpretive drift in the setting of modern witchcraft, it is a very general concept, and probably plays a role in almost every setting, most especially where someone is joining a new community, like that of religions, sciences, or any other kind of community or culture.

The concept of shifting beliefs and interpretations is similar to concepts described in other settings, such as Thomas Kuhn's "Paradigm Shifts", Peter L. Berger and Thomas Luckmann's "Social Construction of Reality", Leon Festinger's "Cognitive Dissonance Theory", "Symbolic Interactionism", and non-stage-based developmental theories, such as the "Overlapping Wave Theory", due to Robert S. Siegler.

Although the interpretive drift was intended to describe a feature of human cognition, it has parallels in Artificial Intelligence, especially regarding how machine learning (ML) models adapt slowly with experience, and specifically "Concept Drift" which shares with interpretive drift the core idea of gradual change over time, and the processes by which a starting point or understanding evolves due to new influences. ML models are trained on a specific set of data, and if the real-world data (on which predictions are made) begins to drift from the training data's distribution, the model's performance can degrade.
