= Tanya Luhrmann =

American anthropologist (born 1959)

- Born: 1959 (age 66–67)
- Education: Radcliffe College (BA); Emmanuel College, Cambridge (MPhil, PhD)
- Spouse: Richard Saller
- Awards: American Anthropological Association President's Award (2004); Lewis Henry Morgan Lecture (2006); Guggenheim Fellowship (2007)
- Scientific career
- Fields: Psychological anthropology
- Workplaces: Stanford University; University of California, San Diego; University of Chicago
- Doctoral advisor: Jack Goody; Ernest Gellner
- Website: tanyaluhrmann.com

Tanya Marie Luhrmann (born 1959) is an American psychological anthropologist known for her studies of modern witches, charismatic Christians, and how culture shapes psychotic, dissociative, and related experiences. She has also studied culture and morality, and the training of psychiatrists. She is Albert Ray Lang Professor in Anthropology at Stanford University. Luhrmann was elected to the American Philosophical Society in 2022.

== Education and career ==
Luhrmann received her A.B. in folklore and mythology from Radcliffe College in 1981, working with Stanley Tambiah. She then studied social anthropology at Cambridge University, working with Jack Goody and Ernest Gellner. In 1986 she received her PhD for work on modern-day witches in England, later published as Persuasions of the Witch's Craft (1989). In this book, she described the ways in which magic and other esoteric techniques both serve emotional needs and come to seem reasonable through the experience of practice.

Her second research project looked at the situation of contemporary Parsis, a Zoroastrian community in India. The Parsi community enjoyed a privileged position under the British Raj; although by many standards, Parsis continued to do well economically in post-colonial India, they have become politically marginal in comparison to their previous position. During Luhrmann's fieldwork in the 1990s, many Parsis spoke pessimistically about the future of their community. Luhrmann's book The Good Parsi (1996) explored the contradictions inherent in the social psychology of a post-colonial elite.

Her third book explored the contradictions and tensions between two models of psychiatry, the psychodynamic (psychoanalytic) and the biomedical, through ethnographic study of the training of American psychiatry residents during the health care transition of the early 1990s. Of Two Minds (2000) received several awards, including the Victor Turner Prize for Ethnographic Writing from the Society for Humanistic Anthropology and the Boyer Prize for Contributions to Psychoanalytic Anthropology from the Society for Psychological Anthropology in 2001.

Her fourth book, When God Talks Back: Understanding the American Evangelical Relationship with God (2012), examines the growing movement of evangelical and charismatic Christianity, and specifically how practitioners come to experience God as someone with whom they can communicate on a daily basis through prayer and visualization. It was the focus of a book review symposium in Religion, Brain & Behavior.

Her other projects include a National Institute of Mental Health-funded study of how chronic or periodic homelessness contributes to the experience and morbidity of schizophrenia.

Tanya Luhrmann was a faculty member in anthropology at the University of California, San Diego, from 1989 to 2000. From 2000 to 2007, she was Max Palevsky Professor of Comparative Human Development at the University of Chicago, where she was also a director of the program in clinical ethnography. Since 2007, she has been a professor of anthropology at Stanford University.

She was elected a fellow of the American Academy of Arts and Sciences in 2003 and president of the Society for Psychological Anthropology for 2007–2009. She received the American Anthropological Association's President's Award for 2004 and a 2007 Guggenheim Fellowship. In 2006, Luhrmann delivered the Lewis Henry Morgan Lecture at the University of Rochester. She received the J.I. Staley Prize from the School for Advanced Research in 2024 for her book How God Becomes Real.

== Personal life ==
Tanya Luhrmann was raised in New Jersey. She has two sisters, including children's book author Anna Dewdney.

Luhrmann is married to Richard Saller, another professor at Stanford University who was also its twelfth president.

== Selected publications ==
=== Books ===
- Persuasions of the Witch’s Craft: Ritual Magic in Contemporary England. Harvard University Press. 1989.
- The Good Parsi: The Postcolonial Anxieties of an Indian Colonial Elite. Harvard University Press. 1996.
- Of Two Minds: The Growing Disorder in American Psychiatry. New York: Alfred A. Knopf. 2000.
- When God Talks Back: Understanding the American Evangelical Relationship with God. New York: Alfred A. Knopf. 2012.
- Our Most Troubling Madness: Case Studies in Schizophrenia Across Cultures. Co-edited with Jocelyn Marrow. University of California Press. 2016.
- How God Becomes Real: Kindling the Presence of Invisible Others. Princeton University Press. 2020.

=== Articles ===
- "Metakinesis: How God Becomes Intimate in Contemporary U.S. Christianity". American Anthropologist. 106 (3). September 2004.
- "The Anthropology of Mind: Exploring Unusual Sensations and Spiritual Experiences Across Cultures" (PDF). ALIUS Bulletin. 1. Interviewed by Martin Fortier. 2017.
