= Pagan studies =

Field of study

Pagan studies is the multidisciplinary academic field devoted to the study of modern paganism, a broad assortment of modern religious movements, which are typically influenced by or claiming to be derived from the various pagan beliefs of premodern Europe. Pagan studies embraces a variety of different scholarly approaches to studying such religions, drawing from history, sociology, anthropology, archaeology, folkloristics, theology and other religious studies.

== Background ==
The earliest academic studies of contemporary paganism were published between 1970 and 1980 by scholars like Margot Adler, Marcello Truzzi and Tanya Luhrmann, although it would not be until the 1990s that the actual pagan studies discipline properly developed, pioneered by academics such as Graham Harvey and Chas S. Clifton. Increasing academic interest in Paganism has been attributed to the new religious movement's increasing public visibility, as it began interacting with the interfaith movement and holding large public celebrations at sites such as Stonehenge.

The first academic conference on the subject was held at the University of Newcastle upon Tyne, North-East England in 1993, followed three years later by a larger conference organised by the University of Lancaster in North-West England. Annual gatherings of the Conference on Current Pagan Studies and the Contemporary Pagan Studies Unit of the American Academy of Religion continue to develop scholarship in this field. In 2004, a peer-reviewed academic journal devoted to the discipline, The Pomegranate, began publication. Many books on the subject have been published by a variety of different academic publishing companies, while AltaMira Press began publication of the Pagan Studies Series.

The relationship between pagan studies scholars and the contemporary pagan community which it studies has at times been strained, with some practitioners rejecting academic interpretations of their faiths. At the same time, many academics involved in Pagan studies are practicing pagans themselves, bringing an insider's perspective to their approaches.

== Development ==
=== Purpose ===
"Pagan studies, as a subdivision of the larger study of religions, exists, I have no doubt, because scholars of contemporary Paganism (many of them practitioners themselves) found and continue to find themselves not completely at home in such categories as "new religious movements" or "feminist religion." "

— Chas S. Clifton, 2004.

Pagan studies scholar Chas S. Clifton argued that the discipline had developed as a result of the increasing "academic acknowledgement" of contemporary Paganism's "movement into the public eye", referring to the emergence of pagan involvement with interfaith groups and the pagan use of archaeological monuments as "sacred sites", particularly in the United Kingdom. Clifton also argued that the development of Pagan studies was necessary to "set forth an audacious redefinition of the term "pagan" as Michael York has done", something which Clifton felt "gives us room to reexamine from fresh perspectives all manifestation of ancient Pagan religions".

=== Origins ===
The first international academic conference on the subject of Pagan studies was held at the University of Newcastle upon Tyne, North-East England in 1993. It had been organised by two British religious studies scholars, Harvey and Charlotte Hardman. In April 1996 a larger conference dealing with contemporary Paganism took place at Ambleside in the Lake District, organised by the Department of Religious Studies at the University of Lancaster, North-West England. Titled "Nature Religion Today: Western Paganism, Shamanism and Esotericism in the 1990s", it led to the publication of an academic anthology, Nature Religion Today: Paganism in the Modern World. In that anthology, some of the conference's organisers described its original intentions, remarking that through it they "sought to explore the innovations in practice and belief which constitute contemporary Paganism, and which appear to be a part of a widespread cultural response to the decay of main-line religions and to a widely felt awareness of ecological crisis."

That same year saw the beginnings of The Pomegranate, which would later be transformed into a peer-reviewed academic journal, which first appeared in 2004.

One of the books AltaMira released was Researching Paganisms, an anthology edited by Jenny Blain, Douglas Ezzy and Harvey in which different Pagan studies scholars discussed their involvement with the subject and the opposition that they have faced.

Ethan Doyle White noted that as Pagan studies reached its twentieth year, it came under "increasing pressure to explain itself, both to academia and to the Pagan community that it studies."

== Approaches ==
=== Sociological ===
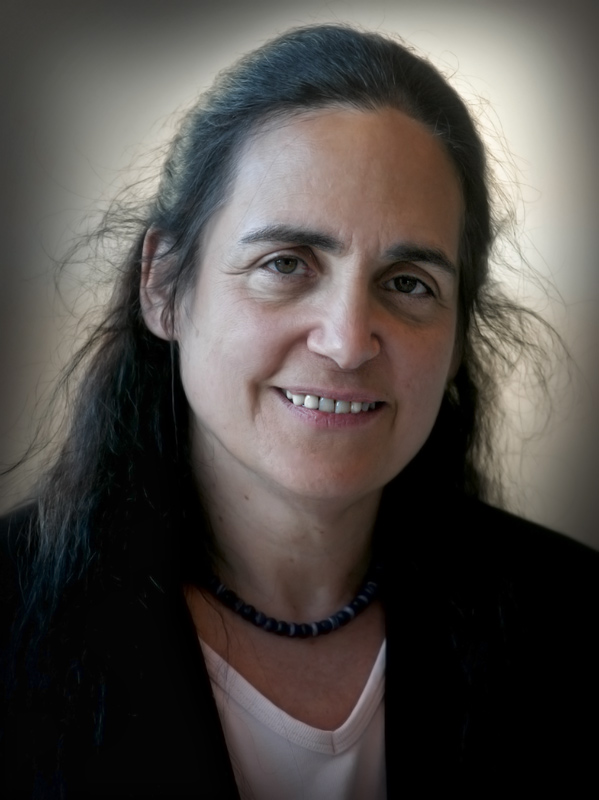
Margot Adler (pictured in 2004) published an early sociological study of Paganism in the United States.

In 1979, the American sociologist, journalist, and Wiccan Margot Adler published Drawing Down the Moon, a sociological study of the Pagan movement across the United States, covering Wiccans, Druids, Goddess Worshipers, Heathens, and Radical Faeries. She would update this book in 1986, 1996, and finally 2006, shortly before her death.

In 1999, the American sociologist Helen A. Berger of West Chester University published A Community of Witches, a sociological study of the Wiccan and Pagan movement in the north-eastern United States.

=== Religious studies ===
In 2003, the British religious studies scholar Michael York published Pagan Theology: Paganism as a World Religion, in which he argued that contemporary Paganism could be seen as a part of a much wider global "paganism" which encompassed a large variety of animistic and polytheistic religious traditions, including Indigenous religions. In 2005, ABC-CLIO published an anthology entitled Modern Paganism in World Cultures, which was edited by the American religious studies scholar Michael F. Strmiska.

=== Historical ===
Among the first scholars to study contemporary paganism from a historical perspective was the American Wiccan Aidan Kelly, who had been a founding member of the New Reformed Orthodox Order of the Golden Dawn and the Covenant of the Goddess during the 1970s. Having attained several academic qualifications, including in the field of religious studies, in the 1970s he began a study of the religious texts of Gardnerian Wicca, in order to establish a historical chronology for the tradition. The results of his study would only be published in 1991, as Crafting the Art of Magic. This would later be rewritten and republished in 2007 as Inventing Witchcraft.

The prominent English historian Ronald Hutton of the University of Bristol later devoted part of his book The Pagan Religions of the Ancient British Isles (1991) to an examination of the contemporary pagan religions that took these pre-Christian religions as a core influence. He followed this with several studies of British folk customs, but in 1999 returned to the field of Pagan studies when he published The Triumph of the Moon: A History of Modern Pagan Witchcraft, the first academic study of Wiccan history.

== Theoretical debates ==
Pagan studies has been charged with failing to properly define "paganism", as some scholars use it solely to designate contemporary Paganism and others – like Michael York and Chas Clifton – using it to refer to a wide range of religious movements across the world and throughout history. While some scholars have treated the term as a singular religion within which groups like Wicca and Heathenry are denominations, others have instead treated it as a "group of comparative religions". A further problem arises from the fact that while Pagan studies scholars might adopt "paganism" in reference to pre-Christian belief systems in Europe, the term was increasingly rejected by archaeologists specialising in those belief systems. The concern has been made that Pagan studies scholars would be "at a loss to convey (to ourselves and to others), what it is that we are actually studying. The current situation, in which widely differing definitions are being used in tandem, is clearly unsustainable."

The religious studies scholar Markus Altena Davidsen published a critique of the field in 2012, via a review of the Handbook of Contemporary Paganism. He argued that Pagan studies was dominated by an essentialist and normative view of its subject rather than a naturalist and theoretically oriented approach. Ethan Doyle White in The Pomegranate, argued that there were flaws in Davidsen's approach. Arguing that the Handbook of Contemporary Paganism was not as symptomatic of the field as Davidsen had assumed, he went on to identify a number of factual errors within Davidsen's paper. Doyle White argued that Davidsen's division of scholars into firmly insider and outsider categories was problematic as scholars of Pagan studies like Sabina Magliocco straddled both boundaries, an approach based in the methodologies employed in anthropology. In 2016, Doyle White offered his own critique of the field. He addressed the various definitions of "contemporary paganism", the need for a clearer definition of Pagan studies, and the relationship between Pagan studies and pagan activism, arguing for a reform of the field.

== Relationship with Pagan community ==
The relationship between Pagan studies scholars and some practicing pagans has at times been strained. The Australian academic and practicing pagan Caroline Jane Tully argued that as a result of cognitive dissonance, many pagans can react negatively to new scholarship regarding historical pre-Christian societies, believing that it is a threat to the structure of their beliefs and "sense of identity." She furthermore argued that some of those dissatisfied Pagans lashed out against academics as a result, particularly on the internet.

== See also ==
- Modern Paganism
- New religious movement
- Religious studies
