= Pagan Theology =

2003 book by Michael York

Pagan Theology: Paganism as a World Religion
- The cover of the book, a photograph of a megalith taken by York
- Author: Michael York
- Language: English
- Subject: Religious studies Pagan studies
- Publisher: New York University Press
- Publication date: 1 April 2003
- Publication place: United States
- Media type: Print (Hardcover and paperback)
- ISBN: 978-0-8147-9702-0

Pagan Theology: Paganism as a World Religion is a taxonomical study of various world religions which argues for a new definition of the word "paganism". It was written by American religious studies scholar Michael York of Bath Spa University and first published by New York University Press in 1 April 2003.

In Pagan Theology, York presents his controversial theory that the term "paganism", originally a pejorative term to refer to non-Christian religions, should instead be used by scholars to refer specifically to those religious movements who share the common characteristics of polytheism, animism and life-affirming beliefs. Under this category of "paganism", York therefore includes the extinct historical faiths of pre-Christian Europe, living indigenous religions, several modern religions like Shinto and Hinduism, and the new religious movements of contemporary paganism. Furthermore, York argues that this "paganism" was the "root religion" of humanity, from which later monotheistic religions like Judaism, Christianity and Islam developed.

Academic reviews of York's book were mixed, with reviewers making note of the ambitious nature of Pagan Theology, but some believing that it failed to present an entirely convincing argument. As a result of this, not all of them agreed with York's proposed categories, citing various reasons why they believed that it should not be employed. In the wider field of Pagan studies it has been criticised, most notably by Michael F. Strmiska, who argued that it contributed to the cultural oppression of indigenous peoples.

== Background ==
At the time of writing, York was a self-proclaimed "pagan practitioner" as well as a religious studies academic. Commenting on his own personal religious and spiritual beliefs, York related that:

If I had to name my own denominational predilection, I would say that I am a "religionist." I believe in religion itself and its central role in expanding human consciousness above and beyond immediate daily concerns. I see religion as an ongoing dialogue that questions the purpose of life and our terrestrial incarnations. In my own pursuit and love of religion as religion, I have been particularly attracted to paganism not only as the source and origin of all religion but also as an organic alternative to the institutionalized and parochial insularity that much religious expression has become.

== Synopsis ==
In his introduction, York explains his approach to religion, which he chooses to define as "a shared apprehension of the world, humanity, and the supernatural and their interrelation". He proceeds to use a map as a metaphor for religion, noting that both help the individual to navigate their own way through the world. Exclaiming that paganism should be seen as a religion in itself, he criticises earlier religious studies scholars for failing to devote time to a discussion of this term, whose etymology he then explains.

In the next chapter, entitled "Paganism as Religion", York argues that religious studies scholars should not use "paganism" in reference purely to pre-Christian religions in Europe or Neopaganism, but expand it to refer to a far wider group of animistic, polytheistic beliefs across the world. Putting together a list of five criteria that believes can be used to define "paganism", he then explores a series of seven different religious groups or beliefs and explains how they fit into this category of his: Chinese Folk Religion, Shinto, Primal Tribal Religions, shamanism, American Indian Spirituality, Afro-American Spiritism, and Contemporary Western Paganism.

== Arguments ==
=== Redefining "paganism" ===
In Pagan Theology, York exclaims that his purpose is to "expand the concept of paganism." Noting that the term had been originally employed by the early Christians of the Roman Empire to describe adherents of non-Jewish religions, he notes that the pre-Christian and pre-Islamic beliefs of Europe that this initial description covered are similar to other Indigenous religions across the world, and so should also be considered to be "pagan". As such, York argues that religious studies scholars should define "paganism" as a religion utilising five specific criteria, all of which were exhibited in the pre-Christian religions of Europe:

"[P]aganism includes (1) a number of both male and female gods, (2) magical practice, (3) emphasis on ritual efficacy, (4) corpospirituality, and (5) an understanding of gods and humans as codependent and related."

York argues that many of the world's religious movements fit these criteria and should therefore be labelled "pagan". This includes the original pre-Christian religions of Europe, and the Contemporary Pagan, or Neopagan religions inspired by them. To this he adds indigenous religions from North America, Australia and Africa, as well as the religions of the African diaspora such as Vodou and Santeria. He furthermore includes two east Asian faiths, Chinese traditional religion and Japanese Shinto, as well as any practices involving shamanism.

Utilising the figures for global religious adherence that were published by David Barrett in his World Christian Encyclopedia (1982), York argues that by the year 2000, 6% of the world's population would be "pagan" under his definition of the term. According to his reckoning, this makes paganism one of the world's major religious blocs, alongside the "Christian-Islamic" bloc, the "nonreligious/atheist" bloc, the "Hindu-Buddhist" bloc, the "new religious" block and the "other" bloc, and that as such it should be defined as a world religion with global coverage.

== Reception and recognition ==
=== Academic reviews ===
"This is a highly complex and sometimes elusive book written, perhaps, more for scholars than for undergraduates. Its burden is more taxonomical than informative. Nonetheless, I have little doubt that it will reinvigorate not only the debate over the definition of religion but, perhaps more significantly, the debate over where one religion starts and another ends."

— Melissa Raphael, 2004.

In her review for the Journal for the Scientific Study of Religion, Melissa Raphael of the University of Gloucestershire argued that York's work "does well to remind us that the religious academy has for too long patronized, ignored or (inaccurately) consigned pagan religion and spirituality to the "odds and ends" bin of the New Age movement." Considering Pagan Theology to be a "dense and serious study", that was based upon York's "exceptionally well traveled" experiences, Raphael noted however that it was "not quite what I was expecting. The main title would have led me to believe that I had found a book on the divine in Western, earth-based neo-pagan religions. Pagan Theology is a good deal more ambitious than that". Raphael proceeded to argue that she was "disappointed" that the work "paid little attention to the inflections of gender", in particular considering the prominent role held by female deities in most of the pagan religions described in the book. She also felt some "disquiet" that the word "theology" was being used by York in reference to certain religious groups for whom "the philosophical and cultural freighting of both logos and theos are categorically and conceptually alien". Furthermore, she expressed concern over the fact that "many of the religions to which York ascribes paganism would disown it" whilst others would "deny that they share any common essence with other religions."

In her review for the Sociology of Religion journal, Mary Jo Neitz of the University of Missouri noted that she agreed with York that "paganism is a legitimate category of religion for both practitioners and for those of us who study religion." Nonetheless, she disagreed with his position of "establishing universal definitions of paganism as a world religion or an essential practice", arguing that in doing so he was "gloss[ing] over significant differences" between different religious groups by "universalizing" them under cover-all categories. On a more positive note, she felt that the book would be a useful text for those studying courses on world religions, aiding students in asking the question as to "what scholars mean by the category of world religion itself, and who is served by maintaining the traditional boundaries which establish those belief systems and practices that count as insider and those which must be cast outside."

"Pagan Theology will appeal to an international audience of scholars and practitioners of Paganism, similar to that of The Pomegranate, but should also be of interest to scholars of religion more broadly, since York examines paganism in a global context, and as it occurs within other world religions, as root religion."

— Barbara Jane Davy, 2004.

Writing in The Pomegranate: The International Journal of Pagan Studies, Barbara Jane Davy of Concordia University described Pagan Theology as being "Part travelogue, part theological argument, [and] part sociological study", providing a "tour through paganism's multiple forms in space and time." Believing that York had presented "a good argument" for using the term "paganism" to refer to a global "root religion", she noted however that "Some readers will sense a conflict between York's presentation of paganism as a world religion and as root religion. This perhaps derives from an ambiguity in his desires about paganism: for it to be a 'proper' religion, worthy of study, and a legitimate form of religious practice, but also to present it as distinctive, unlike all other religion, and as foundational to all religion." She also praised his use of the lower case "paganism" to refer to the global phenomenon, arguing that it "differentiates his subject matter from what is usually understood in Pagan studies as contemporary Paganism, Neopaganism, or sometimes modern or Western Paganism." Ultimately, she remarked that her "only complaint" was that she would have liked to have seen York "relate his understanding of paganism to Robert Redfield's understanding of folk practices in terms of "little traditions" as opposed to the institutionalized "great traditions" usually identified as "world religions," discussed in The Little Community and Peasant Society and Culture (1969)."

=== Reception in Pagan studies scholarship ===
==== Chas S. Clifton and The Pomegranate ====
Writing in volume 6.1 of The Pomegranate: The International Journal of Pagan Studies (2004), the journal's editor, Chas S. Clifton of Colorado State University–Pueblo, made reference to York's work in his discussion of the definition of Pagan studies. Clifton proceeded to argue that the development of Pagan studies was necessary to "set forth an audacious redefinition of the term "pagan" as Michael York has done", something which Clifton felt "gives us room to reexamine from fresh perspectives all manifestation of ancient Pagan religions".

==== Michael F. Strmiska ====
"Indigenous peoples share a common experience of immense devastation and suffering under colonialism and racism, a universe of suffering visited on them by Euro-American Caucasians; the same people who comprise the majority membership of such modern Pagan religious movements as Wicca or Asatru. Modern European-derived Paganism and Native American and other Indigenous religions of non-European origins involve similar elements, such as reverence for nature, polytheistic pantheons, and life- and body-affirming worldviews, but there are differences as well, stemming from their different cultural, linguistic, and historical backgrounds."

— Michael F. Strmiska, explaining his opposition to York's ideas, 2005.

Writing in the opening paper of his edited academic anthology Modern Paganism in World Cultures: Comparative Perspectives (2005), the American religious studies scholar Michael F. Strmiska, then working at Central Connecticut State University, commented on York's argument in Pagan Theology, noting that it was the same as that made by the political scientist and practicing Wiccan Gus DiZerega in his book Pagans and Christians: The Personal Spiritual Experience (2001).

Although considering such a theory to be "thought provoking", Strmiska ultimately rejected it because he felt that "blurring together the religious identities of these many different peoples, with their vastly different historical and contemporary situations, does a disservice to Indigenous peoples' struggles for postcolonial self-determination by conflating them with the very peoples they see as their oppressors and colonizers." Although accepting that "modern Euro-American Pagans" were often "sympathetic" to Indigenous peoples and "interested in learning aspects" of their "cultural and religious traditions", Strmiska noted that the "contemporary situations" between the two ethno-cultural groups was "quite different" and that this "brutal social reality and the immense historical, economic, and political realities that lie behind it cannot be bridged by a simple labelling process or ameliorated by a unilateral proclamation of spiritual unity between modern Pagans and Indigenous peoples."

Strmiska also felt that it was "worth observing the simple courtesy of calling people by the names they wish to be known by and not calling them by names they reject or are uncomfortable with. The designations Pagan and Paganism, let alone Neopagan or Neopaganism, are not the terms of choice that Native Americans or other Indigenous peoples usually apply to themselves and their religious traditions." He proceeded to argue that "[d]isagreements over terminology may seem petty or trivial, but they are not if we consider what is at stake for modern Pagans." In particular, he noted both the historical persecution of those labelled pagans and the continued "legal and political" oppression of modern Pagans.
