= Theology =

Study of the nature of deities and religious beliefs

Theology is the study of religious belief from a religious perspective, with a focus on the nature of divinity and the history behind religion. It is taught as an academic discipline, typically in universities and seminaries. It occupies itself with the unique content of analyzing the supernatural, but also deals with religious epistemology; moreover, it asks and seeks to answer the question of revelation, which pertains to the acceptance of deities, as not only transcendent or above the natural world, but also willing and able to interact with the natural world and to reveal themselves to humankind.

Theologians use various forms of analysis and argument (experiential, philosophical, ethnographic, historical, and others) to help understand, explain, test, critique, defend or promote any myriad of religious topics. As in philosophy of ethics and case law, arguments often assume the existence of previously resolved questions, and develop by making analogies from them to draw new inferences in new situations.

The study of theology may help a theologian more deeply understand their own religious tradition, another religious tradition, or it may enable them to explore the nature of divinity without reference to any specific tradition. Theology may be used to propagate, reform, or justify a religious tradition; or it may be used to compare, challenge (e.g. biblical criticism), or oppose (e.g. irreligion) a religious tradition or worldview. Theology might also help a theologian address some present situation or need through a religious tradition, or to explore possible ways of interpreting the world.

== Etymology ==
The term "theology" derives from the Greek theologia (θεολογία), a combination of theos (Θεός, 'god') and logia (λογία, 'utterances, sayings, oracles')—the latter word relating to Greek logos (λόγος, 'word, discourse, account, reasoning'). The term would pass on to Latin as theologia, then French as théologie, eventually becoming the English theology.

Through several variants (e.g., theologie, teologye), the English theology had evolved into its current form by 1362. The sense that the word has in English depends in large part on the sense that the Latin and Greek equivalents had acquired in patristic and medieval Christian usage although the English term has now spread beyond Christian contexts.

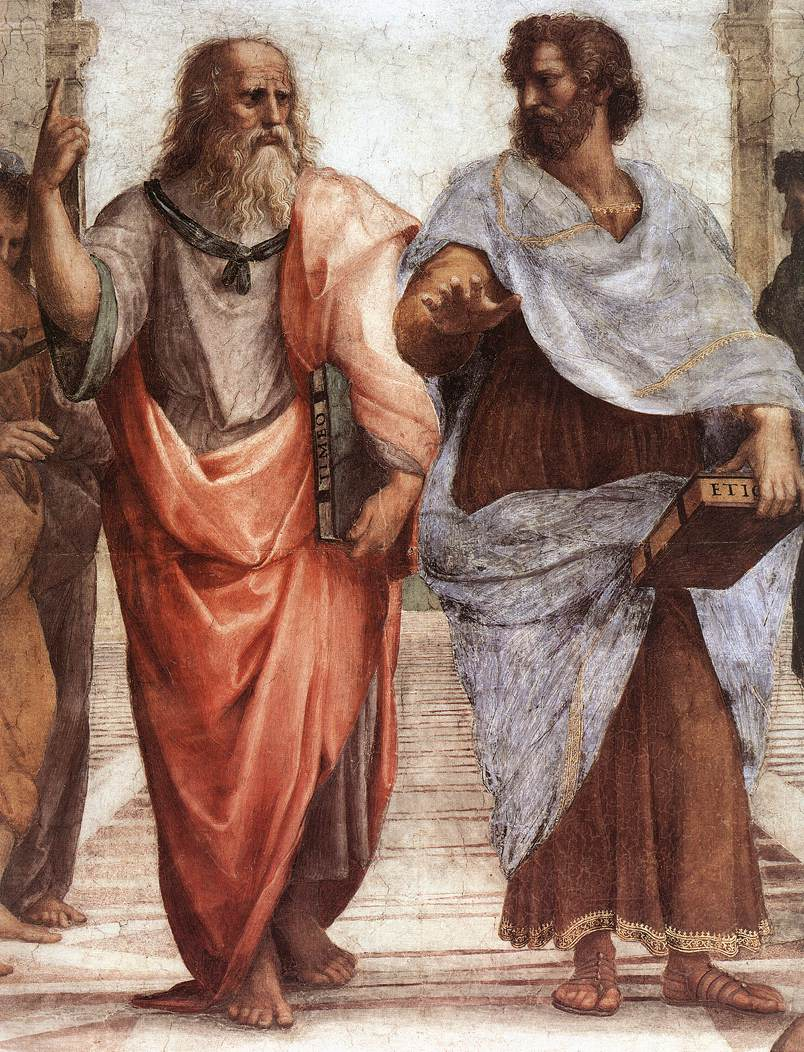
Plato (left) and Aristotle in Raphael's 1509 fresco The School of Athens

=== Classical philosophy ===
Greek theologia (θεολογία) was used with the meaning 'discourse on God' around 380 BC by Plato in The Republic.

Greek

... ὀρθῶς, ἔφη· ἀλλʼ αὐτὸ δὴ τοῦτο, οἱ τύποι περὶ θεολογίας τίνες ἂν εἶεν;
τοιοίδε πού τινες, ἦν δʼ ἐγώ· οἷος τυγχάνει ὁ θεὸς ὤν, ἀεὶ δήπου ἀποδοτέον, ἐάντέ τις αὐτὸν ἐν ἔπεσιν ποιῇ ἐάντε ἐν μέλεσιν ἐάντε ἐν τραγῳδίᾳ.

— Plato, Republic 379a. (emphasis added)
Translation:
English translation by Shorey (1969)

... Right, he said; but this very thing—the patterns or norms of right speech about the gods, what would they be?
Something like this, I said. The true quality of God we must always surely attribute to him whether we compose in epic, melic, or tragic verse.

— Plato, Republic 379a. (emphasis added)

Plato develops his rational theology (natural theology) in Book 10 of the Laws. In the dialogue, he opposes atheism and argues that the heavenly bodies are moved by the divine souls of the gods and their intelligence (nous). He also maintains that these gods care for humans and aim for the good of the universe as a whole.

Aristotle divided theoretical philosophy into mathematike, physike, and theologike, with the latter corresponding roughly to metaphysics, which, for Aristotle, included discourse on the nature of the divine.

Drawing on Greek Stoic sources, the Latin writer Varro distinguished three forms of such discourse:

1. mythical, concerning the myths of the Greek gods;
2. rational, philosophical analysis of the gods and of cosmology; and
3. civil, concerning the rites and duties of public religious observance.

=== Later usage ===
Some Latin Christian authors, such as Tertullian and Augustine, followed Varro's threefold usage. However, Augustine also defined theologia as "reasoning or discussion concerning the Deity".

The Latin author Boethius, writing in the early 6th century, used theologia to denote a subdivision of philosophy as a subject of academic study, dealing with the motionless, incorporeal reality; as opposed to physica, which deals with corporeal, moving realities. Boethius' definition influenced medieval Latin usage.

In patristic Greek Christian sources, theologia could refer narrowly to devout and/or inspired knowledge of and teaching about the essential nature of God.

In scholastic Latin sources, the term came to denote the rational study of the doctrines of the Christian religion, or (more precisely) the academic discipline that investigated the coherence and implications of the language and claims of the Bible and of the theological tradition (the latter often as represented in Peter Lombard's Sentences, a book of extracts from the Church Fathers).

In the Renaissance, especially with Florentine Platonist apologists of Dante's poetics, the distinction between 'poetic theology' (theologia poetica) and 'revealed' or Biblical theology serves as stepping stone for a revival of philosophy as independent of theological authority.

It is in the last sense, theology as an academic discipline involving rational study of Christian teaching, that the term passed into English in the 14th century, although it could also be used in the narrower sense found in Boethius and the Greek patristic authors, to mean rational study of the essential nature of God, a discourse now sometimes called theology proper.

From the 17th century onwards, the term theology began to be used to refer to the study of religious ideas and teachings that are not specifically Christian or correlated with Christianity (e.g., in the term natural theology, which denoted theology based on reasoning from natural facts independent of specifically Christian revelation) or that are specific to another religion (such as below).

Theology can also be used in a derived sense to mean "a system of theoretical principles; an (impractical or rigid) ideology".

== In religion ==
The term theology has been deemed by some as only appropriate to the study of religions that worship a supposed deity (a theos), i.e. more widely than monotheism; and presuppose a belief in the ability to speak and reason about this deity (in logia). They suggest the term is less appropriate in religious contexts that are organized differently (i.e., religions without a single deity, or that deny that such subjects can be studied logically). Hierology has been proposed, by such people as Eugène Goblet d'Alviella (1908), as an alternative, more generic term.

=== Abrahamic religions ===
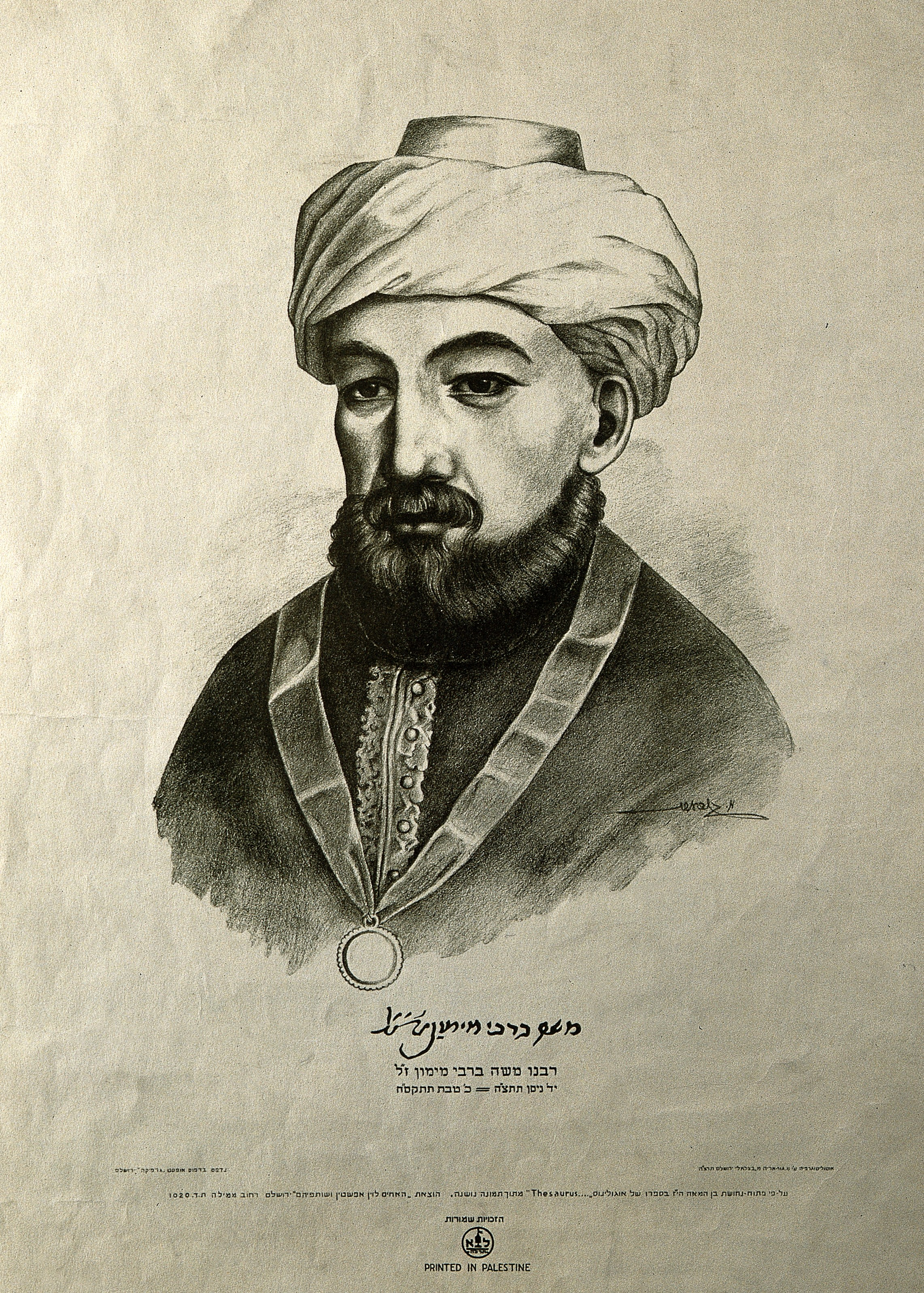
Illustration of the Jewish theologian Maimonides.

==== Judaism ====
In Jewish theology, the historical absence of political authority after the destruction of the Second Temple has meant that most theological reflection has happened within the context of the Jewish community and synagogue, including through rabbinical discussion of Jewish law and Midrash (rabbinic biblical commentaries). Jewish theology is also linked to ethics, as it is the case with theology in other religions, and therefore has implications for how one behaves.

==== Christianity ====
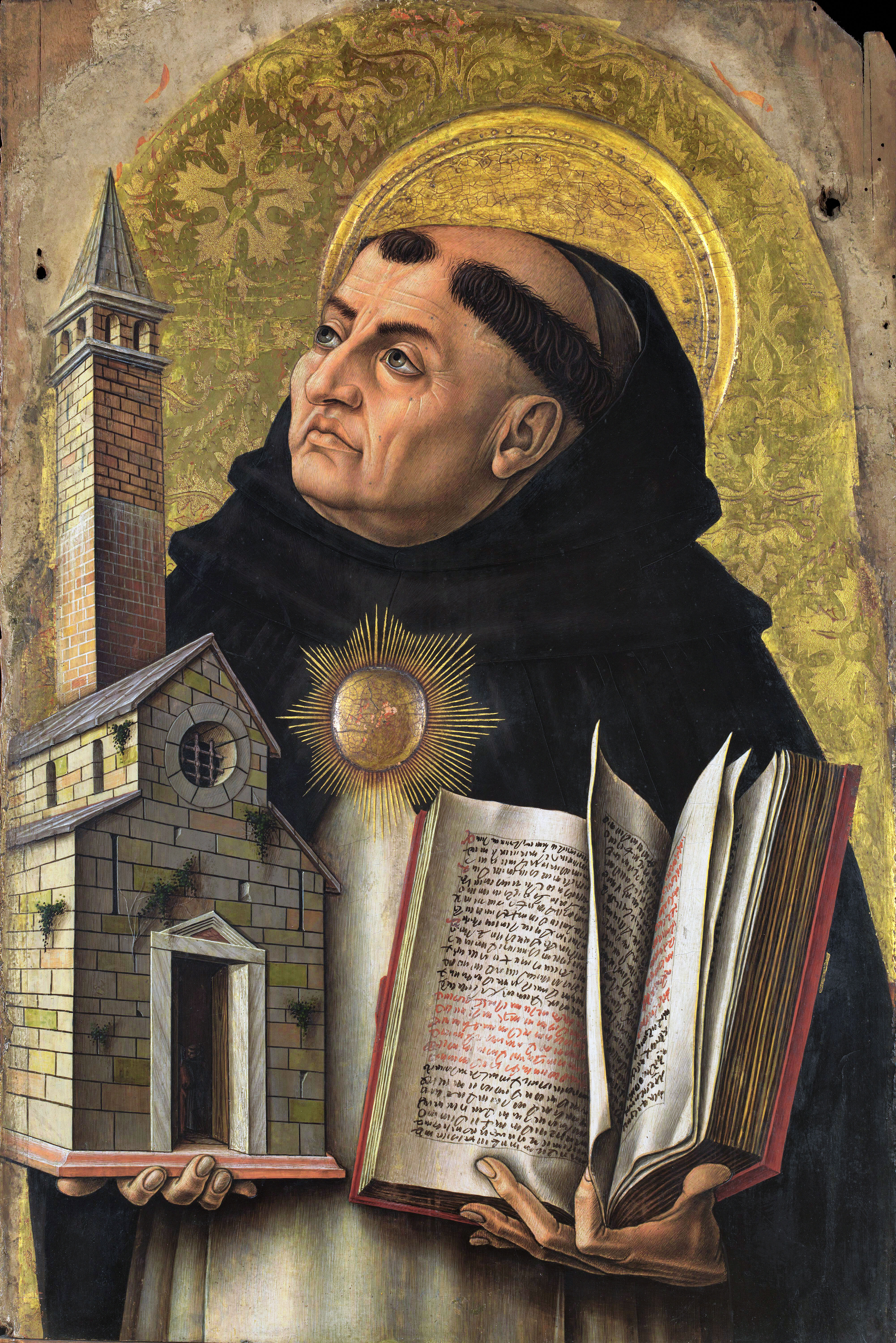
Thomas Aquinas, an influential 13th century theologian.

As defined by Thomas Aquinas, theology is constituted by a triple aspect: what is taught by God, teaches of God, and leads to God (Latin: Theologia a Deo docetur, Deum docet, et ad Deum ducit). This indicates the three distinct areas of God as theophanic revelation, the systematic study of the nature of divine and, more generally, of religious belief, and the spiritual path. Christian theology as the study of Christian belief and practice concentrates primarily upon the texts of the Old Testament and the New Testament as well as on Christian tradition. Christian theologians use biblical exegesis, rational analysis and argument. Theology might be undertaken to help the theologian better understand Christian tenets, to make comparisons between Christianity and other traditions, to defend Christianity against objections and criticism, to facilitate reforms in the Christian church, to assist in the propagation of Christianity, to draw on the resources of the Christian tradition to address some present situation or need, or for a variety of other reasons.

==== Islam ====
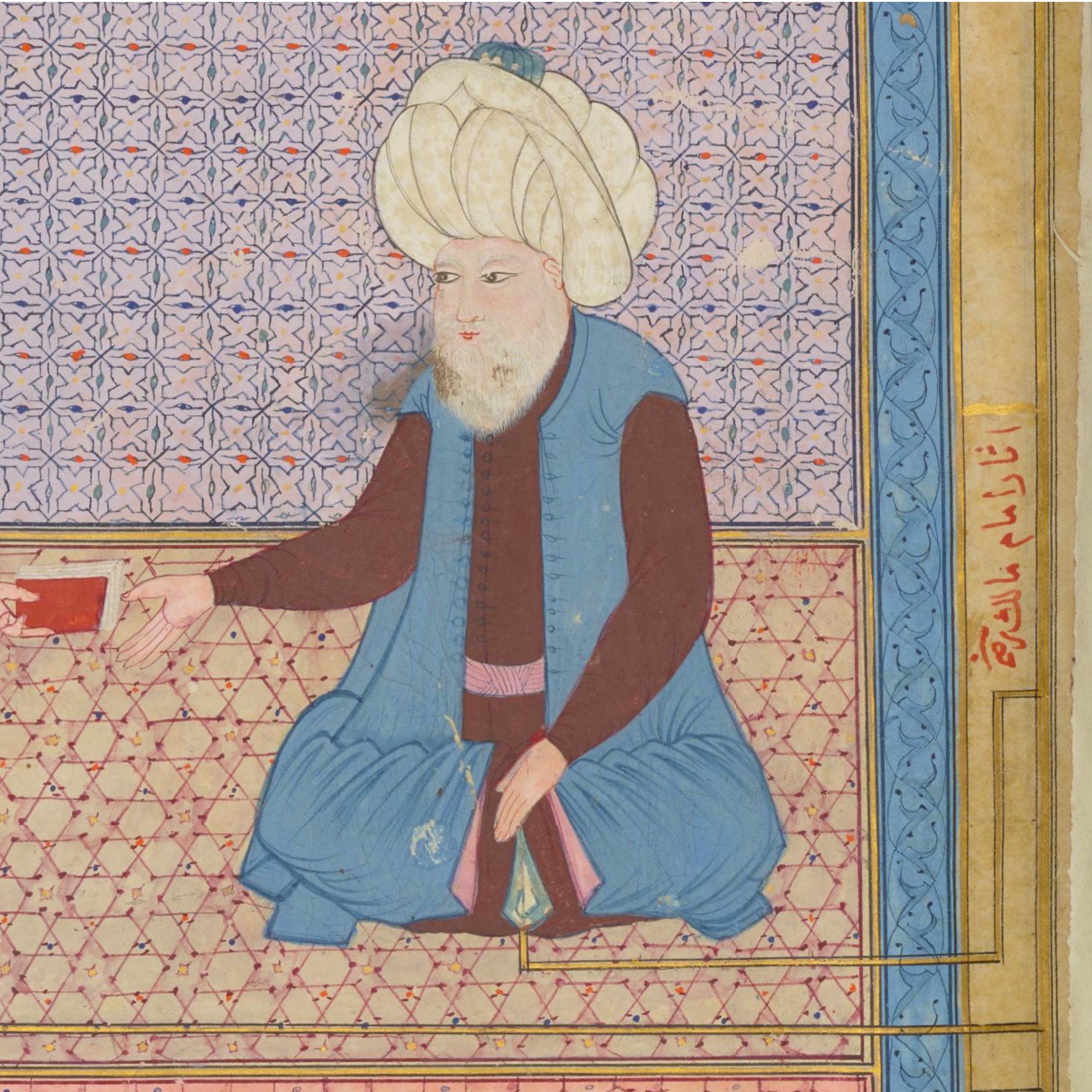
Islamic scholar, jurist and theologian Malik ibn Anas.

Islamic theological discussion that parallels Christian theological discussion is called Kalam; the Islamic analogue of Christian theological discussion would more properly be the investigation and elaboration of Sharia or Fiqh.

Kalam...does not hold the leading place in Muslim thought that theology does in Christianity. To find an equivalent for 'theology' in the Christian sense it is necessary to have recourse to several disciplines, and to the usul al-fiqh as much as to kalam.

— translated by L. Gardet

Some Universities in Germany established departments of islamic theology (e.g., the Deutsche Islamkonferenz).

=== Dharmic religions ===
==== Buddhism ====
Some academic inquiries within Buddhism, dedicated to the investigation of a Buddhist understanding of the world, prefer the designation Buddhist philosophy to the term Buddhist theology, since Buddhism lacks the same conception of a theos or a Creator God. Jose Ignacio Cabezon, who argues that the use of theology is in fact appropriate, can only do so, he says, because "I take theology not to be restricted to discourse on God.... I take 'theology' not to be restricted to its etymological meaning. In that latter sense, Buddhism is of course atheological, rejecting as it does the notion of God."

Whatever the case, there are various Buddhist theories and discussions on the nature of Buddhahood and the ultimate reality / highest form of divinity, which has been termed "buddhology" by some scholars like Louis de La Vallée-Poussin. This is a different usage of the term than when it is taken to mean the academic study of Buddhism, and here would refer to the study of the nature of what a Buddha is. In Mahayana Buddhism, a central concept in its buddhology is the doctrine of the three Buddha bodies (Sanskrit: Trikāya). This doctrine is shared by all Mahayana Buddhist traditions.

==== Hinduism ====
Within Hindu philosophy, there are numerous traditions of philosophical speculation on the nature of the universe, of God (termed Brahman, Paramatma, Ishvara, and/or Bhagavan in some schools of Hindu thought) and of the ātman (soul). The Sanskrit word for the various schools of Hindu philosophy is darśana ('view, viewpoint'), the most influential one in terms of modern Hindu religion is Vedanta and its various sub-schools, each of which presents a different theory of Ishvara (the Supreme lord, God).

Vaishnava theology has been a subject of study for many devotees, philosophers and scholars in India for centuries. A large part of its study lies in classifying and organizing the manifestations of thousands of gods and their aspects. In recent decades the study of Hinduism has also been taken up by a number of academic institutions in Europe, such as the Oxford Centre for Hindu Studies and Bhaktivedanta College.

There are also other traditions of Hindu theology, including the various theologies of Shaivism (which include dualistic and non-dualistic strands) as well as the theologies of the Goddess centered Shakta traditions which posit a feminine deity as the ultimate.

=== Other religions ===
==== Shinto ====
In Japan, the term theology (神学, shingaku) has been ascribed to Shinto since the Edo period with the publication of Mano Tokitsuna's Kokon shingaku ruihen (古今神学類編, 'categorized compilation of ancient theology'). In modern times, other terms are used to denote studies in Shinto—as well as Buddhist—belief, such as kyōgaku (教学, 'doctrinal studies') and shūgaku (宗学, 'denominational studies').

==== Modern Paganism ====
English academic Graham Harvey has commented that Pagans "rarely indulge in theology". Nevertheless, theology has been applied in some sectors across contemporary Pagan communities, including Wicca, Heathenry, Druidry and Kemetism. As these religions have given precedence to orthopraxy, theological views often vary among adherents. The term is used by Christine Kraemer in her book Seeking The Mystery: An Introduction to Pagan Theologies and by Michael York in Pagan Theology: Paganism as a World Religion.

== Topics ==
Richard Hooker defines theology as "the science of things divine". The term can, however, be used for a variety of disciplines or fields of study. Theology considers whether the divine exists in some form, such as in physical, supernatural, mental, or social realities, and what evidence for and about it may be found via personal spiritual experiences or historical records of such experiences as documented by others. The study of these assumptions is not part of theology proper, but is found in the philosophy of religion, and increasingly through the psychology of religion and neurotheology. Theology's aim, then, is to record, structure and understand these experiences and concepts; and to use them to derive normative prescriptions for the right way to live life.

== History of academic discipline ==
The history of the study of theology in institutions of higher education is as old as the history of such institutions themselves. For instance:

- Taxila was an early centre of Vedic learning, possible from the 6th-century BC or earlier;
- the Platonic Academy founded in Athens in the 4th-century BC seems to have included theological themes in its subject matter;
- the Chinese Taixue delivered Confucian teaching from the 2nd century BC;
- the School of Nisibis was a centre of Christian learning from the 4th century AD;
- Nalanda in India was a site of Buddhist higher learning from at least the 5th or 6th century AD; and
- the Moroccan University of Al-Karaouine was a centre of Islamic learning from the 10th century, as was Al-Azhar University in Cairo.

The earliest universities were developed under the aegis of the Latin Church by papal bull as studia generalia and perhaps from cathedral schools. It is possible, however, that the development of cathedral schools into universities was quite rare, with the University of Paris being an exception. Later they were also founded by kings (University of Naples Federico II, Charles University in Prague, Jagiellonian University in Kraków) or by municipal administrations (University of Cologne, University of Erfurt).

In the early medieval period, most new universities were founded from pre-existing schools, usually when these schools were deemed to have become primarily sites of higher education. Many historians state that universities and cathedral schools were a continuation of the interest in learning promoted by monasteries. Christian theological learning was, therefore, a component in these institutions, as was the study of church or canon law: universities played an important role in training people for ecclesiastical offices, in helping the church pursue the clarification and defence of its teaching, and in supporting the legal rights of the church over against secular rulers. At such universities, theological study was initially closely tied to the life of faith and of the church: it fed, and was fed by, practices of preaching, prayer and celebration of the Mass. Many of the first European universities, such as the University of Paris (established c. 1150), the University of Oxford (c. 1096), and the University of Bologna (1088), were founded primarily to educate clergy and focused initially on theological studies, with faculties in philosophy, law, and medicine developing later. Theology was traditionally regarded as the "queen of the sciences", with philosophy often described as its "handmaiden" due to its guiding role in the search for ultimate truth.

During the High Middle Ages, theology was the ultimate subject at universities, being named "The Queen of the Sciences". It served as the capstone to the Trivium and Quadrivium that young men were expected to study. This meant that the other subjects (including philosophy) existed primarily to help with theological thought. . p. 56: "philosophy, the scientia scientarum in one sense, was, in another, portrayed as the humble "handmaid of theology'."In this context, medieval theology in the Christian West could subsume fields of study which would later become more self-sufficient, such as metaphysics (Aristotle's "first philosophy", or ontology (the science of being).

Christian theology's preeminent place in the university started to come under challenge during the European Enlightenment, especially in Germany. Other subjects gained in independence and prestige, and questions were raised about the place of a discipline that seemed to involve a commitment to the authority of particular religious traditions in institutions that were increasingly understood to be devoted to independent reason.See the discussion of, for instance, Immanuel Kant's Conflict of the Faculties (1798), and J.G. Fichte's Deduzierter Plan einer zu Berlin errichtenden höheren Lehranstalt (1807) in

Since the early 19th century, various different approaches have emerged in the West to theology as an academic discipline. Much of the debate concerning theology's place in the university or within a general higher education curriculum centres on whether theology's methods are appropriately theoretical and (broadly speaking) scientific or, on the other hand, whether theology requires a pre-commitment of faith by its practitioners, and whether such a commitment conflicts with academic freedom.

=== Ministerial training ===
In some contexts, theology has been held to belong in institutions of higher education primarily as a form of professional training for Christian ministry. This was the basis on which Friedrich Schleiermacher, a liberal theologian, argued for the inclusion of theology in the new University of Berlin in 1810. For instance, in Germany, theological faculties at state universities are typically tied to particular denominations, Protestant or Roman Catholic, and those faculties will offer denominationally-bound (konfessionsgebunden) degrees, and have denominationally bound public posts amongst their faculty; as well as contributing "to the development and growth of Christian knowledge" they "provide the academic training for the future clergy and teachers of religious instruction at German schools".

In the United States, several prominent colleges and universities were started in order to train Christian ministers. Harvard, Georgetown, Boston University, Yale, Duke University, and Princeton all had the theological training of clergy as a primary purpose at their foundation.

Seminaries and bible colleges have continued this alliance between the academic study of theology and training for Christian ministry. There are, for instance, numerous prominent examples in the United States, including Phoenix Seminary, Catholic Theological Union in Chicago, The Graduate Theological Union in Berkeley, Criswell College in Dallas, The Southern Baptist Theological Seminary in Louisville, Trinity Evangelical Divinity School in Deerfield, Illinois, Dallas Theological Seminary, North Texas Collegiate Institute in Farmers Branch, Texas, and the Assemblies of God Theological Seminary in Springfield, Missouri. The only Judeo-Christian seminary for theology is the 'Idaho Messianic Bible Seminary' which is part of the Jewish University of Colorado in Denver.

=== Training for lay people ===
The Catholic Church's Decree on the Apostolate of the Laity, one of the later documents produced by the Second Vatican Council, also argues that "a solid doctrinal instruction in theology, ethics, and philosophy" in an important aspect of formation for lay people engaged in the work of Christian service and witness, alongside "spiritual formation".

=== As an academic discipline in its own right ===
In some contexts, scholars pursue theology as an academic discipline without formal affiliation to any particular church (though members of staff may well have affiliations to churches), and without focusing on ministerial training. This applies, for instance, to the Department of Theological Studies at Concordia University in Canada, and to many university departments in the United Kingdom, including the Faculty of Divinity at the University of Cambridge, the Department of Theology and Religion at the University of Exeter, and the Department of Theology and Religious Studies at the University of Leeds. Traditional academic prizes, such as the University of Aberdeen's Lumsden and Sachs Fellowship, tend to acknowledge performance in theology (or divinity as it is known at Aberdeen) and in religious studies.

=== Religious studies ===
In some contemporary contexts, a distinction is made between theology, which is seen as involving some level of commitment to the claims of the religious tradition being studied, and religious studies, which by contrast is normally seen as requiring that the question of the truth or falsehood of the religious traditions studied be kept outside its field. Religious studies involves the study of historical or contemporary practices or of those traditions' ideas using intellectual tools and frameworks that are not themselves specifically tied to any religious tradition and that are normally understood to be neutral or secular. In contexts where 'religious studies' in this sense is the focus, the primary forms of study are likely to include:

- Anthropology of religion
- Comparative religion
- History of religions
- Philosophy of religion
- Psychology of religion
- Sociology of religion

Sometimes, theology and religious studies are seen as being in tension, and at other times, they are held to coexist without serious tension. Occasionally it is denied that there is as clear a boundary between them.

== Criticism ==
=== Pre-20th century ===
Whether or not reasoned discussion about the divine is possible has long been a point of contention. Protagoras, as early as the fifth century BC, who is reputed to have been exiled from Athens because of his agnosticism about the existence of the gods, said that "Concerning the gods I cannot know either that they exist or that they do not exist, or what form they might have, for there is much to prevent one's knowing: the obscurity of the subject and the shortness of man's life."

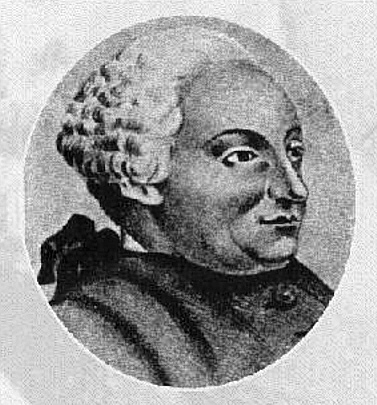
Baron d'Holbach

Since at least the eighteenth century, various authors have criticized the suitability of theology as an academic discipline. In 1772, Baron d'Holbach labeled theology "a continual insult to human reason" in Le Bon sens. Lord Bolingbroke, an English politician and political philosopher, wrote in Section IV of his Essays on Human Knowledge, "Theology is in fault not religion. Theology is a science that may justly be compared to the Box of Pandora. Many good things lie uppermost in it; but many evil lie under them, and scatter plagues and desolation throughout the world."

Thomas Paine, a Deistic American political theorist and pamphleteer, wrote in his three-part work The Age of Reason (1794, 1795, 1807):

The study of theology, as it stands in Christian churches, is the study of nothing; it is founded on nothing; it rests on no principles; it proceeds by no authorities; it has no data; it can demonstrate nothing; and it admits of no conclusion. Not anything can be studied as a science, without our being in possession of the principles upon which it is founded; and as this is the case with Christian theology, it is therefore the study of nothing.

The German atheist philosopher Ludwig Feuerbach sought to dissolve theology in his work Principles of the Philosophy of the Future: "The task of the modern era was the realization and humanization of God – the transformation and dissolution of theology into anthropology." This mirrored his earlier work The Essence of Christianity (1841), for which he was banned from teaching in Germany, in which he had said that theology was a "web of contradictions and delusions". The American satirist Mark Twain remarked in his essay "The Lowest Animal", originally written in around 1896, but not published until after Twain's death in 1910, that:

[Man] is the only animal that loves his neighbor as himself and cuts his throat if his theology isn't straight. He has made a graveyard of the globe in trying his honest best to smooth his brother's path to happiness and heaven.... The higher animals have no religion. And we are told that they are going to be left out in the Hereafter. I wonder why? It seems questionable taste.

=== 20th and 21st centuries ===
A. J. Ayer, a British former logical-positivist, sought to show in his essay "Critique of Ethics and Theology" that all statements about the divine are nonsensical and any divine-attribute is unprovable. He wrote: "It is now generally admitted, at any rate by philosophers, that the existence of a being having the attributes which define the god of any non-animistic religion cannot be demonstratively proved.... [A]ll utterances about the nature of God are nonsensical."

Jewish atheist philosopher Walter Kaufmann, in his essay "Against Theology", sought to differentiate theology from religion in general:

Theology, of course, is not religion; and a great deal of religion is emphatically anti-theological.... An attack on theology, therefore, should not be taken as necessarily involving an attack on religion. Religion can be, and often has been, untheological or even anti-theological.

However, Kaufmann found that "Christianity is inescapably a theological religion."

English atheist Charles Bradlaugh believed theology prevented human beings from achieving liberty, although he also noted that many theologians of his time held that, because modern scientific research sometimes contradicts sacred scriptures, the scriptures must therefore be wrong. Robert G. Ingersoll, an American agnostic lawyer, stated that, when theologians had power, the majority of people lived in hovels, while a privileged few had palaces and cathedrals. In Ingersoll's opinion, it was science that improved people's lives, not theology. Ingersoll further maintained that trained theologians reason no better than a person who assumes the devil must exist because pictures resemble the devil so exactly.

The British evolutionary biologist Richard Dawkins has been an outspoken critic of theology. In an article published in The Independent in 1993, he severely criticizes theology as entirely useless, declaring that it has completely and repeatedly failed to answer any questions about the nature of reality or the human condition. He states, "I have never heard any of them [i.e. theologians] ever say anything of the smallest use, anything that was not either platitudinously obvious or downright false." He then states that, if all theology were completely eradicated from the earth, no one would notice or even care. He concludes:

The achievements of theologians don't do anything, don't affect anything, don't achieve anything, don't even mean anything. What makes you think that 'theology' is a subject at all?

== See also ==
- Thealogy
