= The War Prayer =

1905 short story by Mark Twain

"The War Prayer", a short story or prose poem by Mark Twain, is a scathing indictment of war, and particularly of blind patriotic and religious fervor as motivations for war.

The structure of the work is simple: an unnamed country goes to war, and patriotic citizens attend a church service for soldiers who have been called up. The people call upon God to grant them victory and protect their troops. Suddenly, an "aged stranger" appears and announces that he is God's messenger. He explains to them that he is there to speak aloud the second part of their prayer for victory, the part which they have implicitly wished for but have not spoken aloud themselves: the prayer for the suffering and destruction of their enemies. What follows is a grisly depiction of hardships inflicted on war-torn nations by their conquerors. The story ends with the man being condemned as a lunatic, "for there was no sense in what he said".

== History ==
"The War Prayer" was written in 1905, and is believed to be a response to both the Spanish–American War and the subsequent Philippine–American War. It was left unpublished by Mark Twain at his death in April 1910, largely due to pressure from his family, who feared that the story would be considered sacrilegious. Twain's publisher and other friends also discouraged him from publishing it. According to one account, his illustrator Dan Beard asked him if he would publish it anyway, and Twain replied, "No, I have told the whole truth in that, and only dead men can tell the truth in this world. It can be published after I am dead." Mindful of public reaction, he considered that he had a family to support and did not want to be seen as a lunatic or fanatic.

Many sites on the internet claim that "The War Prayer" was first published in Harper's Magazine in November 1916, but this was the concluding chapter of a different Twain story, "The Mysterious Stranger." It was, however, included in Europe and Elsewhere (1923), a collection of Twain's essays edited by Albert Bigelow Paine, Twain's literary estate agent and biographer.

== Works based on the short story ==
The 1981 PBS filmed version of Twain's "A Private History of a Campaign That Failed" contains "The War Prayer" as an epilogue, which takes place during the Spanish–American War. Edward Herrmann played the Stranger, as well as the innocent man who had been killed accidentally by the boys years before in the American Civil War, thus lending a supernatural air to the Stranger's origins.

In 2006, the short film, War Prayer (2005), won the Best Director Award at the Beverly Hills Film Festival. Harold Cronk directed the film and adapted the screenplay from Twain's "The War Prayer".

In April 2007, a ten-minute, short film adaptation, entitled The War Prayer, was released by Lyceum Films. Written by Marco Sanchez and directed by Michael Goorjian, the adaptation starred Jeremy Sisto as "The Stranger" and Tim Sullivan as "The Preacher".

That same year, the journalist and Washington Monthly president Markos Kounalakis directed and produced an animated short film based on Twain's piece, also entitled The War Prayer. Narrated by Peter Coyote, it starred Lawrence Ferlinghetti as the Minister and Eric Bauersfeld as the Stranger.

In 2023, an illustrated book, entitled Mark Twain's War Prayer, was released. Illustrated by Seymour Chwast and including abridged words by Mark Twain regarding "The Lowest Animal".
