= Her Hidden Children =

2005 historical study by Chas S. Clifton

Her Hidden Children: The Rise of Wicca and Paganism in America
- First edition cover of Her Hidden Children.
- Author: Chas S. Clifton
- Language: English
- Subject: Religious studies Pagan studies
- Publisher: AltaMira Press
- Publication date: 2005
- Publication place: United States
- Media type: Print (Hardcover and paperback)
- Pages: 189
- ISBN: 978-0759102026

Her Hidden Children: The Rise of Wicca and Paganism in America is a historical study of Wicca and Contemporary Paganism in the United States. It was written by the American academic Chas S. Clifton of Colorado State University-Pueblo, and published by AltaMira Press in 2005.

Her Hidden Children was reviewed in a number of academic journals.

== Background ==
In 1999, the English historian Ronald Hutton of the University of Bristol had published his own study of Wiccan history, The Triumph of the Moon: A History of Modern Pagan Witchcraft.

== Reception and recognition ==
The book received generally positive reviews from a number of academic journals.
