= John Swinton (theologian) =

Scottish theologian (born 1957)

John Swinton, FBA, FRSE (born 1957) is a Scottish theologian, academic, and Presbyterian minister. He is the Chair in Divinity and Religious Studies at the School of Divinity, History, and Philosophy, University of Aberdeen. Swinton is founder of the university's Centre for Spirituality, Health and Disability.

== Biography ==
Swinton is an ordained minister of the Church of Scotland and Master of Christ’s College, the university's theological college. Swinton is a major figure in the development of disability theology. In 2016 he was awarded the Michael Ramsey Prize for theological writing for his book Dementia: Living in the Memories of God. In this book, he coins the word cortextualism to describe a modern belief that the cerebral cortex in the brain is the seat of personhood, with the result that people with dementia, intellectual disabilities, or other difficulties with higher-order thinking are viewed as lesser humans.

Swinton is Professor in Practical Theology and Pastoral care. He also serves as an honorary professor of nursing in the Centre for Advanced Studies in Nursing at Aberdeen University. In 2004 he founded the university's Centre for Spirituality, Health and Disability. The Centre has a dual focus: the relationship between spirituality and health and the theology of disability.

In 2012 Swinton was appointed Master of Christ’s College in Aberdeen by The Church of Scotland. In 2014 he established the Centre for Ministry Studies, a joint project between Christ’s College and the University of Aberdeen. It provides a broad range of education and training for both lay and ordained people.

Swinton has given numerous public lectures. In 2020 he gave the annual May MacLeod lecture at the United Theological College in Sydney.

He is one of the editors of the Journal of Health and Social Care Chaplaincy. He is also a former editor of Contact: The Interdisciplinary Journal of Pastoral Studies (Now re-titled Practical Theology. He is the founding editor of the Scottish Journal of Healthcare Chaplains. Swinton is also an ambassador for Sanctuary Mental Health Ministries.

== Honours ==
Swinton was awarded the Lanfranc Award for Education and Scholarship by the Archbishop of Canterbury in 2020. He was appointed a Chaplain to Her Majesty in Scotland in 2022.

He was elected a Fellow of the Royal Society of Edinburgh (FRSE) in 2021. In 2022, he was elected a Fellow of the British Academy (FBA), the United Kingdom's national academy for the humanities and social sciences.

== Selected works ==
- Finding Jesus in the Storm: The Spiritual Lives of Christians with Mental Health Challenges (2020). Grand Rapids: Eerdmans. ISBN 9780334059745
- A Graceful Embrace: Theological Reflections on Adopting Children (2017). Leiden: Brill. ISBN 9789004352902
- Becoming Friends of Time: Disability, Timefullness, and Gentle Discipleship (2018). Baylor University Press. ISBN 9781481304085
- Mental Health: The Inclusive Church Resource (2014) Darton, Longman & Todd (with Jean Vanier) ISBN 9780232530667
- Dementia: Living in the Memories of God (2012). Grand Rapids: Eerdmans. Published in the UK (2012) London: SCM Press
- Brock, BR. & Swinton, J. (eds) (2012). Disability in the Christian Tradition: A Reader Grand Rapids: Eerdmans.
- Living Well and Dying Faithfully: Christian Practices for End-Of-Life Care (2009) (Edited text with Richard Payne) Grand Rapids: Eerdmans.
- Living Gently in a Violent World: The Prophetic Witness of Weakness (2008) (With Stanley Hauerwas and Jean Vanier) IVP
- Raging With Compassion: Pastoral responses to the problem of evil(2007) Grand Rapids: Eerdmans. ISBN 0-8028-2997-X
- Theology, Disability and the New Genetics: Why Science Needs the Church (2007) (Edited text with Dr. Brian Brock) London: T&T Clarke.
- Practical Theology and Qualitative Research (2006) London: SCM Press (With Dr. Harriet Mowat) ISBN 0-334-02980-5
- Critical Reflections on Stanley Hauerwas’ Essays on Disability: Disabling society, enabling theology (2005) (Edited text with Stanley Hauerwas) New York: Haworth Press. ISBN 0-7890-2722-4
- Spirituality in Mental Health Care: Rediscovering a “forgotten” dimension (2001) Jessica Kingsley Publishers, London. ISBN 1-85302-804-5
- Resurrecting the Person: Friendship and the care of people with severe mental health problems (2000) Abingdon Press, Nashville. ISBN 0-687-08228-5.
- The Spiritual Dimension of Pastoral Care: Practical theology in a multidisciplinary context (2000) (Edited Text with David Willows) Jessica Kingsley Publishers, London. ISBN 1-85302-892-4.
- From Bedlam to Shalom: Towards a practical theology of human nature. Interpersonal relationships and mental health care (2000) Peter Lang, New York. ISBN 0-8204-4425-1.
