= Nature Religion Today =

1998 book edited by Joanne Pearson, Richard H. Roberts and Geoffrey Samuel

Nature Religion Today: Paganism in the Modern World
- Cover of the book
- Author: Joanne Pearson, Richard H. Roberts and Geoffrey Samuel (editors)
- Language: English
- Subject: Religious studies Pagan studies
- Publisher: Edinburgh University Press
- Publication date: 1998
- Publication place: United Kingdom
- Media type: Print (Paperback)
- Pages: 222
- ISBN: 978-0-7486-1057-0

Nature Religion Today: Paganism in the Modern World is an academic anthology edited by the British religious studies scholars Joanne Pearson, Richard H. Roberts and Geoffrey Samuel which was published by Edinburgh University Press in 1998. Containing fourteen separate papers produced by various scholars working in the field of Pagan studies, the book examines different forms of contemporary Paganism as practiced in Europe and North America.

Divided into three parts, the first, entitled "A Chthonic Imperative? Religion and Nature in the Modern World" contained papers from scholars such as Peter Beyer, Steven Sutcliffe and Wouter J. Hanegraaff and dealt with the relationship between contemporary Paganism and various features of contemporary society, such as globalisation and the secularisation of the natural world. The second part, entitled "The Pagan Alternative: the Goddess and Nature", contained papers by Prudence Jones, Ronald Hutton, Susan Greenwood, Elizabeth Puttick and Geoffrey Samuel dealing with the role of goddess figures in the Pagan movement. Finally, the third part of the book, entitled "Nature Religion in Practice", contained articles by Jone Salomonsen, Philip Shallcrass, Vivianne Crowley and Alastair McIntosh dealing with the various religious practices of Pagans.

== Origins ==
The first international academic conference on the subject of Pagan studies had been held at the University of Newcastle upon Tyne, North-East England in 1993, having been organised by the religious studies scholars Graham Harvey and Charlotte Hardman. In April 1996 a larger conference dealing with contemporary Paganism then took place at Ambleside in the Lake District; organised by the Department of Religious Studies at the University of Lancaster, North-West England, it was entitled "Nature Religion Today: Western Paganism, Shamanism and Esotericism in the 1990s". The conference's organisers later described its original intentions, remarking that through it they "sought to explore the innovations in practice and belief which constitute contemporary Paganism, and which appear to be a part of a widespread cultural response to the decay of main-line religions and to a widely felt awareness of ecological crisis."

== Synopsis ==
=== Part One: A Cthonic Imperative? Religion and Nature in the Modern World ===
==== Beyer's "Globalisation and the Religion of Nature" ====
The anthology's opening paper was written by Peter Beyer, then an Associate Professor of Religious Studies at the University of Ottawa, Canada, and the author of the book Religion and Globalization (1994). In this paper, Beyer delved the definition of "nature religion" developed by the American religious studies scholar Catherine Albanese, looking at those religious movements whose "devotees consider nature to be the embodiment of divinity, sacredness, transcendence, spiritual power, or whatever cognate term one wishes to use". Proceeding to provide a basic summary of globalisation, he then made a brief discussion of how the two interact, arguing that nature religions had a tendency to develop a counter-structural strategy in dealing with globalising forces. In this manner they emphasise the idea that spiritual authenticity is stronger among the oppressed, such as those indigenous communities who adhere to nature religionist beliefs.

==== Hanegraaff's "Reflections on New Age and the Secularisation of Nature" ====
Beyer's paper was followed by that provided by Wouter J. Hanegraaff, then a research associate at the University of Utrecht and the author of New Age Religion and Western Culture: Esotericism in the Mind of Secular Thought (1996).
