= Christ's College, Aberdeen =

Former college of the University of Aberdeen

Coordinates: 57°9′50″N 2°5′57″W

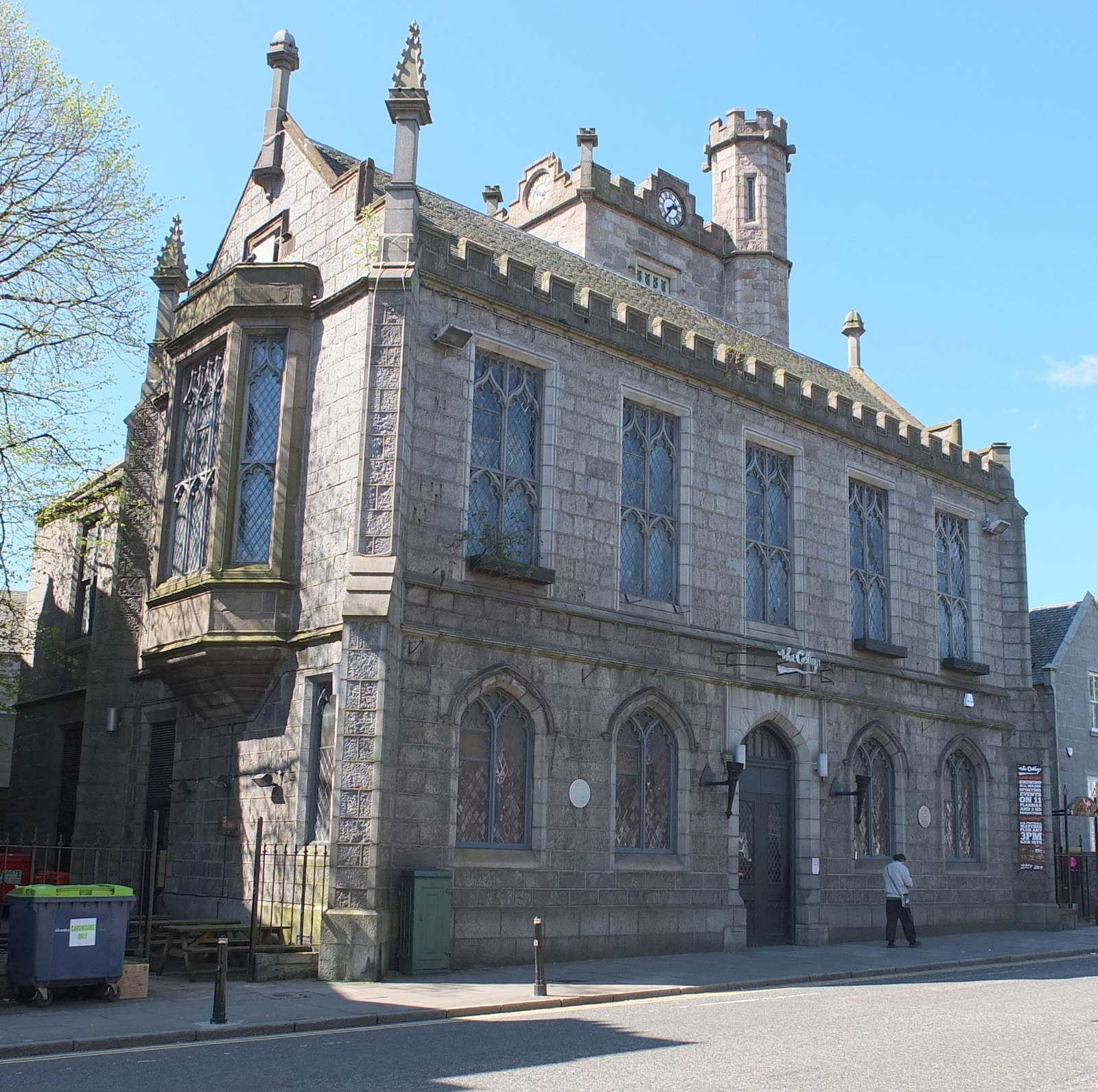
The former Christ's College building, now College Bar

Christ's College was one of three colleges in Scotland founded by the Free Church of Scotland for the training of ministers following the Disruption of 1843. The other two were New College, Edinburgh and Trinity College, Glasgow.

Following the Church reunion of 1929, Christ's College became a Church of Scotland college and was integrated into the University of Aberdeen. It is now based within the university's King's College campus in Old Aberdeen. The college's former buildings in the west end of Aberdeen are no longer used by the church or university, having been sold in the 1990s, and the library relocated to the former archeology museum in King's College.

The post of Master of Christ's College is still a Church of Scotland appointment, but for most purposes it is closely connected with the University of Aberdeen's School of Divinity, History and Philosophy. The current Master is the Rev. Professor John Swinton, who was appointed in 2012.

The principal role of Christ's College is to oversee the preparation and formation of ministerial candidates for the Church of Scotland. From its offices in the University of Aberdeen, the college collaborates closely with the divinity faculty to ensure candidates receive appropriate academic training for the ministry, funding a lectureship in Practical Theology, organizing extramural lectures and seminars, and hosting an annual lecture at the beginning of each academic year. In addition, the college maintains the Divinity Library, which serves all undergraduates within the department. It also organises a weekly Chapter Service during each academic term. The college administers the Lumsden and Sachs Fellowship, awarded to the University of Aberdeen's most outstanding graduating student in Divinity and Religious Studies.

== See also ==
- Aberdeen
