= Modern Paganism in World Cultures =

2005 book edited by Michael F. Strmiska

Modern Paganism in World Cultures: Comparative Perspectives
- The cover of the book
- Author: Michael F. Strmiska (editor)
- Language: English
- Subject: Religious studies Pagan studies
- Publisher: ABC-CLIO
- Publication date: 2005
- Publication place: United States
- Media type: Print (Hardcover)
- Pages: 382
- ISBN: 978-1-85109-608-4

Modern Paganism in World Cultures: Comparative Perspectives is an academic anthology edited by the American religious studies scholar Michael F. Strmiska which was published by ABC-CLIO in 2005. Containing eight separate papers produced by various scholars working in the field of Pagan studies, the book examines different forms of contemporary Paganism as practiced in Europe and North America. Modern Paganism in World Cultures was published as a part of ABC-CLIO's series of books entitled "Religion in Contemporary Cultures", in which other volumes were dedicated to religious movements like Buddhism and Islam.

Edited by Strmiska, then a lecturer at Central Connecticut State University in New Britain, Connecticut, the volume contained contributions from scholars from a variety of academic backgrounds, some of whom were practicing Pagans themselves. In her paper, the American folklorist Sabina Magliocco discussed "ethnic ambivalence" amongst the Italian American community in regards to the relationship between Stregheria and Wicca, whilst the Irish folklorist Jenny Butler dealt with the place of contemporary Druidry in Ireland. In a paper co-written by Strmiska and Icelandic anthropologist Baldur A. Sigurvinsson, the religion of Asatru in both Iceland and the United States was compared, which is followed by a piece by British anthropologist Jenny Blain looking at the way in which British Heathens viewed sacred sites. The sixth paper, written by environmental studies scholar Adrian Ivakhiv, looked at Paganism in Ukraine, whilst the seventh, co-written once more by Strmiska, this time with humanities scholar Vilius Rudra Dundzila, looked at Romuva in both Lithuania and the U.S. The final paper, produced by military veteran Stephanie Urquhart, looked at the acceptance of Pagans in the U.S. military.

Academic reviews were largely positive, praising the various papers for expanding the knowledge of Pagan studies by focusing on less well known religions like Romuva and Asatru rather than Wicca, the dominant Pagan faith to which the majority of literature in the field of Pagan studies had been devoted up until that point.

== Background ==
Michael Strmiska had gained an MA in the Religions of India from the University of Wisconsin–Madison before going on to gain a PhD in Religious Studies from Boston University. Proceeding to teach Comparative Religion and World History, he worked at universities in Lithuania, the United States and Japan, and at the time of Modern Paganism in World Cultures' publication was lecturing in World History at Central Connecticut State University.

Strmiska decided to allow the contributing authors to choose whether they would use the term "Pagan" or "Neopagan" in reference to the contemporary religious movements, arguing that they should do so according to which term "is best suited to their topics."

== Synopsis ==
Strmiska's "Comparative Perspectives"

In his opening chapter, which shares its name with the book, Michael Strmiska discusses the significance of Paganism to the contemporary world, although notes that this volume deals specifically with the movement in Europe and North America, "in the belief that this regional focus provides a coherent frame of discussion with a number of intriguing commonalities and contrasts without degenerating into a global encyclopaedia." Noting that earlier studies of Pagan studies had focused primarily on the religion of Wicca and on the Pagan movement in the U.S. and U.K., Strmiska explained that in this volume, he had widened the geographical scope by focusing on forms of Paganism other than Wicca and on the movement in other parts of Europe and North America, such as in Canada, Ireland and Iceland.

Proceeding to look at the various definitions of the terms "Pagan" and "Neopagan", Strmiska discusses why some contemporary westerners choose to adopt such terms when they have a pejorative meaning in western culture, concluding that not only was it an "appealing marker" in expressing their non-Christian beliefs, but that it also served to give them a sense of connection to ancient pre-Christian peoples and as "a deliberate act of defiance" against a Christian-dominated culture.

Magliocco's "Italian American Stregheria and Wicca"

The second paper in the volume was provided by the American folklorist Sabina Magliocco, who had studied the Pagan community in the U.S. for a number of years, resulting in the publication of two books, Neo-pagan Sacred Art and Altars: Making Things Work (2002) and Witching Culture: Folklore and Neo-paganism in America (2004).

Butler's "Druidry in Contemporary Ireland"

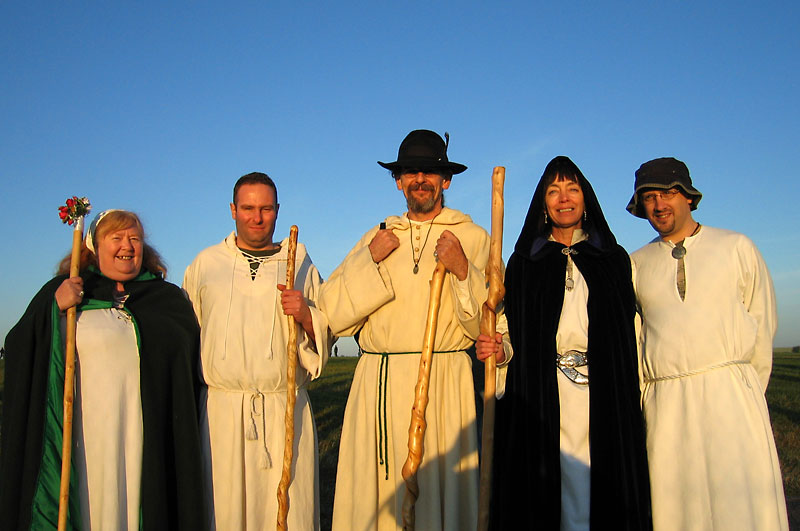
A group of Druids, members of the new religious movement which Jenny Butler studied

In the book's third paper, the Irish folklorist Jenny Butler, who was then studying for a PhD on Paganism in Ireland at the Department of Folklore and Ethnology at University College Cork and now based at the UCC's Department of Study of Religions, looked at the role of contemporary Druidry in the country.

Strmiska and Sigurvinsson's "Asatru"

Blain's "Heathenry, the Past, and Sacred Sites in Today's Britain"

Ivakhiv'a "The Revival of Ukrainian Native Faith"

Strmiska and Dundzila's "Romuva"

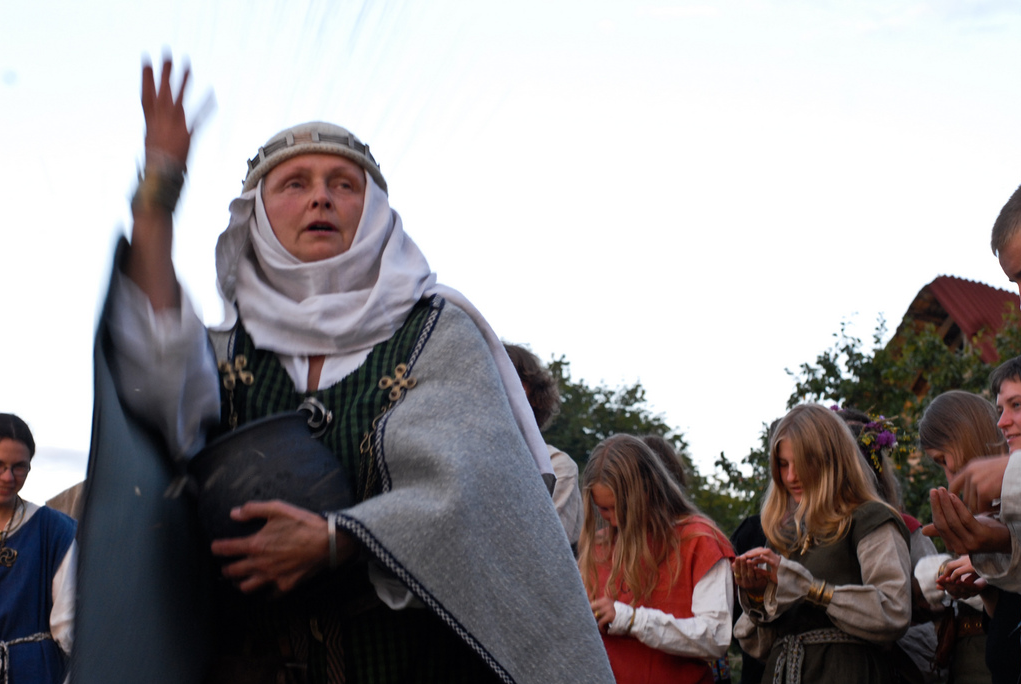
Inija Trinkūnienė leading a Romuva ritual

Urquhart's "Onward Pagan Soldiers"

== Reception and recognition ==
=== Academic reviews ===
In a highly positive review published in The Pomegranate: The International Journal of Pagan Studies, the religious studies scholar Nikki Bado-Fralick of Iowa State University described Modern Paganism in World Cultures as an "engaging and insightful look into several under-reported forms of European and North American Contemporary Paganism". Considering it to be "extremely well written, accessible, and organized", Bado-Fralick felt that the work made "a delightful addition to the growing body of first-rate scholarship on Contemporary Paganism." Praising the use of maps in the book, she felt however that "I found myself wishing for more detailed maps when authors referred to groups from specific counties or regional areas." Ultimately, Bado-Fralick considered the work to be "securely placed to become a mainstay of the Pagan scholar's bookshelf."

The anthology was also reviewed by Robert Ellwood of the University of Southern California for the Nova Religio journal, who considered it notable that it focused primarily on non-Wiccan variants of Paganism. Considering the work to be a "substantial contribution" to contemporary religious studies, he notes that the price of the volume will put many individuals off of purchasing it, but that he hoped most major libraries would acquire a copy.
