= Lumsden and Sachs Fellowship =

The Lumsden and Sachs Fellowship, also known as the Lumsden and Sachs Prize in Biblical Studies, is a prize awarded by Christ's College, Aberdeen to the overall, most distinguished graduate of the year having studied in the Department of Divinity and Religious Studies of the University of Aberdeen.

Fellows include Rev John Macdonald, Rev John Morrison, Rev Dr John Alexander Selbie, Mark Paul Lindley-Highfield of Ballumbie Castle, FRAI, Rev Dr Philip Bolton Wilson, Dr Jonathan Miles-Watson, Dr Ian Kenneth McEwan, FRSE, David Webster, son of John Bainbridge Webster, and Rev Peter Diack, M.A.

== Christ's College ==
Christ's College, Aberdeen is the body in Aberdeen responsible for ministerial training for the Church of Scotland. It works closely with the University of Aberdeen in administering the Divinity Library, providing weekly Chapter Services on Campus, funding a Lectureship in Practical Theology, sponsoring and holding lectures and seminars, and managing bequests and legacies, including the Lumsden and Sachs Fellowship.
