= Chas S. Clifton =

American academic, author and historian

- Born: 1951 (age 74–75)
- Education: Reed College (BA), University of Colorado (MA)
- Occupations: English studies scholar; Pagan studies scholar
- Employer(s): Pueblo Community College, Colorado State University-Pueblo (1992–c.2006),

Chas S. Clifton (born 1951) is an American academic, author and historian who specialises in the fields of English studies and Pagan studies. Clifton currently holds a teaching position in English at Colorado State University-Pueblo, prior to which he taught at Pueblo Community College.

A practicing Pagan since the early 1970s, Clifton has written widely on the subject, in both a practical and an academic capacity, with a particular emphasis on the Pagan religion of Wicca. He has become a prominent figure in the field of Pagan studies, editing both the peer-reviewed academic journal The Pomegranate, and the Pagan Studies Series of academic books published by AltaMira Press. He also serves as co-chair of the American Academy of Religion's Pagan Studies Group.

== Biography ==
=== Early life: 1951–1991 ===
Clifton was born in 1951, and raised in the Anglican denomination of Christianity. Undertaking his undergraduate studies in English at Reed College in Portland, Oregon, during a summer vacation in 1972 he aided a teacher in the construction of an adobe house near Taos, New Mexico. Here, he read a copy of Robert Graves' The White Goddess; believing that it represented a "religion for poets", it sparked his interest in Paganism. Returning to Reed for his final year, he read more of Graves' work, producing his thesis – a book of poems entitled Queen Famine – under his influence. He self-initiated himself into Paganism through a rite found in Hans Holzer's book The New Pagans before moving to Colorado and joining a group of ceremonial magicians influenced by the Pagan religion of Thelema. The following year he joined a Witches' coven with "loose ties" to the 1734 Tradition alongside his partner Mary, and several years later they underwent a Pagan marriage ceremony.

Starting his own magazine, Iron Mountain: A Journal of Magical Religion in the mid-1980s, he also started a graduate degree in religious studies at the University of Colorado, moving from Manitou Springs to Boulder. Circa 1986, he became contributing editor for Gnosis: The Journal of Western Inner Traditions, through which he began corresponding with Evan John Jones and Felicitas Goodman, and began writing a syndicated column titled "Letter from Hardscrabble Creek".

=== Academic career: 1992–2012 ===
Clifton began teaching in the English department at the University of Southern Colorado in 1992. With Jones, he co-wrote a book titled Sacred Mask, Sacred Dance (1997), after which they had planned a sequel, The Castle and the Cave: Further Steps in Traditional Witchcraft, but it never saw completion.

A member of the American Academy of Religion (AAR), he was involved in a 1997 meeting to discuss the possibility of setting up a specific AAR group to discuss Paganism; the AAR governing committee turned them down, believing that their work could be fitted into the New Religious Movements discussion group, but they successfully reapplied in 2004. Clifton and Jone Salomonsen became co-chairs.

In 2001, Clifton became editor of The Pomegranate, a scholarly journal devoted to Pagan studies then based in North America. Taking over the position from Fritz Muntean, who had co-founded the journal in 1996, together they searched for a new publisher, that year signing an agreement with Janet Joyce of the London-based company Equinox Publishing. Clifton proceeded to oversee a series of changes to the journal, transforming its subtitle from A New Journal of Neopagan Thought to The International Journal of Pagan Studies and implementing a peer review system for judging the papers submitted to it for publication.

In 2004, he published Her Hidden Children, making use of the mass of materials he had assembled over the years. It appeared as the first in the "Pagan Studies Series" published by AltaMira Press; first devised by an editor in the late 1990s, the series came to fruition under the co-editorship of Clifton and Wendy Griffin. Clifton took an early retirement when his departmental head left, believing that the future would not be conducive to his research.

== Bibliography ==
Title	Year	Co-author(s)	Publisher	ISBN
Ghost Tales of Cripple Creek	1983	n/a	Little London	978-0-936564296
Encyclopedia of Heresies and Heretics	1992	n/a	ABC-Clio	978-0874366003
Witchcraft Today, Book One: The Modern Craft Movement	1992	edited volume	Llewellyn Worldwide	978-0875423779
Witchcraft Today Book Two: Modern Rites of Passage	1993	edited volume	Llewellyn Worldwide	978-0875423787
Witchcraft Today, Book Three: Shamanism and Witchcraft	1995	edited volume	Llewellyn Worldwide	978-1567181503
Witchcraft today, Book Four: Living Between Two Worlds: Challenges of the Modern Witch	1996	edited volume	Llewellyn Worldwide	978-1567181511
Sacred Mask, Sacred Dance	1997	Evan John Jones	Llewellyn Worldwide	978-1567183735
The Paganism Reader	2004	edited volume, with Graham Harvey	Routledge	978-0415303524
Her Hidden Children: The Rise of Wicca And Contemporary Paganism in America	2006	n/a	AltaMira Press	978- 0759102015

- 'The Significance of Aradia.' In Aradia, or the Gospel of the Witches: A New Translation, edited by Mario Pazzaglini and Dina Pazzaglini, 59-80. Phoenix Publishing, 1998. ISBN 0-919345-34-4.
- 'Smokey and the Sacred: Nature Religion, Civil Religion, and American Paganism,' Ecotheology: The Journal of Religion, Nature and the Environment, 8(1) (August 2003): 50-60.
