= Graham Harvey (religious studies scholar) =

Religious studies scholar

Professor Graham Harvey
- Born: 25 August 1959 (age 65)
- Education: Newcastle University
- Occupations: Religious studies; Research

Graham Harvey (born 25 August 1959) is an English religious studies scholar. He specialises in modern Paganism, indigenous religions and animism.

== Life and work ==
Graham Harvey was born in 1959. He obtained a Ph.D. title at the University of Newcastle upon Tyne in 1991 on a dissertation about group identity in ancient Jewish literature. From 1991 to 1995 he taught religious studies in Newcastle. From 1996 to 2003 he worked as a reader and principal lecturer in religious studies at the King Alfred's College, Winchester. Since 2003 he works at the Open University where he is a professor and was head of the religious studies department from 2013 to 2017.

After being invited to do a presentation about contemporary druids, Harvey began to do fieldwork about modern Paganism which resulted in several books, notably Listening People, Speaking Earth: Contemporary Paganism (1997) and Researching Paganisms (2004). He has written extensively about indigenous religions and animism, producing the monograph Animism: Respecting the Living World (2005) and the edited volume The Handbook of Contemporary Animism (2013). In the monograph Food, Sex & Strangers: Understanding Religion as Everyday Life (2013) he seeks to define religion through people's behaviours and everyday practices rather than belief.

Harvey practices modern Paganism with druid orders and as animism with ecological activists. He is married and also participates in Jewish celebrations with his wife.

== Selected publications ==
Monographs

- The True Israel: Uses of the Names Jew, Hebrew and Israel in Ancient Jewish and Early Christian Literature, Brill, 1996
- Listening People, Speaking Earth: Contemporary Paganism, Hurst, 1997
- Animism: Respecting the Living World, Hurst, 2005
- What do Pagans Believe?, Granta, 2007
- Food, Sex and Strangers: Understanding Religion as Everyday Life, Routledge, 2013

Edited volumes

- Words Remembered, Texts Renewed: Festschrift for Prof John F.A. Sawyer, with Jon Davies and Wilfred G. E. Watson, Sheffield Academic Press, 1995
- Paganism Today: Witches, Druids, the Goddess and Ancient Earth Traditions for the Twenty-First Century, with Charlotte Hardman, Thorsons, 1996
- Indigenous Religions: A Companion, Cassell, 2000
- Law and Religion in Contemporary Society: Communities, Individualism and the State, with Peter W. Edge, Ashgate, 2000
- Indigenous religious musics, with Karen Ralls-MacLeod, Ashgate, 2000
- Shamanism: A Reader, Routledge, 2003
- Historical Dictionary of Shamanism, with Robert Wallis, Scarecrow, 2004
- Researching Paganisms, with Jenny Blain and Douglas Ezzy, AltaMira, 2004
- The Paganism Reader, with Chas S. Clifton, Routledge, 2004
- Ritual and Religious Belief: a reader, Equinox, 2005
- Indigenous diasporas and dislocations, with Charles D. Thompson Jr, Ashgate, 2005
- Religions in Focus: New Approaches to Tradition and Contemporary Practices, Equinox, 2009
- Handbook of Contemporary Animism, Acumen, 2013
- Edward Burnett Tylor, Religion and Culture, with Paul-François Tremlett and Liam T. Sutherland, Bloomsbury, 2017
- Sensual Religion: Religion and the Five Senses, with Jessica Hughes, Equinox, 2018
- Indigenizing Movements in Europe, Equinox, 2020
- Reassembling Democracy: Ritual and Cultural Resource, with Michael Houseman, Sarah M. Pike and Jone Salomonsen, Bloomsbury, 2020
