= The Lowest Animal =

1896 philosophical essay by Mark Twain

The Lowest Animal, also titled Man's Place in the Animal World, is a philosophical essay written by American author Mark Twain in 1896. Twain describes fictional experiments he did with animals in which they showed greater civility than humans. He uses satire in order to criticize humanity's continuous desire for power. The original source was prefaced by newspaper clippings which, apparently, dealt with religious persecutions in Crete. The clippings have been lost.

== Summary ==
In the essay Twain satirizes human nature by describing a series of experiments he supposedly conducted at the London Zoological Gardens. Twain takes Darwin's theory of evolution that humans evolved from earlier ancestors, or “lower animals,” and reverses it. He describes deeds done by powerful people against the helpless, and states the many ideas that made him ponder about the lack of humanity. He ends the essay with these words:

And so I find that we have descended and degenerated, from some far ancestor (some microscopic atom wandering at its pleasure between the mighty horizons of a drop of water perchance) insect by insect, animal by animal, reptile by reptile, down the long highway of smirch less innocence, till we have reached the bottom stage of development (namable as the Human Being). Below us, nothing.
