= Indigenous religion =

Indigenous religious belief systems

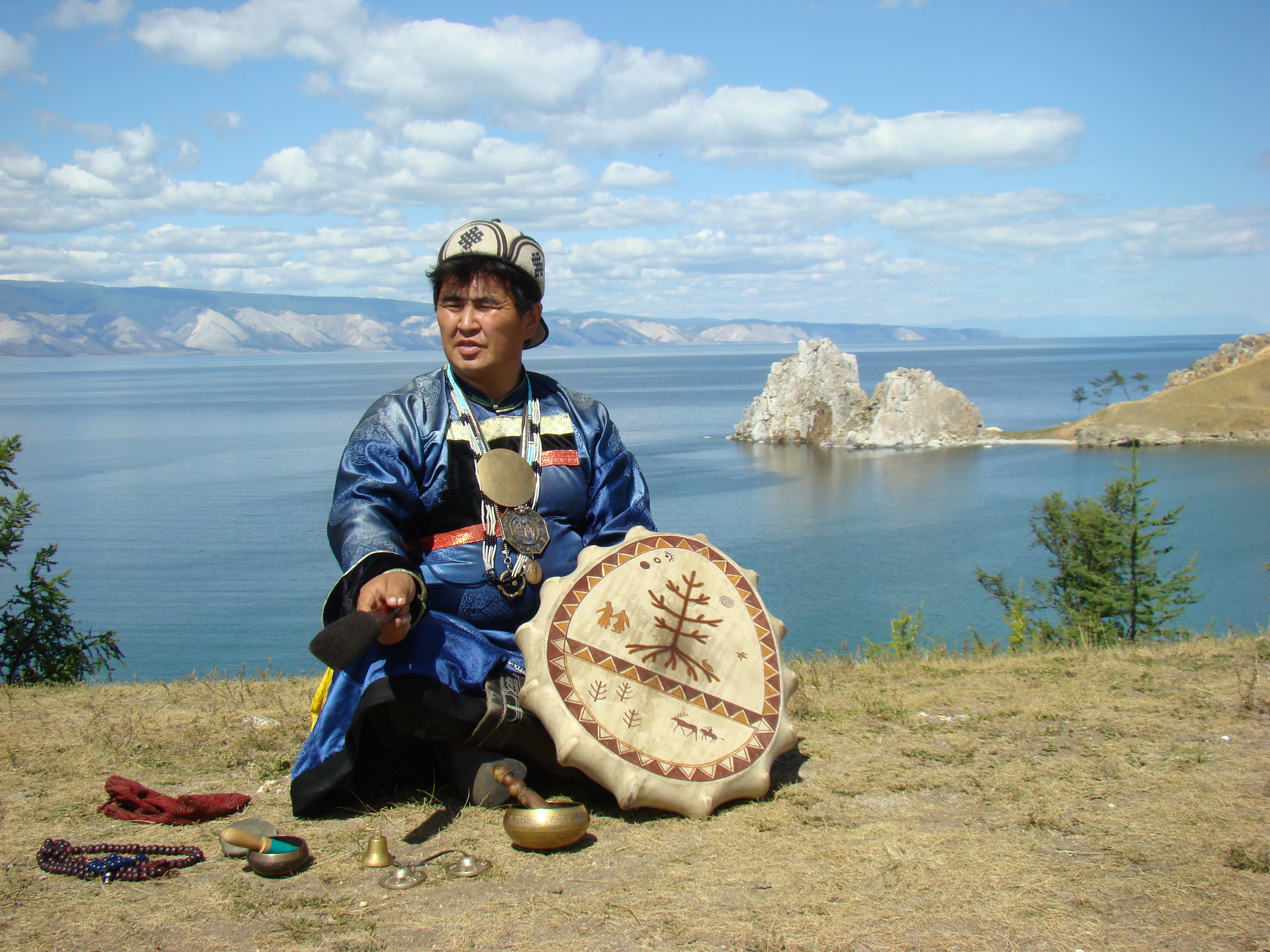
A Buryat religious specialist in Olkhon. Because they have undergone Russian colonialism, the Buryat's belief system is labeled an "indigenous religion".

Indigenous religion or native religion is a category used in the study of religion to demarcate the religious belief systems of communities described as being "indigenous". This category is often juxtaposed against others such as the "world religions" and "new religious movements". The term is commonly applied to a range of different belief systems across the Americas, Oceania, Asia, Africa, and Europe.

The term "indigenous religions" is usually applied to the localised belief systems of small-scale societies. These belief systems do not typically engage in proselytization, thus distinguishing them from movements like Christianity, Islam, and Buddhism that all seek converts and which are typically classified as "world religions". They are also often characterised as being distinct from the "world religions" because they are orally transmitted, intertwined with traditional lifestyles, and pluralist. Numerically, most of the world's religions could be classed as "indigenous", although the number of "indigenous religionists" is significantly smaller than the number of individuals who practice one of the "world religions".

Within the study of religion, there has been much debate as to what the scope of the category should be, largely arising from debates over what the term "indigenous" should best encompass. For instance, the Japanese religion of Shinto is often referred to as an "indigenous religion" although, because the Japanese were not colonised but have colonised neighbouring societies like that of the Ainu, there is debate as to whether they meet the definition of "indigenous". In some cases, practitioners of new religions like Heathenry have sought to present theirs as "indigenous religions" although have faced scepticism from some scholars of religion.

== Definition ==
The academic study of religions has used three concepts through which to categorise different religious groups: "world religions", "new religious movements", and "indigenous religions". The scholar of religion Carole M. Cusack noted that "indigenous religions" were rejected from the "world religions" category because they "are typically this-wordly, orally transmitted, non-proselytizing, folk-oriented, expressed in myths and traditional law, and pluralist."

In the nineteenth century, the dominant ways to refer to these religions were "primitive religion" or "non-literate religion", as they were seen as offering insight into how religion was practiced by the earliest humans. Another term, "primal religion", was coined by Andrew Walls in the University of Aberdeen in the 1970s to provide a focus on non-Western forms of religion as found in Africa, Asia, and Oceania. However, according to the scholar of religion Graham Harvey, such approaches prefer Western industrialized people and the course of Protestant Enlightenment culture. Likewise, James Cox, Walls's student, argues that terms such as "primal religion", "primitive religion", and "tribal religion" suggest an undeveloped religion which can be seen as a preparation for conversion to Christianity.

Graham Harvey states that indigenous religions constitute most of the world's religions. At the same time, he noted that "indigenous religionists" do not numerically make up the majority of religious people.

Some religions considered "indigenous religions" have gained as much global visibility as some of the "world religions". For instance, musicians influenced by the belief systems of the Maori, Indigenous Australian, and Canadian First Nations peoples have had their work exposed to an international audience.

== Contested areas ==
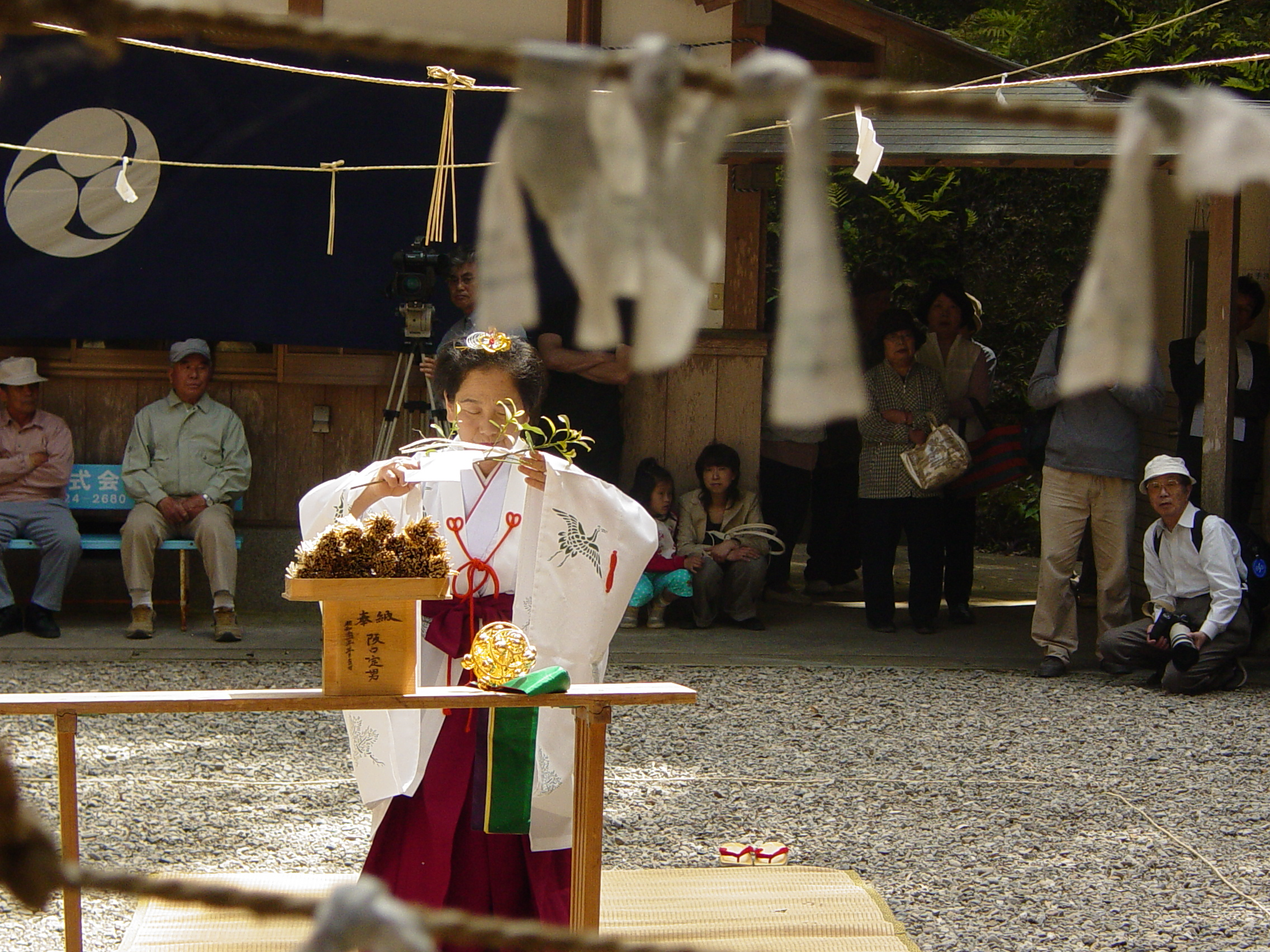
A Shinto rite; Shinto is often called an "indigenous religion", though the reasons for this classification have been debated among scholars.

The Japanese religion Shinto is often described as an "indigenous religion", although some scholars, like Asian studies scholar John K. Nelson, note that it is often "unclear" what is meant by the term "indigenous" in this context. He noted, for example, that there remain debates as to when the ancestors of the Japanese arrived in the islands that now make up Japan and that there were other communities, such as the Ainu, who lived on some of these islands before them. It is however, a native religion, being the religion of the ethnicity that arrived in the islands that now make up Japan.

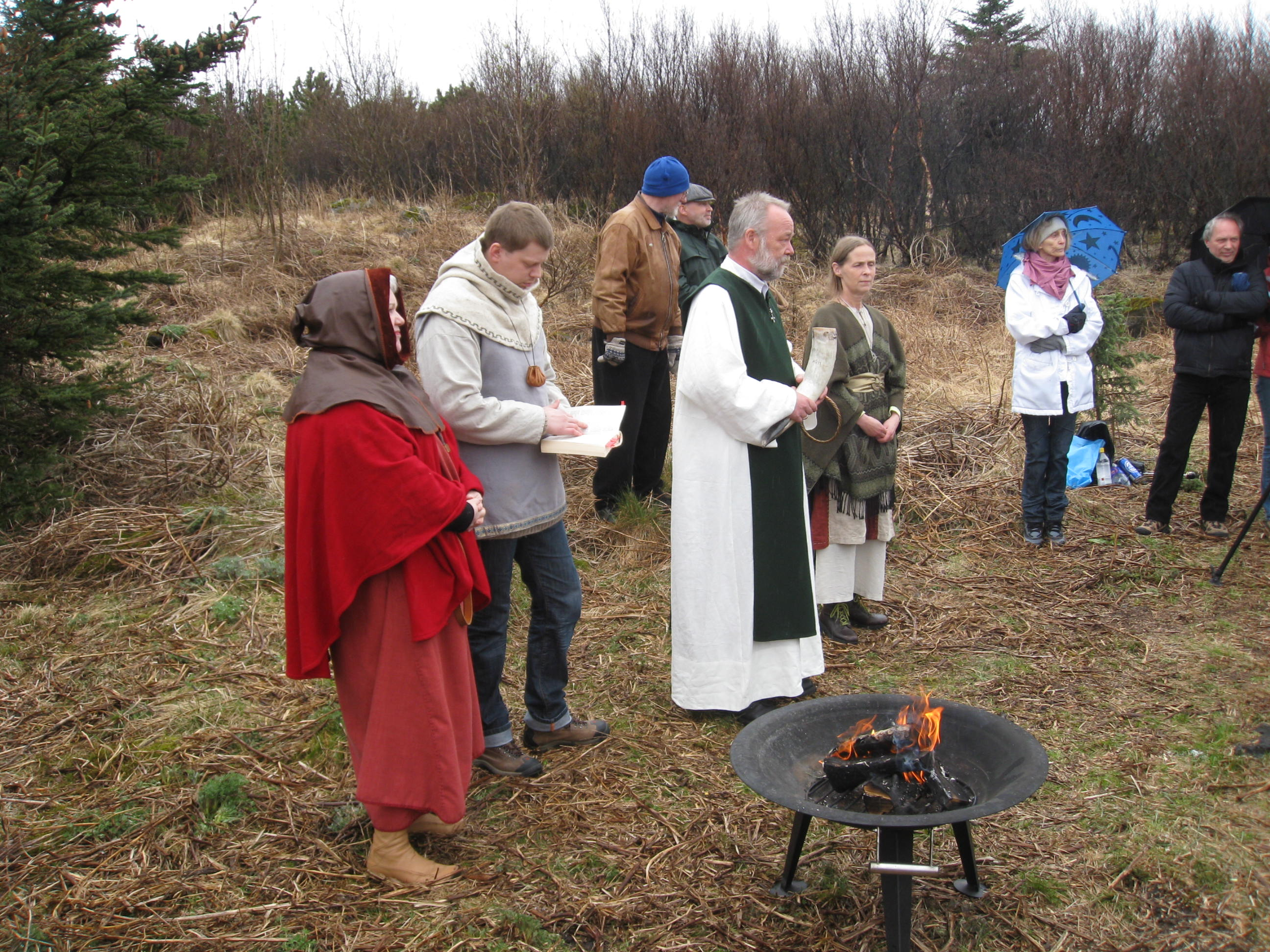
A 2009 rite performed on the Icelandic hill of Öskjuhlíð, Reykjavík

Many followers of Heathenry, a modern Pagan religion that scholars recognise as a new religious movement, like to regard their belief system as an "indigenous religion". In claiming a sense of indigeneity, some Heathens—particularly in the United States—attempt to frame themselves as the successors to the pre-Christian belief systems of linguistic Germanic communities in Northern Europe and thus victims of Medieval Christian colonialism and imperialism. The scholars Jennifer Snook, Thad Horrell, and Kirsten Horton argued that in doing so, these Heathens ignore the fact that most of them are considered "white", and have thus perpetrated and benefited from colonial and imperial policies against indigenous communities in the Americas and elsewhere.

== See also ==
- Ethnic religion
- Ethnoreligious group
- List of religions
  - List of ethnic religions

== Sources ==
=== Bibliography ===
- Cusack, Carole M. (2016). "Archaeology and the World Religions Paradigm: The European Neolithic, Religion and Cultural Imperialism". In Christopher R. Cotter; David G. Robertson (eds.). After World Religions: Reconstructing Religious Studies. London and New York: Routledge. pp. 153–67. ISBN 978-1-138-91912-9.
- Cox, James L.; Sutcliffe, Steven J. (2006). "Religious studies in Scotland: A persistent tension with divinity". Religion. 36 (1): 1–28. doi:10.1016/j.religion.2005.12.001.
- Cox, James L. (2007). From Primitive to Indigenous: The Academic Study of Indigenous Religions. Aldershot: Ashgate. ISBN 978-0-754-65569-5.
- Gregorius, Fredrik (2015). "Modern Heathenism in Sweden: A Case Study in the Creation of a Traditional Religion". In Rountree, Kathryn (ed.). Contemporary Pagan and Native Faith Movements in Europe: Colonialist and Nationalist Impulses. New York and Oxford: Berghahn. pp. 64–85. ISBN 978-1-78238-646-9.
- Harvey, Graham (2000). "Introduction". In Graham Harvey (ed.). Indigenous Religions: A Companion. London and New York: Cassell. pp. 1–19. ISBN 978-0304704484.
- Nelson, John K. (1996). A Year in the Life of a Shinto Shrine. Seattle and London: University of Washington Press. ISBN 978-0295975009.
- Snook, Jennifer (2015). American Heathens: The Politics of Identity in a Pagan Religious Movement. Philadelphia: Temple University Press. ISBN 978-1-4399-1097-9.
- Snook, Jennifer; Horrell, Thad; Horton, Kristen (2017). "Heathens in the United States: The Return to "Tribes" in the Construction of a Peoplehood". In Rountree, Kathryn (ed.). Cosmopolitanism, Nationalism, and Modern Paganism. New York: Palgrave Macmillan. pp. 43–64. ISBN 978-1-137-57040-6.
- Stausberg, Michael (March 2021). "The Demise, Dissolution, and Elimination of Religions". Numen. 68 (2–3 - Special Issue: The Dissolution of Religions). Leiden and Boston: Brill Publishers: 103–131. doi:10.1163/15685276-12341617. hdl:11250/2977936. ISSN 1568-5276. LCCN 58046229.
