= The Pomegranate =

Peer-reviewed academic journal

- Discipline: Pagan studies, religious studies
- Language: English
- Edited by: Chas S. Clifton

Publication details
- History: 1996–present
- Publisher: Equinox Publishing
- Frequency: Biannually

Standard abbreviations
- ISO 4: Pomegranate

Indexing
- ISSN: 1528-0268 (print); 1743-1735 (web)
- LCCN: 00211062
- OCLC no.: 43190189

Links
- Journal homepage; Online archive

The Pomegranate: The International Journal of Pagan Studies is a peer-reviewed academic journal covering the field of Pagan studies including historical, sociological, and anthropological studies dealing with contemporary Paganism and other forms of pagan religion. Since 2004 the journal has been published by Equinox Publishing and the editor-in-chief is Chas S. Clifton (Colorado State University–Pueblo).

The journal was established as a scholarly but not fully peer-reviewed publication in 1996 by Fritz Muntean and Diana Tracy with the subtitle A New Journal of Neopagan Thought. In 2001 the production of the journal was put on hiatus, as Muntean stepped down as editor, to be replaced by Clifton when it resumed publication, this time as a fully peer-reviewed academic publication and with its current subtitle.

== History ==
The front cover to The Pomegranate: A New Journal of Neopagan Studies (issue 17 portrayed).

The idea for The Pomegranate was initially developed by Fritz Muntean, a graduate student in religious studies at the University of British Columbia in Canada, who started the venture with his friend Diana Tracy, who was then living in Oregon in the United States. Initially naming their work The Pomegranate: A New Journal of Neopagan Thought, the stated intention of the publication was to "provide a scholarly venue for the forthright and critical examination of Neopagan beliefs and practices". From 1996 to 2001, Muntean published 18 issues of The Pomegranate on a quarterly basis, gaining a growing readership as time went on, particularly after Muntean and Tracy introduced the journal to the assembled members at the third Nature Religions Scholars Network (NRSN), a group which met in conjunction with the annual San Francisco meeting of the American Academy of Religion.

Muntean eventually decided to move on from his work as editor of The Pomegranate, leaving that position to be occupied by Clifton. Together, Muntean and Clifton searched for a new publisher, in 2003 eventually signing an agreement with Equinox Publishing. Under Clifton's control, the journal's subtitle was changed to The International Journal of Pagan Studies and it adopted a peer review structure for the papers which it published.

== Abstracting and indexing ==
The journal is abstracted and indexed in Religious and Theological Abstracts, Arts & Humanities Citation Index, Current Contents/Arts & Humanities, and Academic Search Premier and other EBSCO databases.

== See also ==
- Aries: Journal for the Study of Western Esotericism
- Magic, Ritual, and Witchcraft
- Nova Religio: The Journal of Alternative and Emergent Religions
