= Michael York (religious studies scholar) =

American academic

Michael York is an American religious studies scholar, based in the United Kingdom, who specializes in the study of pre-Christian European religion and its relation to contemporary Paganism. In 2003, he published Pagan Theology, in which he put forward the idea that the ancient pre-Christian and pre-Islamic religions of Eurasia, indigenous religions from across the globe, and contemporary Pagan faiths could all be constituted as forms of paganism. Michael York participated in TEDxLambeth 2019 as a speaker.

== Personal life ==
Describing his own religious beliefs and his affection for paganism, York remarked that:

If I had to name my own denominational predilection, I would say that I am a "religionist." I believe in religion itself and its central role in expanding human consciousness above and beyond immediate daily concerns. I see religion as an ongoing dialogue that questions the purpose of life and our terrestrial incarnations. In my own pursuit and love of religion as religion, I have been particularly attracted to paganism not only as the source and origin of all religion but also as an organic alternative to the institutionalized and parochial insularity that much religious expression has become.

== Bibliography ==
=== Books ===
Title	Year	Publisher	ISBN
The Roman Festival Calendar of Numa Pompilius	1986	Peter Lang (New York)	
The Emerging Network: A Sociology of the New Age and Neo‑pagan Movements	1995	Rowman & Littlefield (Lanham, Maryland)	
The Divine versus the Asurian: An Interpretation of Indo-European Cult and Myth	1995	Rowman & Littlefield (Lanham, Maryland)	
Pagan Theology: Paganism as a World Religion	2003	New York University Press (New York)	
Historical Dictionary of New Age Movements	2004	Scarecrow Press (Lanham, Maryland)	
The A to Z of New Age Movements	2009	Scarecrow Press (Lanham, Maryland)	
Pagan Ethics: Paganism as a World Religion	2016	Springer (New York)	
Pagan Mysticism: Paganism as a World Religion	2019	Cambridge Scholars Publishing (Newcastle upon Tyne)	
Matter Matters: End of Life Perspectives on Paganism	2023	Svarga (London)	
